= Caterham School =

Private school in Caterham, Surrey, England

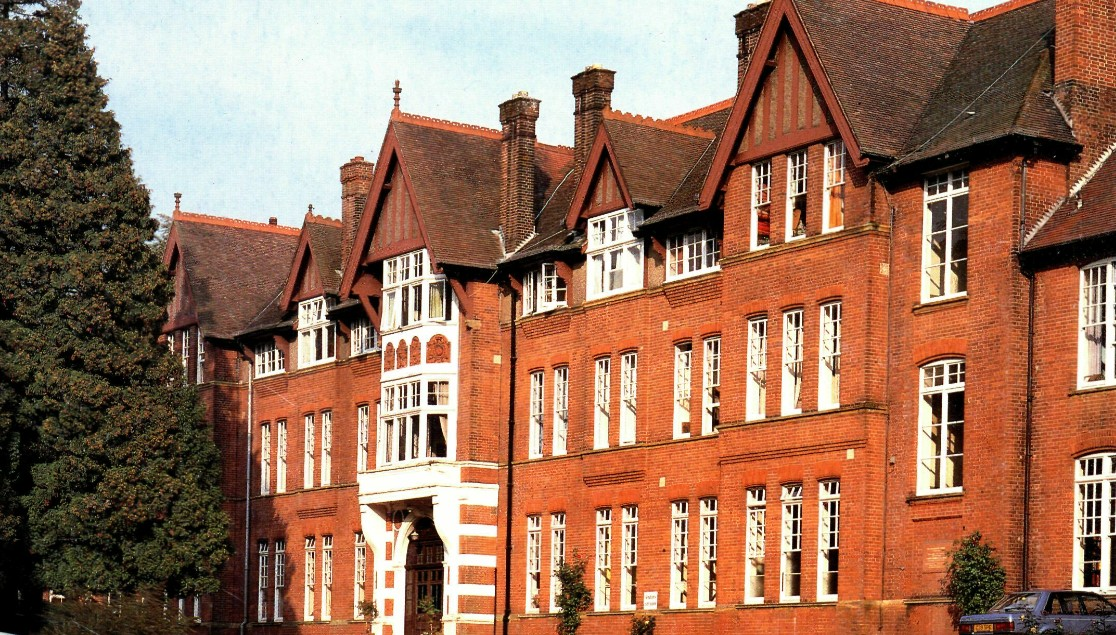
- The Old School at Caterham

Location
- Harestone Valley Road; Caterham, Surrey, CR3 6YA; England; 51.2726°N 0.086651°W

Information
- Former name: The Congregational School
- Type: Co-educational public (fee-charging HMC) day and boarding school
- Motto: Latin: veritas sine timore (Truth without Fear)
- Religious affiliation: Protestant (United Reformed Church)
- Established: 1811; 215 years ago
- Founder: John Townsend; Catherine and Winifred Pye (Eothen)
- Department for Education URN: 125427 Tables
- President: Hon. Mr Justice Graeme Mew
- Chair of Trustees: Monisha Shah
- Headmaster: Ceri Jones; Ben Purkiss (Caterham Prep)
- Staff: ~200
- Gender: Co-educational (3-18)
- Age: 3 to 18
- Enrolment: ~1100
- Campus: 200-acre (0.8km^{2})
- Houses: 9 (3 boarding)
- Colours: Black & Yellow
- Publication: 'The Caterhamian' 'Omnia' 'Cat Among the Pigeons' 'Quantum Ultimatum' 'Preview'
- Revenue: £48,807,000 (2025)
- Affiliation: HMC; Apple Distinguished Schools; Edtech 50; Copthorne Preparatory School; The Hawthorns School; Oakhyrst Grange School; London Academy of Excellence
- Alumni: Old Caterhamians
- Partnerships: Caterham Family of Schools; East Surrey Learning Partnership
- Website: Caterham School
- "Caterham School, registered charity no. 1109508". Charity Commission for England and Wales.

Caterham School is a co-educational day and boarding public school in Caterham, Surrey and is a member of the Headmasters' and Headmistresses' Conference.

Founded as 'The Congregational School' during the Regency era, a charitable institution to educate the sons of Congregationalist clergy, Caterham developed into providing a public school education which was made co-educational in 1995 by a merger with Eothen School. In September 2025, Caterham was shortlisted for the 2026 'Tatler Schools Guide', along with Eton, Canford, Brighton and Gresham's, for the title of the best public school in the country.

Caterham is recognised internationally for its approach to digital learning. It was among the first schools in the United Kingdom to introduce an iPad rollout in 2015 as an Apple Distinguished School and among the first in the world to develop its own subsidiary artificial intelligence company. It has been recognised by the Westminster Education Foundation think tank as a member of the EdTech 50 since 2019.

The school has also opened up a number of partnership programmes for collaboration across private and state education, such as the East Surrey Learning Partnership and the Caterham Family of Schools.

== Campus ==
Caterham's campus is on the edge of its estate which extends to around 200 acres (81 hectares). It is set within Harestone Valley, and a large part of the estate consists of Oldpark Wood. The school owns the large 'Hare stone' that named the valley, which was first recorded in 1605 but is believed to be older.

Notable people who formally opened or laid foundation stones for buildings at Caterham include HRH Prince Edward, Duke of Kent, Lord Carey of Clifton (the 103rd Archbishop of Canterbury), Samuel Morley and William Hulme Lever, 2nd Viscount Leverhulme.

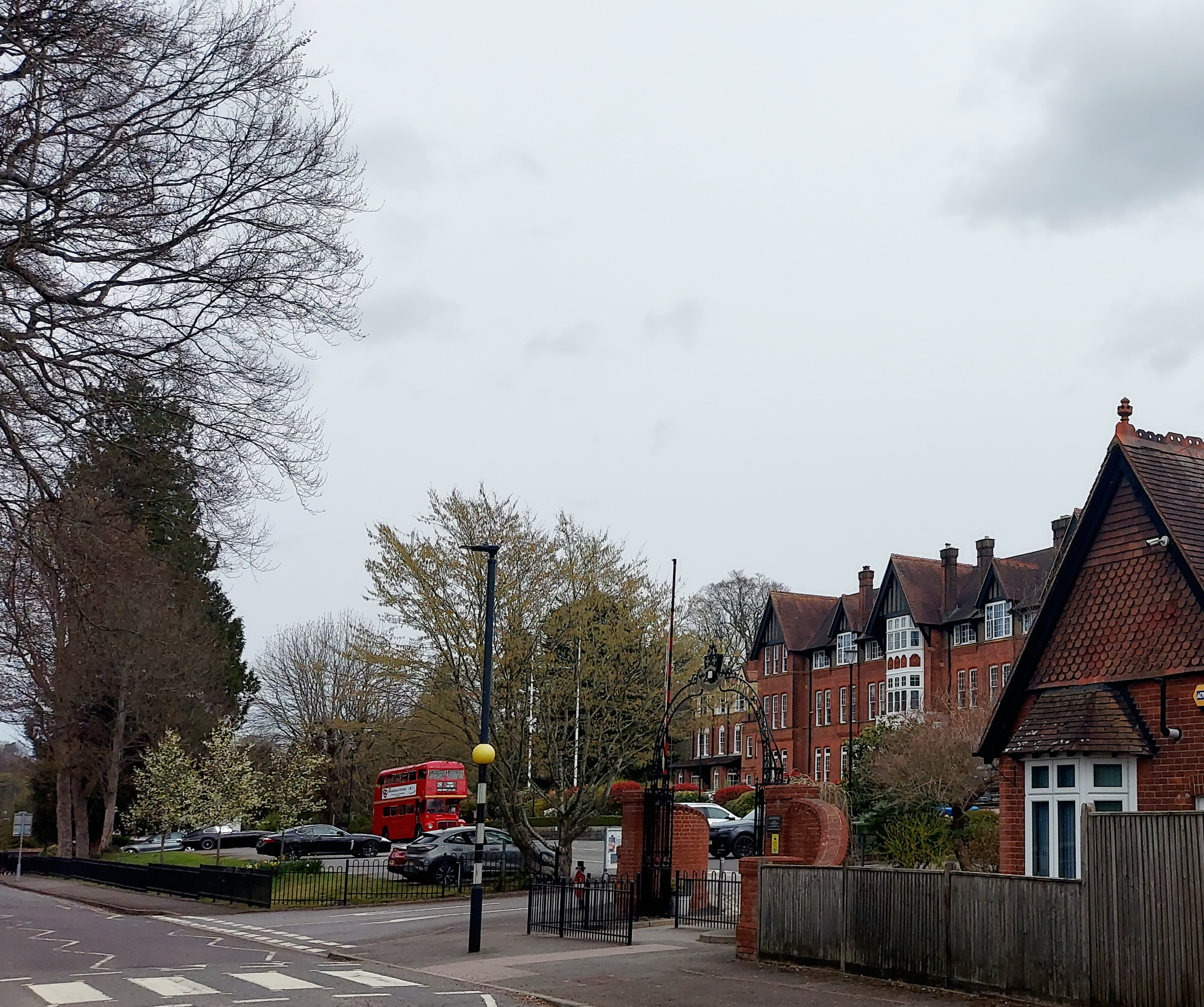
The Old School from Harestone Valley Road, behind School Lodge.

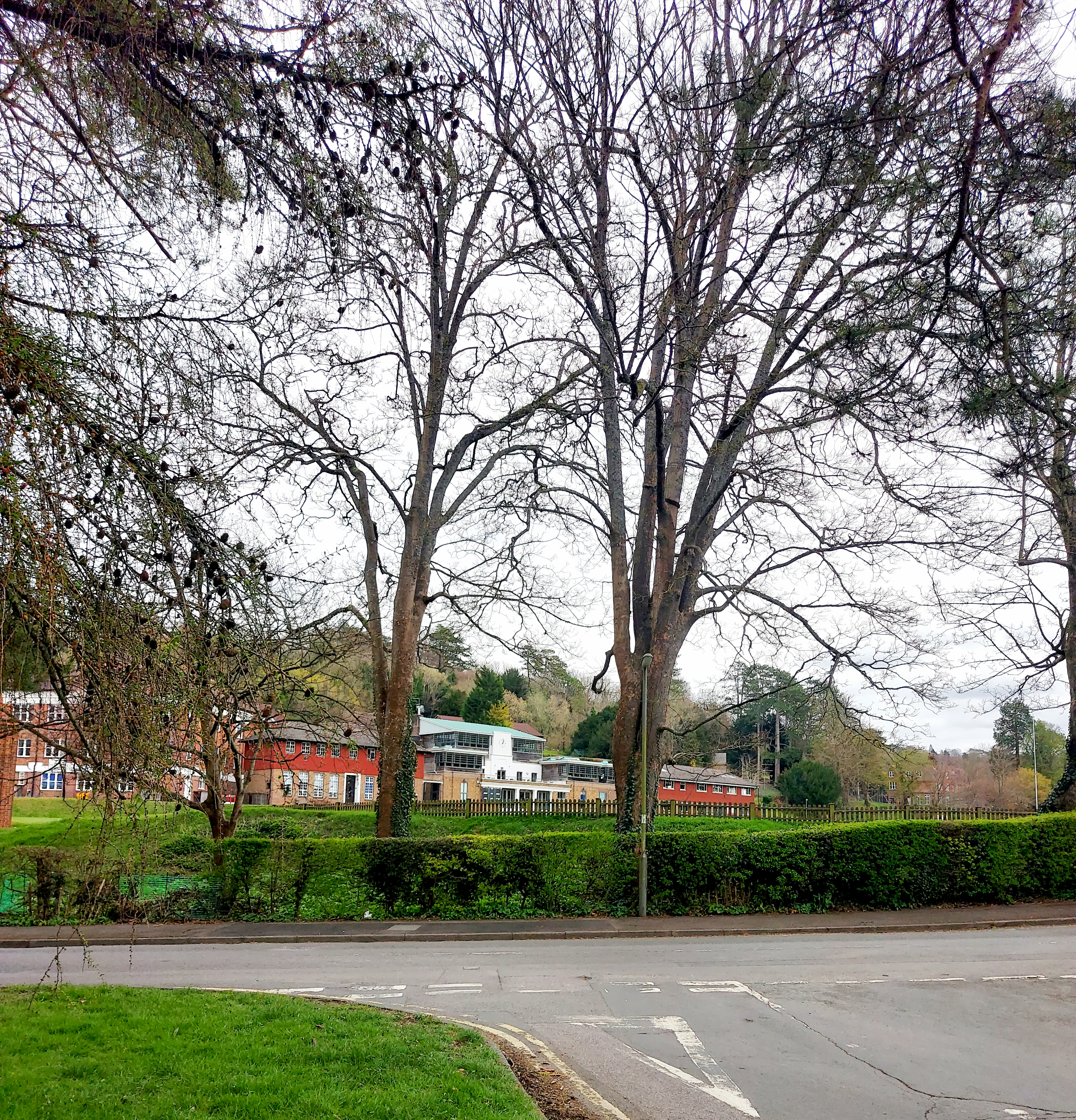
The Leathem Building, from Harestone Valley Road

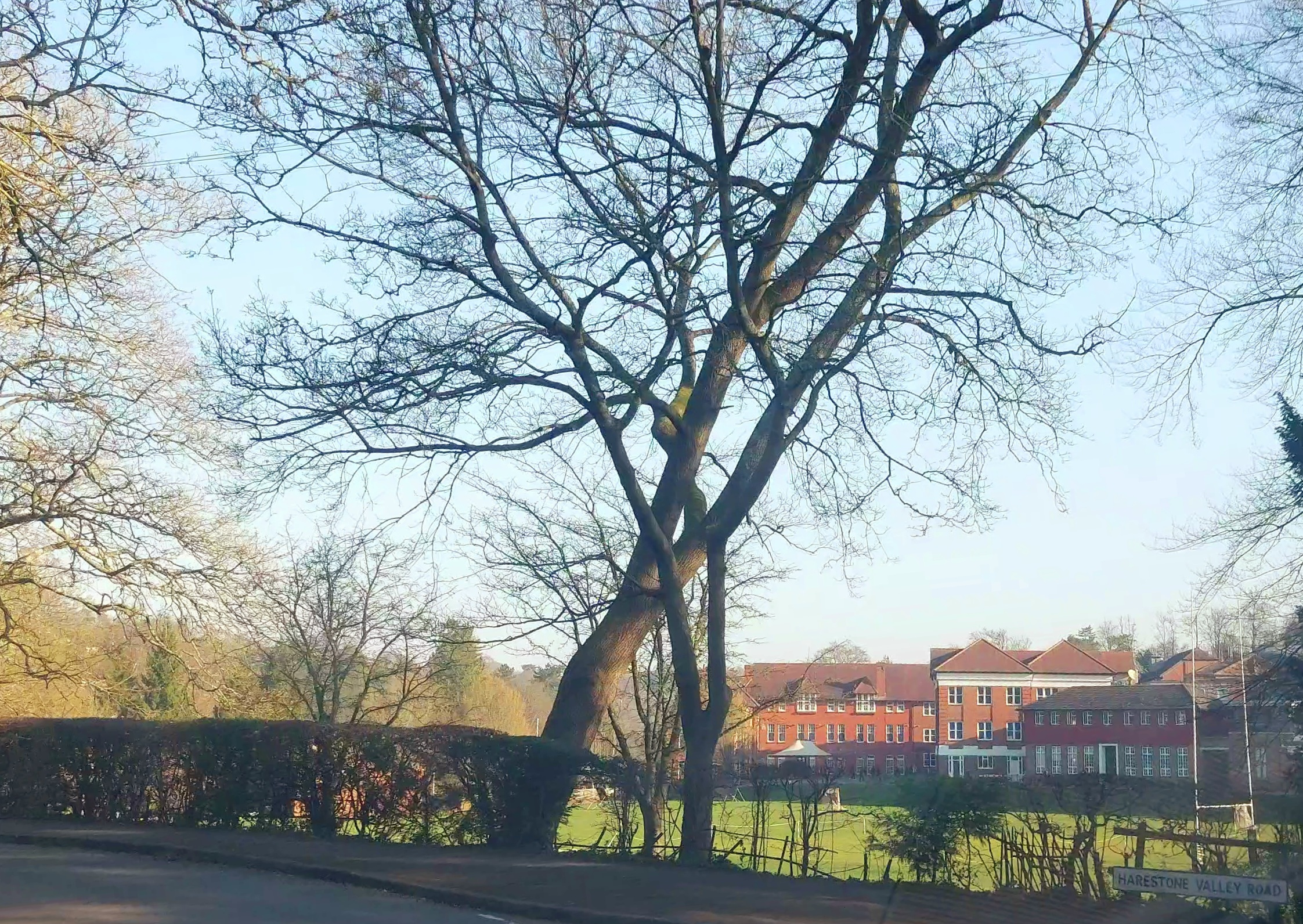
The Old School over Home Field, from Harestone Valley Road

=== Old School ===
At the front of Caterham is the Old School, designed by E.C. Robins and finished in 1884. Its foundation stone was laid in 1883 by Samuel Morley. In 2011 the Old School was housing Caterham's administration, the Wilberforce Hall and the Townsend and Viney boarding houses.

The Old School has two facades. The Main Front faces Harestone Valley Road (the section of which was a tree-lined avenue) and the Main Court is the space in between them. Originally the Main Court was an open lawn but was later replaced with roads to ease the traffic in and out of the valley. The Home Front of the Old School faces Home Field.

The Main Court is the venue of Caterham's annual classic car show.

The Old School was painted by the Second World War artist Dennis Flanders in 1991 and is among his last works.

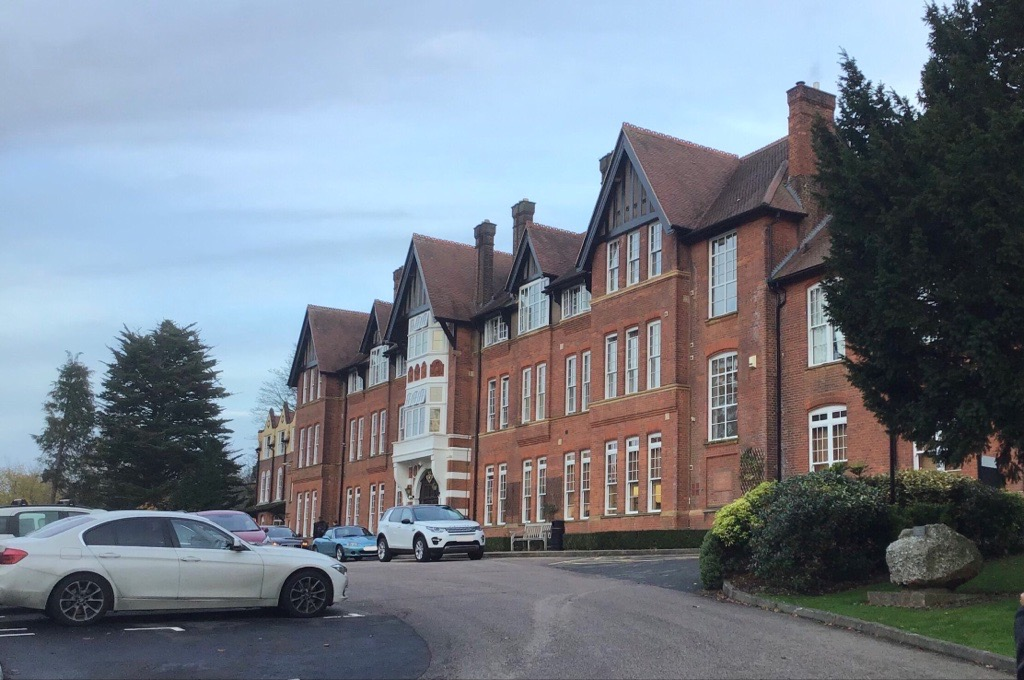
The Old School, seen from what was the original approach through the Lodge with the ancient Harestone to the right. 'Harestone' is a school house at Caterham.

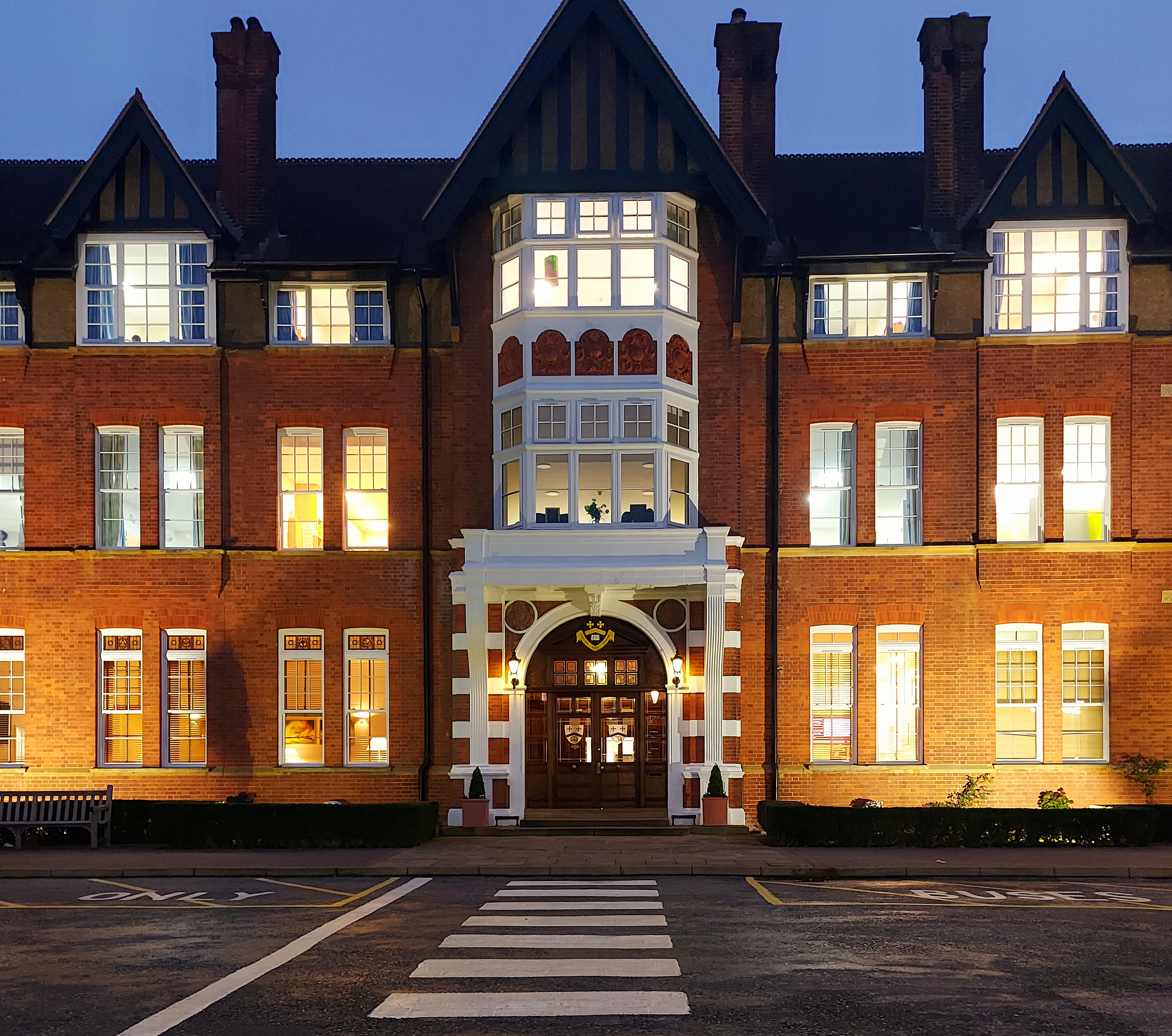
The middle section of the Old School's façade.

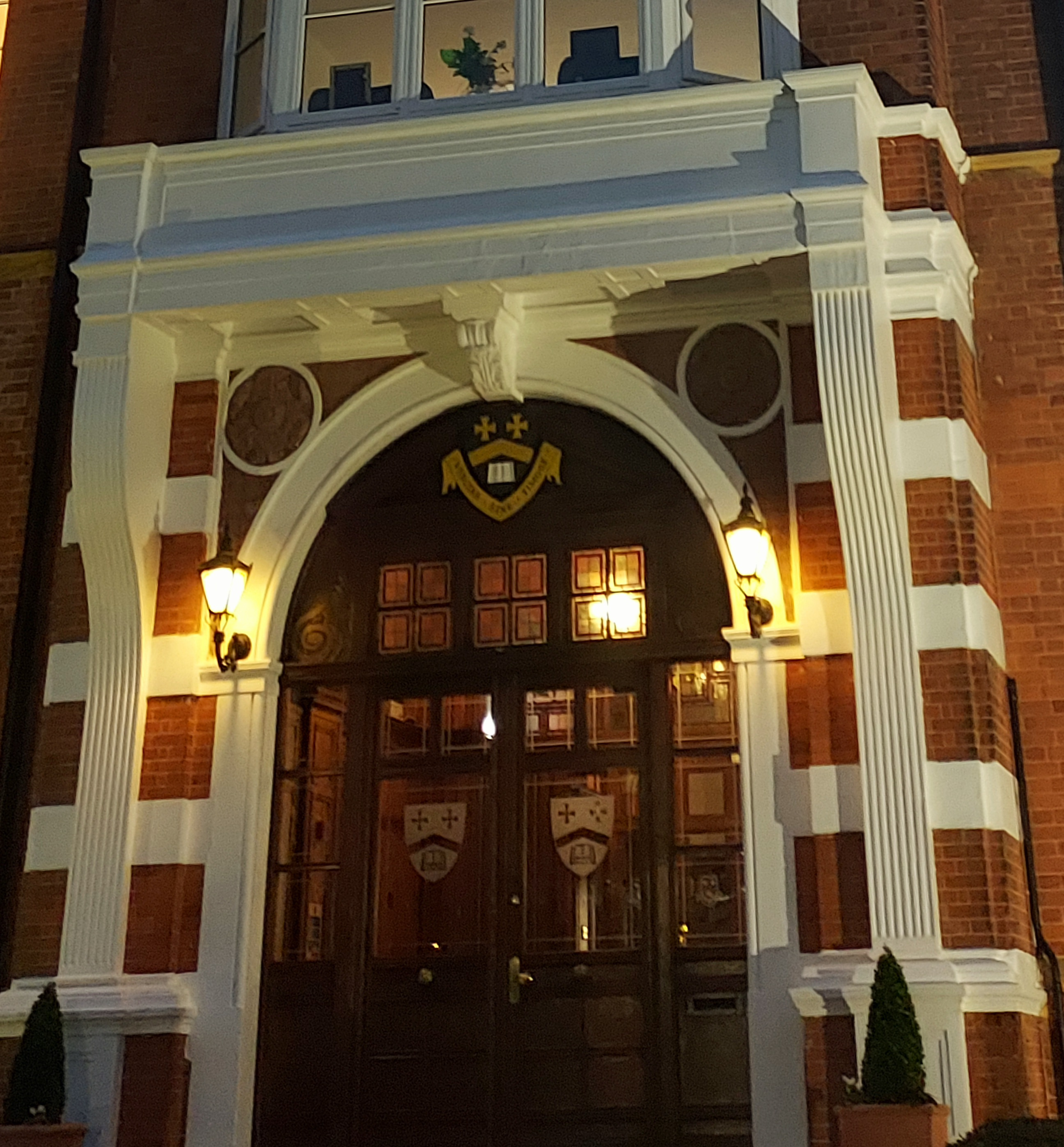
The porch and front door of the Old School, designed by E. C. Robins. Only the three panes below the emblem remain from the original 19th-century glass screen.

==== Vestibule and Concourse ====
The vestibule at Caterham is the formal entrance which houses Sir William Reynolds-Stephens' memorial for the Old Caterhamians who died in the First World War. The vestibule joins to a long corridor that spans the horizontal axis of the Old School, which in the 19th century was the thoroughfare of Caterham. The vestibule leads to the Concourse.

The concourse is built within the inside court of the Old School and connects it with the Pye Centre.

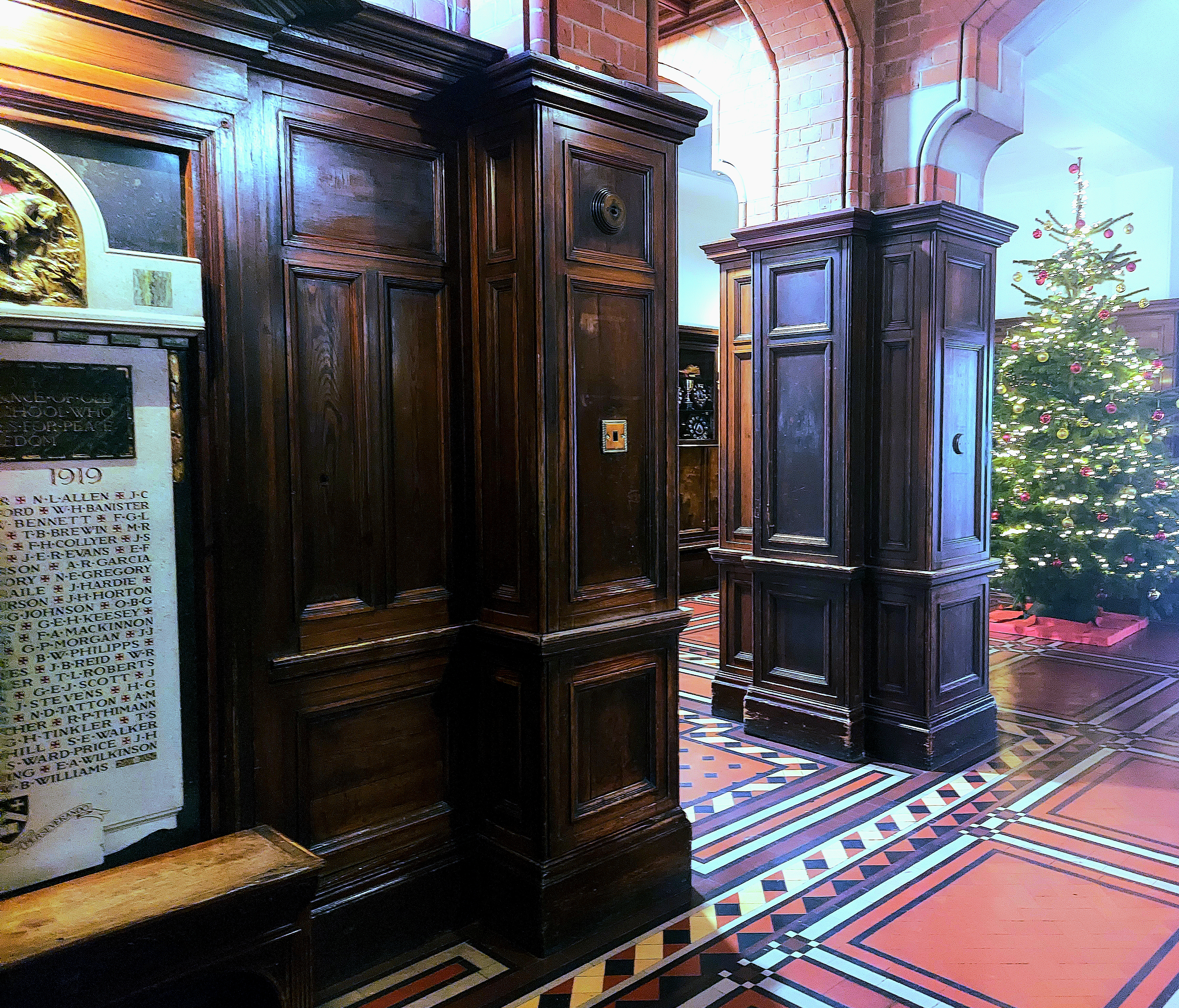
View from the vestibule through the cloister of the Old School at Christmas.

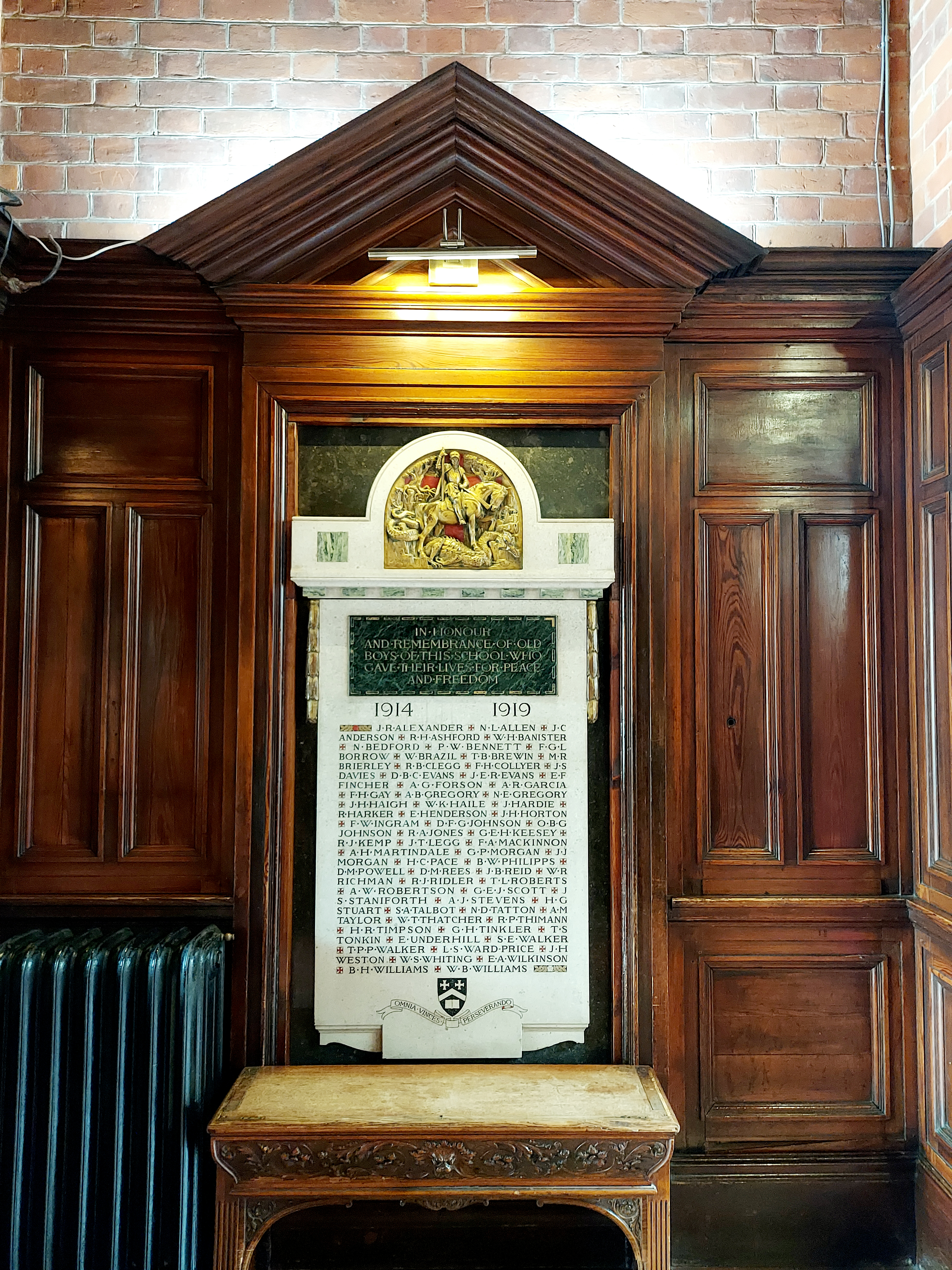
The WW1 Memorial at Caterham.

==== Wilberforce Hall ====
Located off the cloisters is the Wilberforce Hall - Caterham's former formal dining hall - now named after the abolitionist William Wilberforce who was a founding governor of Caterham in 1811. The Wilberforce is notable for its illumination by seven Arts-and-Crafts stained glass windows between both sides and red-white polychrome brickwork. It is now a space for lectures, concerts (choirs, piano recitals or small instrumental groups), fashion shows, museum exhibitions and formal luncheons, teas or dinners. The hall has, however, been used for exhibitions for over a century: the 1924 Science Exhibition there featured an aquarium and a display of motor-car engines. The pianist Lance Dossor gave a number of piano recitals at the Hall during the 1930s, before gaining a prize at the III International Chopin Piano Competition.

In November 2011, the Wilberforce Hall housed an important exhibition and auction fundraising for the school's charity programmes which featured commissioned miniature pieces "no larger than a postcard" from a number of notable artists and designers such as the architect Lord Norman Foster, the sculptor David Nash, the abstract artist Anthony Frost as well as artist and comedian Jim Moir.

The Wilberforce Hall houses Caterham's large bicentenary banner which was attached at Westminster Abbey during its bicentenary service in October 2011.

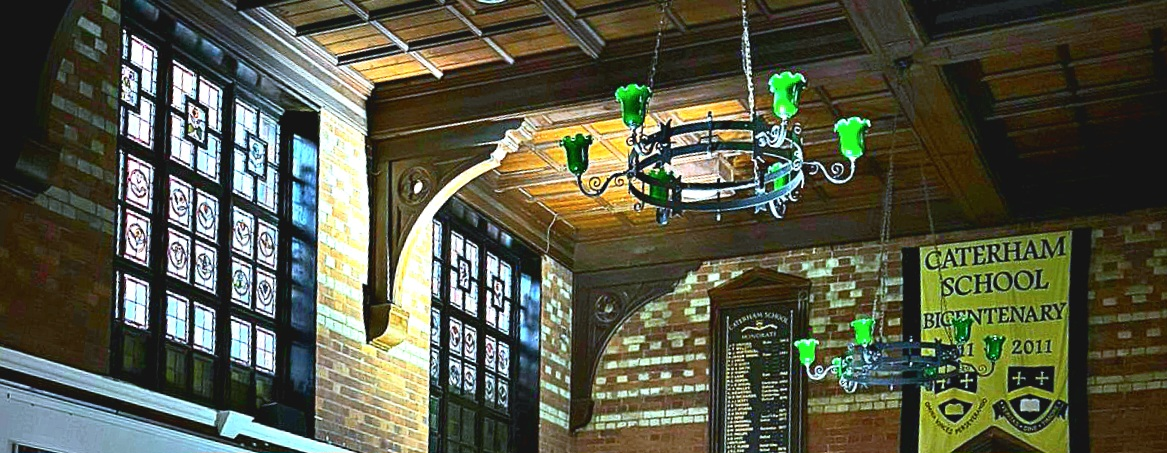
Two of the stained glass windows at one end of the Wilberforce Hall, with the bicentenary banner to the right.

==== Headmaster's House and Garden ====
Adjoining the Old School is Headmaster's House which was, traditionally, the residence of the Headmaster of Caterham. In the 1940s it was the home of the historian D.G.E. Hall. To the front of it is the Headmaster's Garden, which is Caterham's formal garden but is now much reduced. Traditionally, the garden was both a personal space for the Headmaster and a venue for formal occasions (such as the reception of the Deputy Prime Minister, Sir Geoffrey Howe in 1982). For a time this featured a parterre of Caterham's emblem. It remains to this day that pupils are not permitted to stand on or walk across the lawn of the Headmaster's Garden without permission and should dismount if cycling past.

The Headmaster's Garden

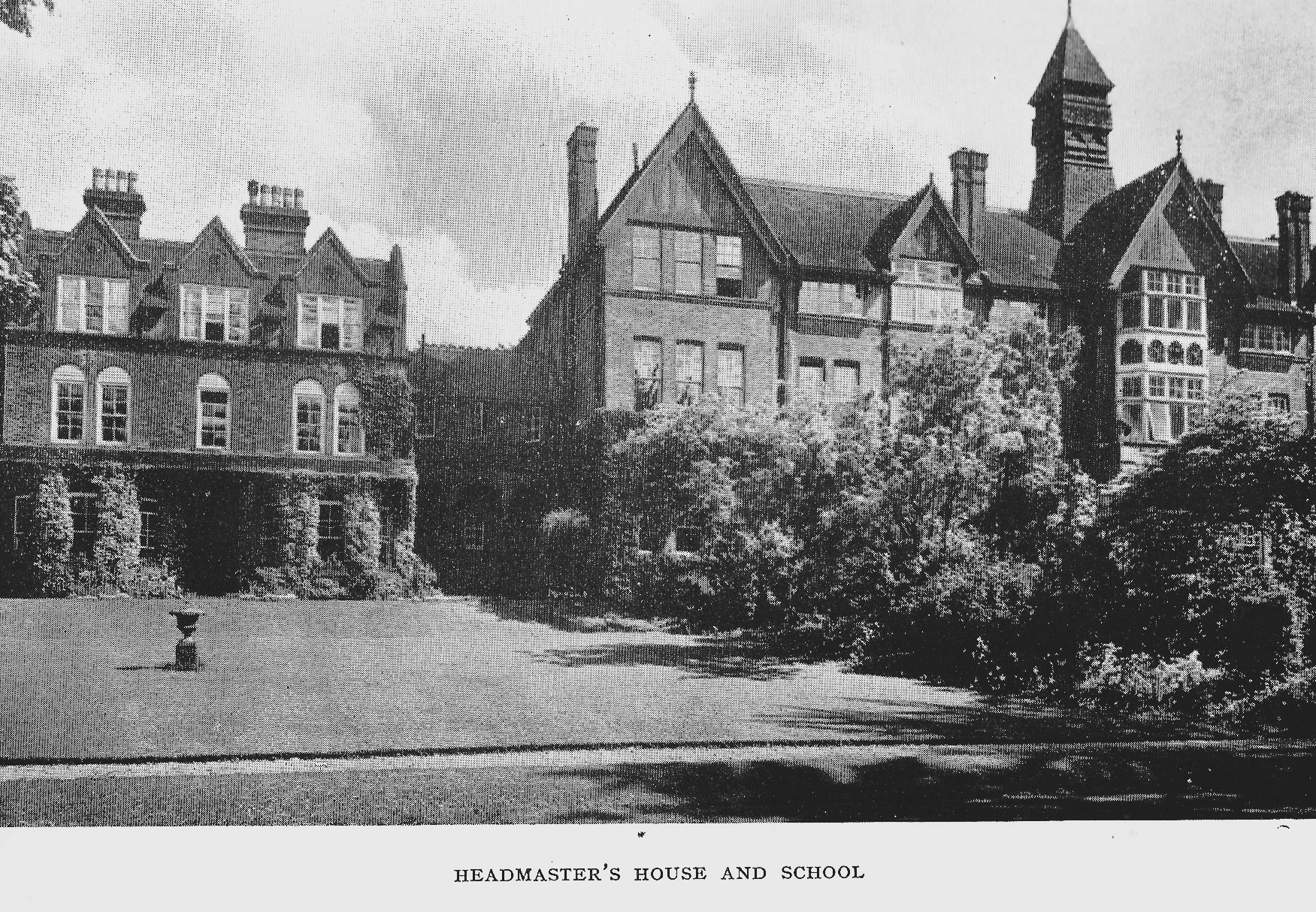
The herbaceous border in the Headmaster's Garden, when D.G.E. Hall lived in the house in the 1940s.

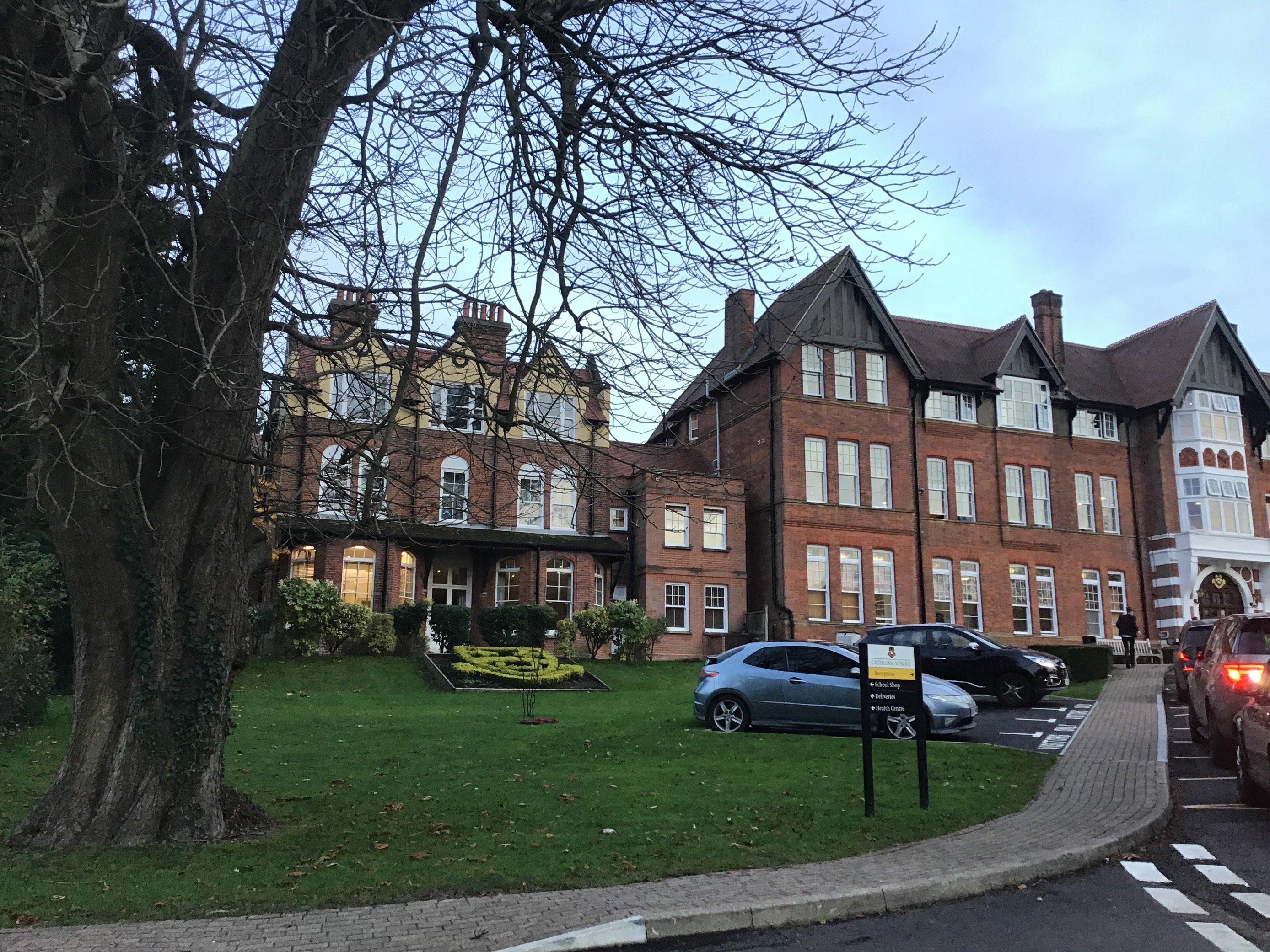
The Headmaster's Garden in 2020, with the Caterham parterre.

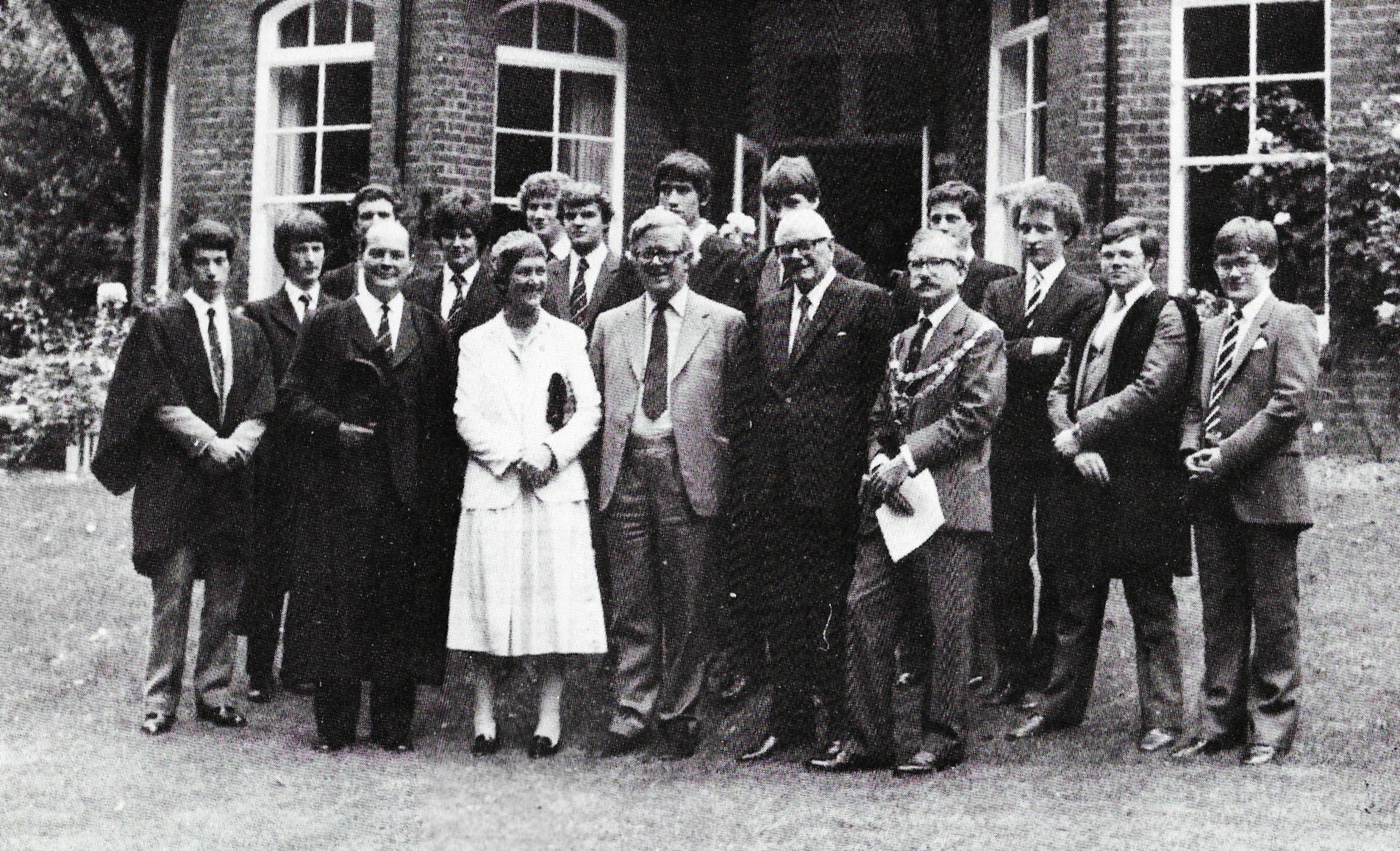
Sir Geoffrey Howe (then Deputy Prime Minister under Margaret Thatcher) and Lady Elspeth Howe in the Headmaster's Garden with headmaster Stephen Smith, the Head Boy (gowned) and Sixth Form Prefects on Speech Day at Caterham in 1982.

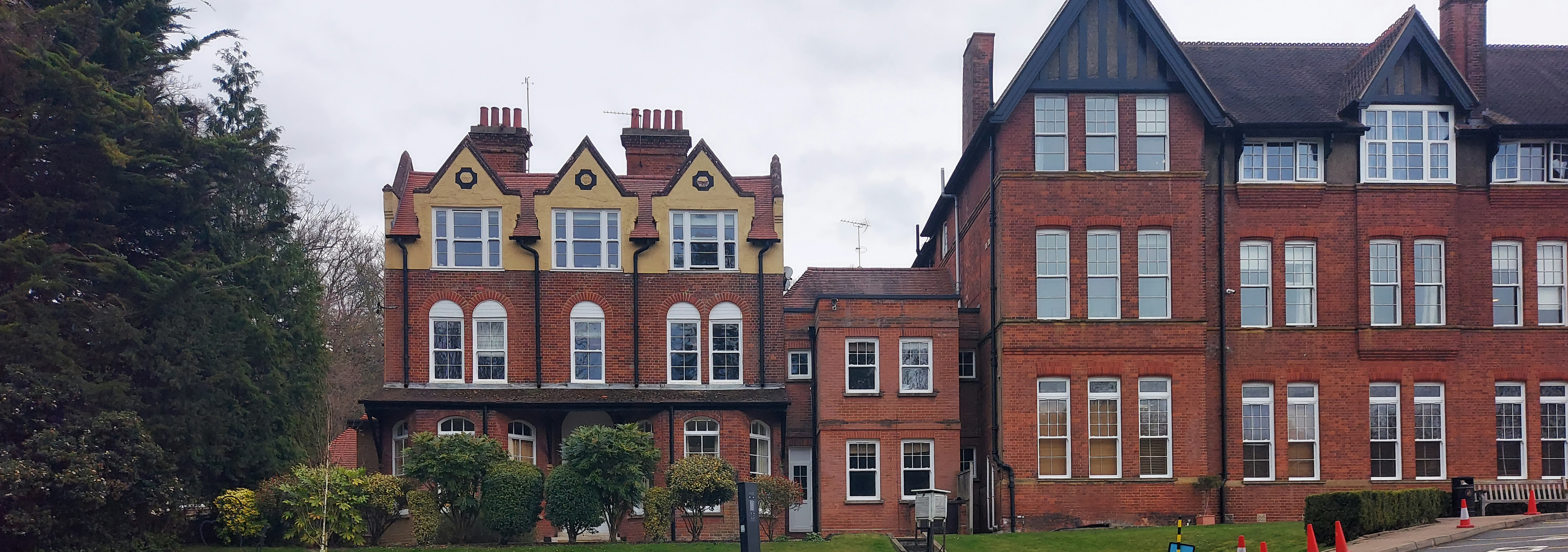
The (former) Headmaster's House adjoining the Old School at Caterham

=== Maggs Library ===
Caterham's main library is housed in its Memorial Hall at the centre of the campus, built in 1925 to commemorate the Old Caterhamians killed in the First World War. It was designed by the architect Walter Monckton Keesey OBE OC and opened in July 1925 by the Chair of Caterham, William Hulme Lever, 2nd Viscount Leverhulme DL.

During the mid-20th century, the Memorial Hall served as Caterham's concert hall. Notably, the pianist Peter Katin performed there in 1985 and 1987. For most of the 20th century, the building also housed the Caterham School Archive before its move to updated premises within the Pye Centre.

Albert P. Maggs OC of the London antiquarian booksellers Maggs Bros later contributed to the building's conversion into the Maggs Library. The Maggs Library has one large, long reading room housing non-fiction and another reading room and a gallery space housing fiction.

When Miller Bourne built the Performing Arts Centre in 2015, the space in front of the Memorial Hall was redeveloped into a small stone plaza with amphitheatre seating.

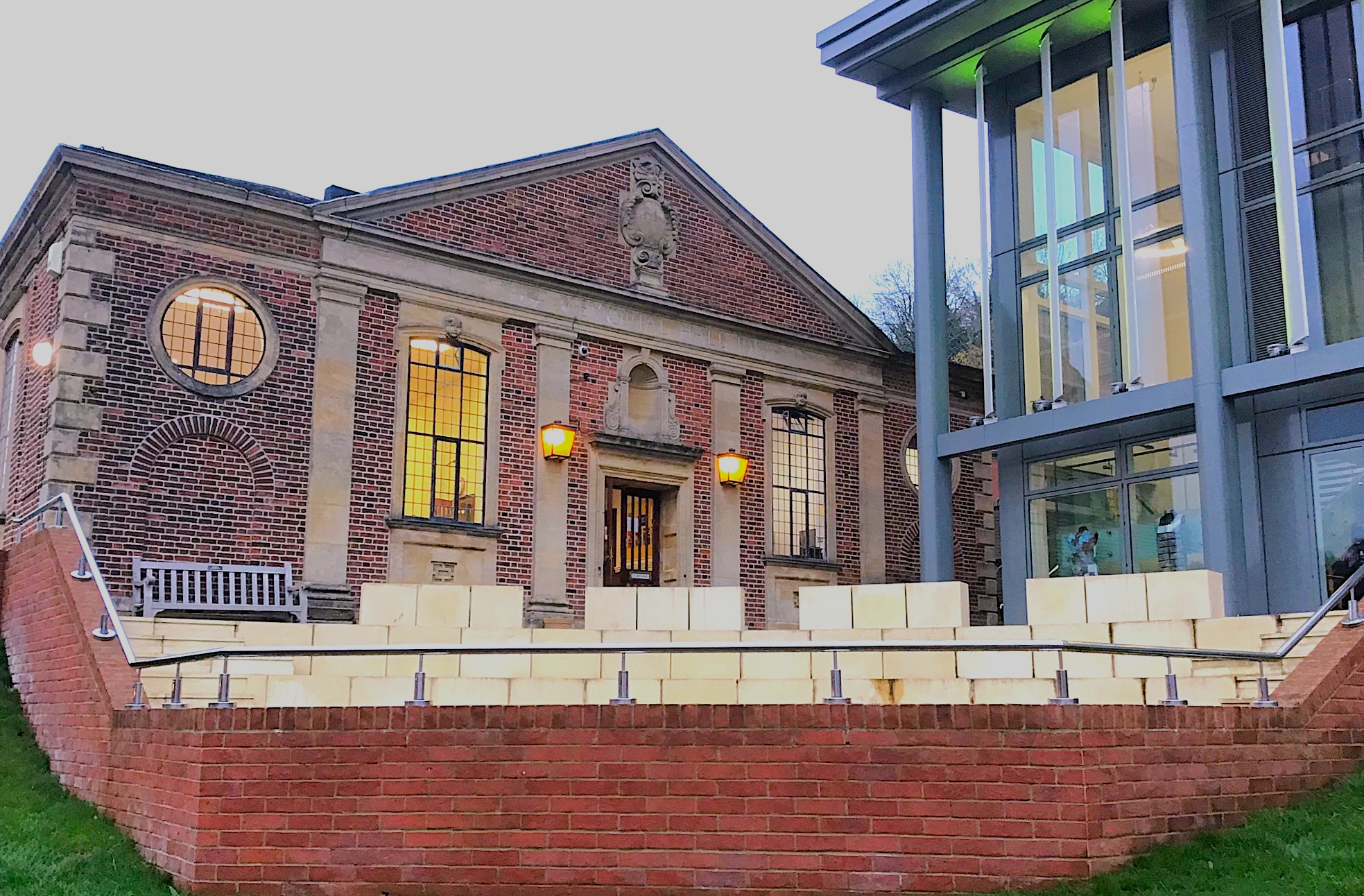
The Maggs Library from School Lane in 2021, with the Performing Arts Centre to the right and the amphitheatre plaza in front.

=== Performing Arts Centre ===
Caterham's performing arts centre was designed by Miller Bourne, finished in 2015 and opened by Simon Callow CBE.

The centre opens to the wider community on occasions, such as for the school's History Festival in November, visiting productions or for events for local primary schools. In 2021, Caterham hosted a TEDx event which took place in the Humphreys. Poet, broadcaster and former Children's Laureate Michael Rosen hosted an event at the centre for pupils from local primary schools in Caterham's East Surrey Learning Partnership on literacy skills.

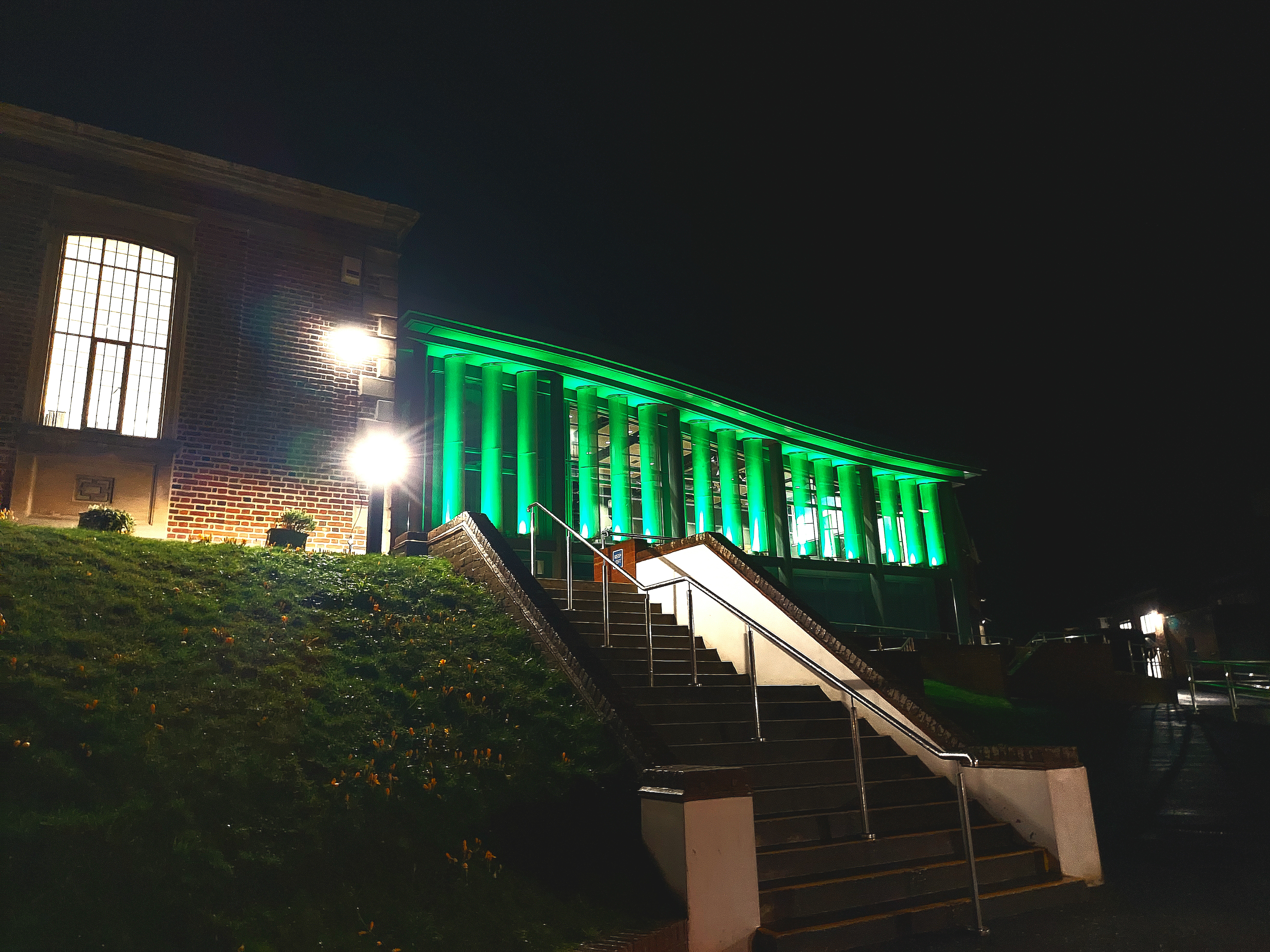
Performing Arts Centre illuminated green at night, from School Lane. The Maggs Library is to the left.

==== Studios ====
On the ground floor is a studio for dance and orchestral rehearsals, and on the first floor is the Liu Recording Studio.

==== Humphreys and Deayton Theatres ====
The first and second floors the Performing Arts Centre incorporate the older Humphreys Theatre of 338 seats. It also houses the Department of Drama and connects it with that of Music. The Humphreys now serves as the school's principal concert hall which can house its orchestra.

Both the Humphreys and Deayton theatres have retractable seating which enables black-box and theatre-in-the-round arrangements. In 2024, Caterham's production of a dramatisation of George Orwell's 'Nineteen Eighty-Four' made use of theatre-in-the-round in the Humphreys to reflect the telescreen surveillance.

==== Outside theatres ====
Outside, at the front of the centre is a small amphitheatre and to the side of it is the Orchard Theatre of 72 seats, located on the site of Caterham's orchard.

=== Davey Building ===
The Davey Building was opened in 2007 by Lord Carey of Clifton, the 103rd Archbishop of Canterbury and named to mark the end of Mr. Rob Davey's tenure as Headmaster. On the ground floor is the Refectory which replaced the school's Victorian dining hall (now the Wilberforce Hall). On the first floor is the Department of Physics, on the second is Chemistry and on the third is Biology. Each department has five laboratories.

=== Pye Centre ===
Named after the founding sisters of Eothen, which merged with Caterham in 1995, the Pye Centre was a redevelopment of the original North Wing of the Old School. It connects the Concourse and the Wilberforce Hall to its Sixth Form Centre which consists of a downstairs Common Room and upstairs Library.

It also houses Caterham's Health Centre surgery and Archives site. Prior to this, the archive was housed in a reading room on the first floor of the Maggs Library.

=== Rudd Hall, Leathem Complex and Home Field ===
Caterham's main sports field for cricket, rugby and lacrosse is Home Field which has been in use since the late-19th century. The Leathem Pavilion overlooks it on the bank, and was built as a second war memorial for Old Caterhamians who died in the Second World War after the Memorial Hall for the First World War.

The pavilion housing a bar and balcony terrace was redeveloped by Miller Bourne in 2012 to include a complex of modern classrooms and fine art and dance studios. The complex was opened by HRH Prince Edward, Duke of Kent in February 2012. The Leathem Complex also houses the Christine Walker Gallery, which is Caterham's permanent art gallery named after an artist who went to Eothen (which merged with Caterham in 1995).

Adjoining the Leathem Complex is the Rudd Hall, which was built in 1938 as a gymnasium and for some time was the school's second theatre, where Robert Easton performed in 1939. The stage is no longer in use, having been replaced by the modern Deayton Theatre in Caterham's Performing Arts Centre.

Home Field

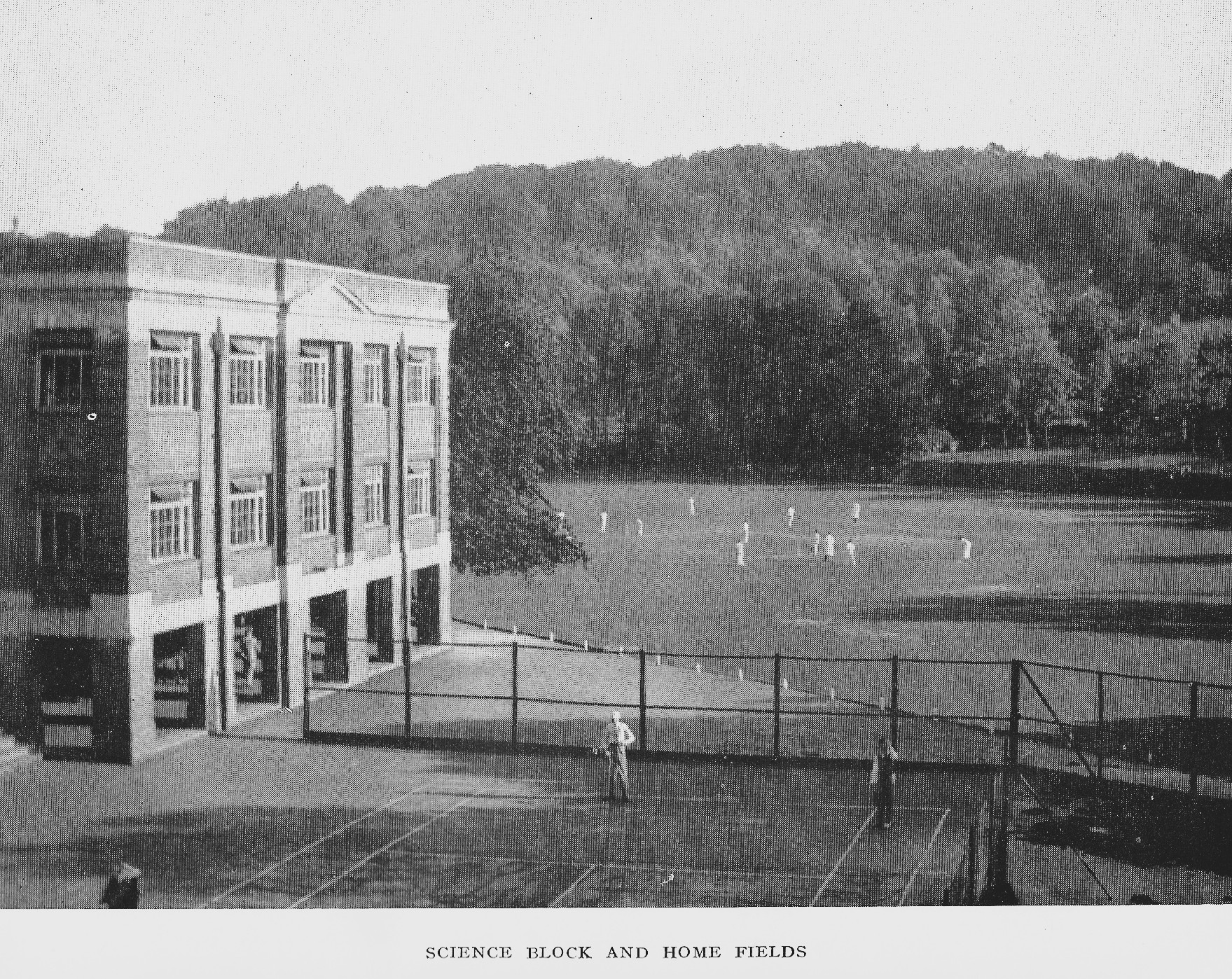
Cricket being played on Home in c.1945

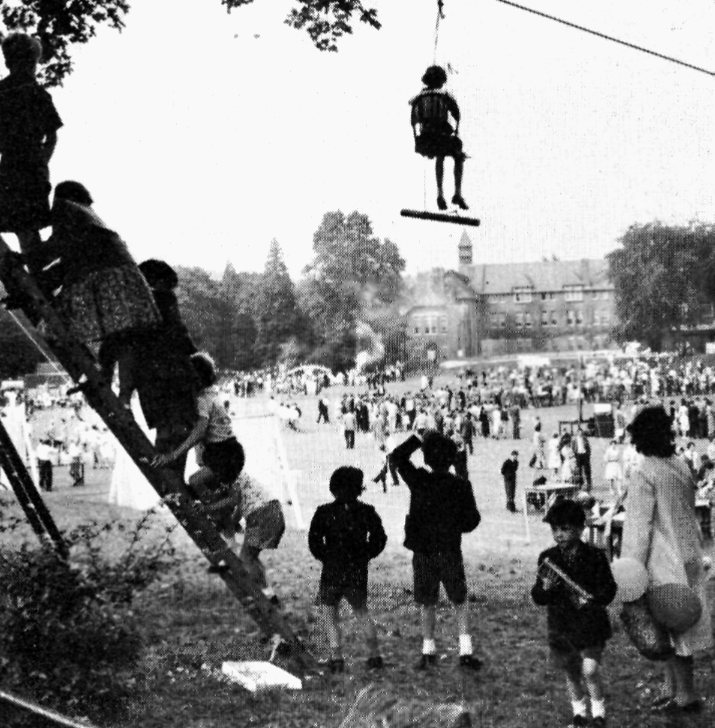
The Summer Fête on Home at Caterham in the mid-20th century, with the Home Front of the Old School in the background.

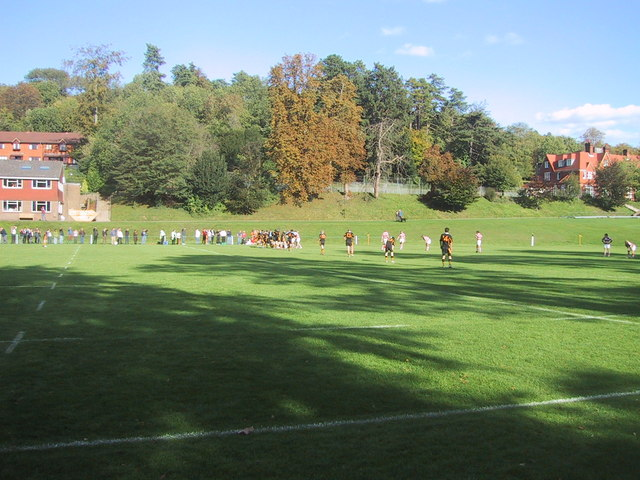
Rugby being played on Home in 2006 with Shirley Goss in the top right.

=== Sports Centre ===
Caterham's earliest sports buildings were the 1884 gymnasium in the inside court (now the Concourse) of the Old School and the now-demolished 1889 swimming bath opened by Sir James Whitehead, then the Mayor of London.

The Sports Centre was built on the parkland opposite the Old School, and opened in November 1996 by the Olympic athlete Sebastian Coe MP. It was refurbished and extended by Miller Bourne architects in 2023 and re-opened by Dame Kelly Holmes in February 2024.

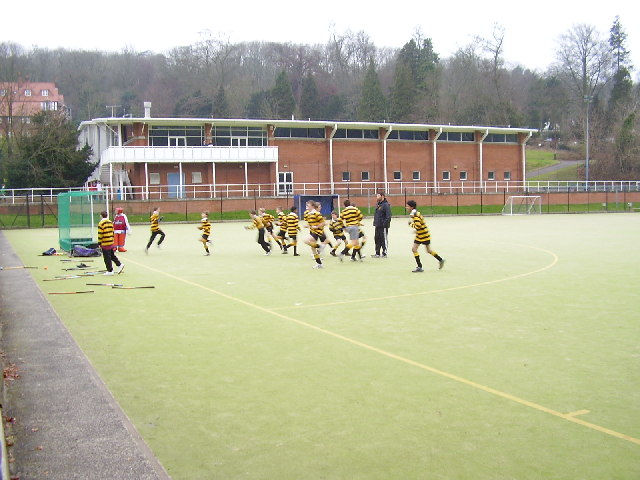
The Sports Centre prior to its 2023 redevelopment and extension.

=== Beech Hanger, Shirley Goss and Mottrams ===
Beech Hanger ('Beech Hanger Court'), Shirley Goss and Mottrams ('Foxburrow') are three Victorian country houses which are within the Caterham estate on the outskirts of the campus. Beech Hanger is a boarding house whilst Shirley Goss and Mottrams house Caterham Prep. The original formal gardens belonging to these country houses largely no longer remain, however elements of Victorian arboretum planting do.

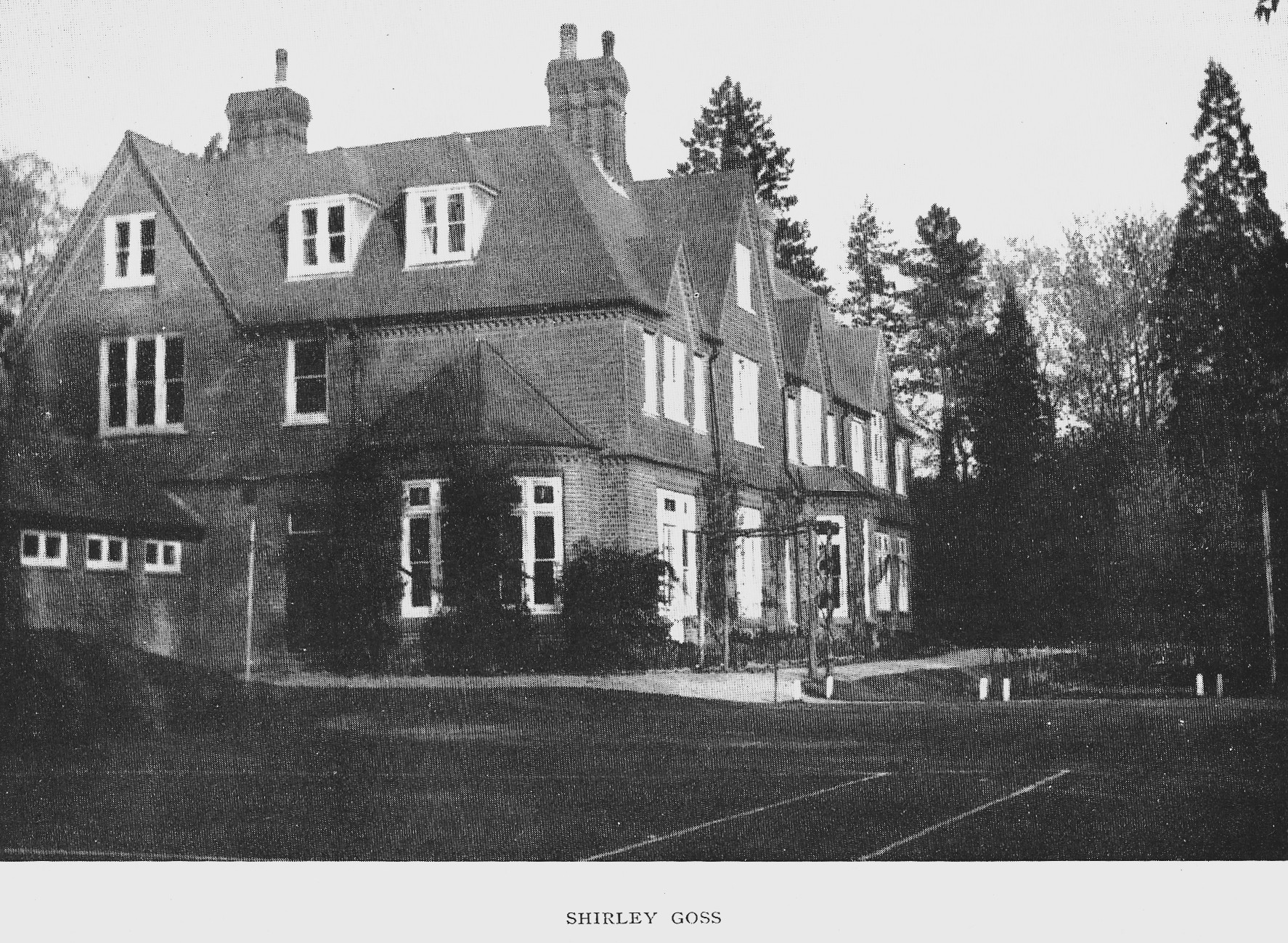
Shirley Goss in the 1940s.

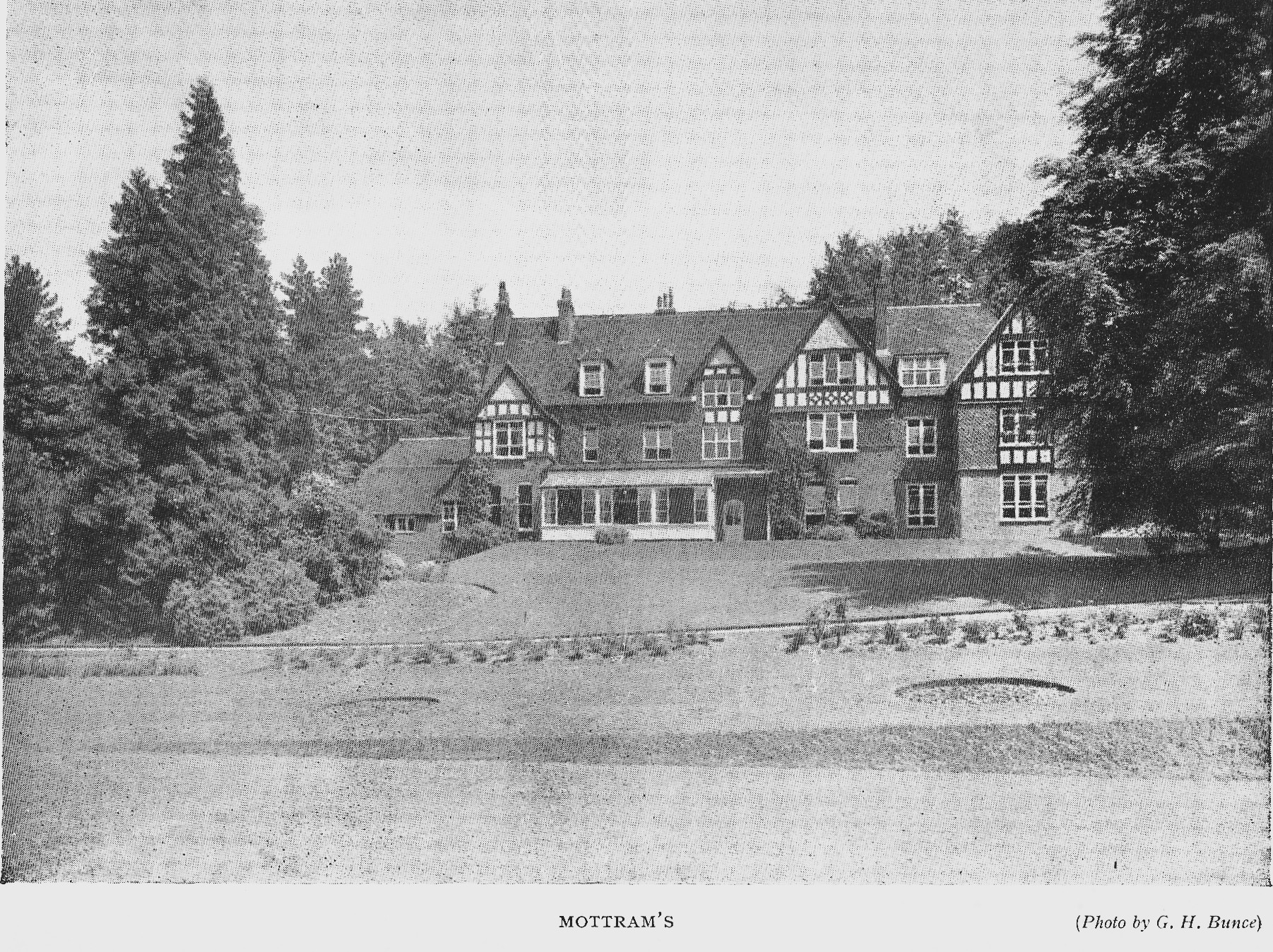
The rose garden at Mottrams (once 'Foxburrow') in the 1940s.

=== Hill Fields ===
Caterham owns sixteen acres of playing fields at Hill Fields in Caterham-on-the-Hill, about a mile away from the school's campus. As Caterham is surrounded by its estate in Harestone Valley, it was difficult to develop further level playing fields within the valley. In December 2017, the Hill Fields Pavilion, designed by Miller Bourne, was opened by Matt Dawson MBE.

== History ==
See also the Headmasters of Caterham

Caterham today is the product of a co-ed merger between the Congregational School (formally renamed 'Caterham' in the mid-1920s) for boys and Eothen School for girls.

=== The Congregational School ('Caterham') ===
==== 1811-1884 ====
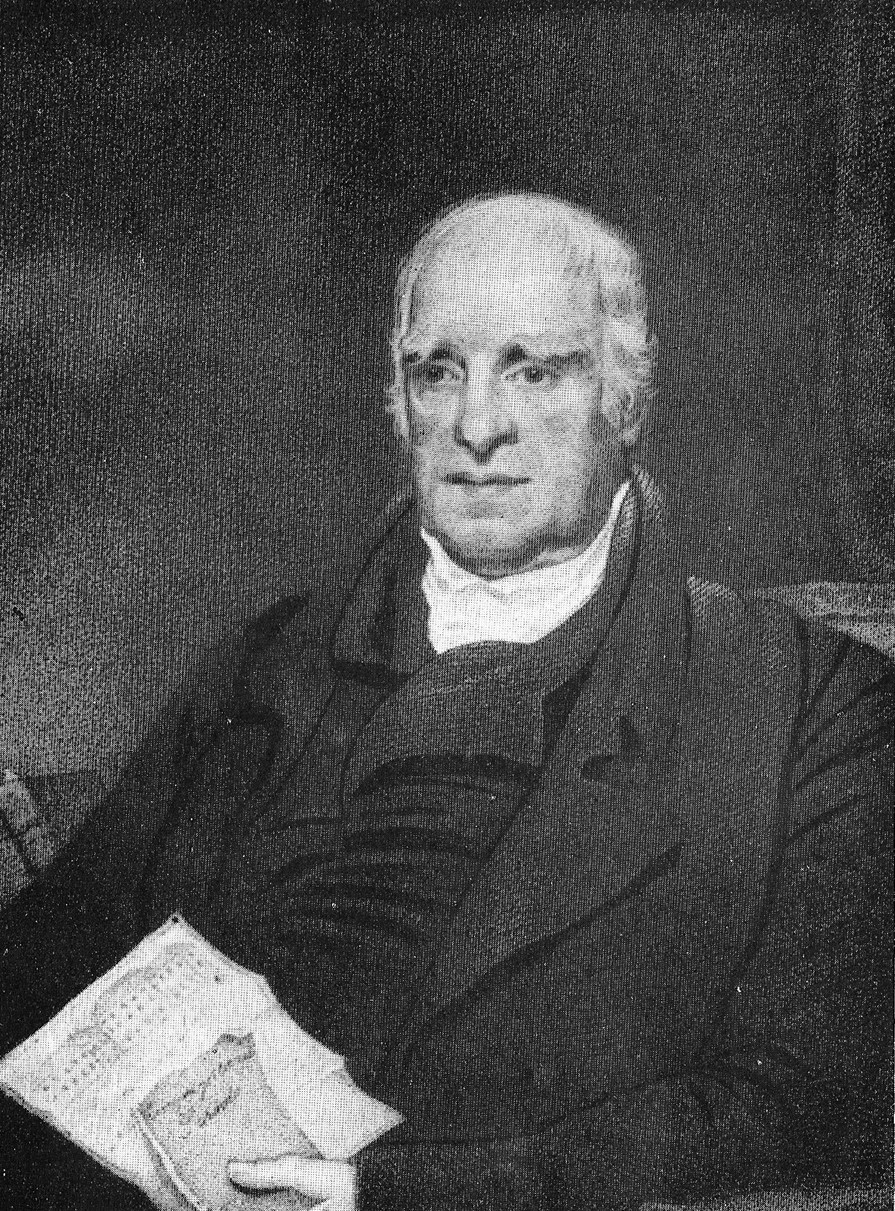
Rev. John Townsend (1757-1826), the founder of Caterham.

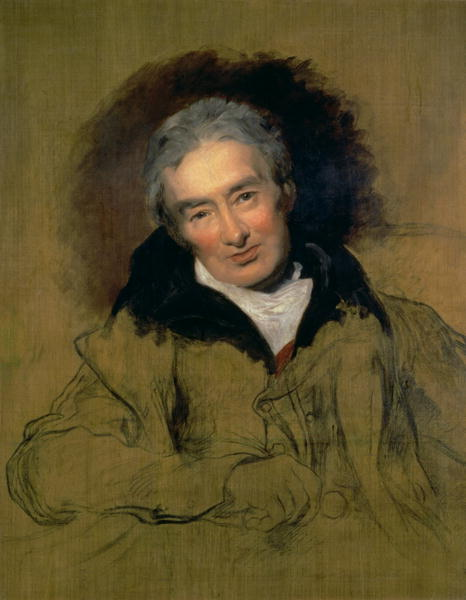
William Wilberforce (1759-1833) as depicted in Sir Thomas Lawrence's unfinished portrait in 1828, when Wilberforce was a governor of the school.

Rev. John Townsend, the minister of the Jamaica Row Chapel at Bermondsey, founded the Congregational School in 1811 at 29 West Square, in Newington, London. The year before he had written to "ministers, officers and all other members and friends" of Congregationalist churches in England to share his concerns about the inadequate standard of education available to their sons. The abolitionist politician and philanthropist William Wilberforce was an early governor of the school until his death in 1833.

In 1815, the school moved to a country house in Lewisham, then a rural village on the outskirts of London. Rev. William J. Hope, the Headmaster from 1823 to 1852, was a close lifelong friend of the historian and philosopher Thomas Carlyle. Hope met Carlyle when they were at school together at Annan Academy before both going to the University of Edinburgh. Though it is possible that Carlyle visited Hope at the school, it would only have been on an informal basis and so there is no record. Carlyle was greatly upset by Hope's death in 1853, which he described as a "mournful complexity of ill news".

One of the earliest school photographs dates to around 1865 and depicts pupils at Lewisham with cricket bats.

The historian Nigel Watson notes that, somewhat unusually for the period, Thomas Rudd - Headmaster from 1859 to 1894 - disapproved of corporal punishment, writing that "I can do better without it". During his tenure of 35 years, Rudd also strengthened the Old Boy network at the school, which contributed to the creation of the Old Caterhamians' London club being established in 1899.

The school was at Lewisham for nearly seventy years, during which time it gained prominence. Samuel Morley, an abolitionist political radical and MP for Bristol was made Treasurer of the school from 1868. William Ewart Gladstone distributed Speech Day prizes to pupils of the school in 1875, the year after his first term as Prime Minister of the United Kingdom.

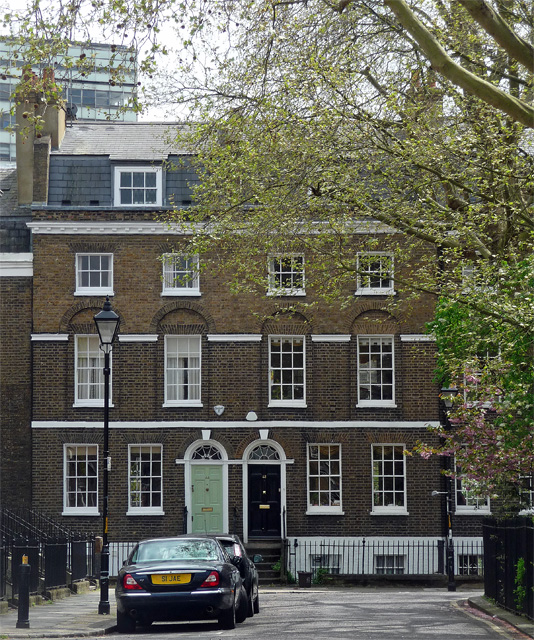
Georgian terraces at West Square, Newington. Caterham was first founded at No.29 in 1811. 'Newington' is now a school house at Caterham.

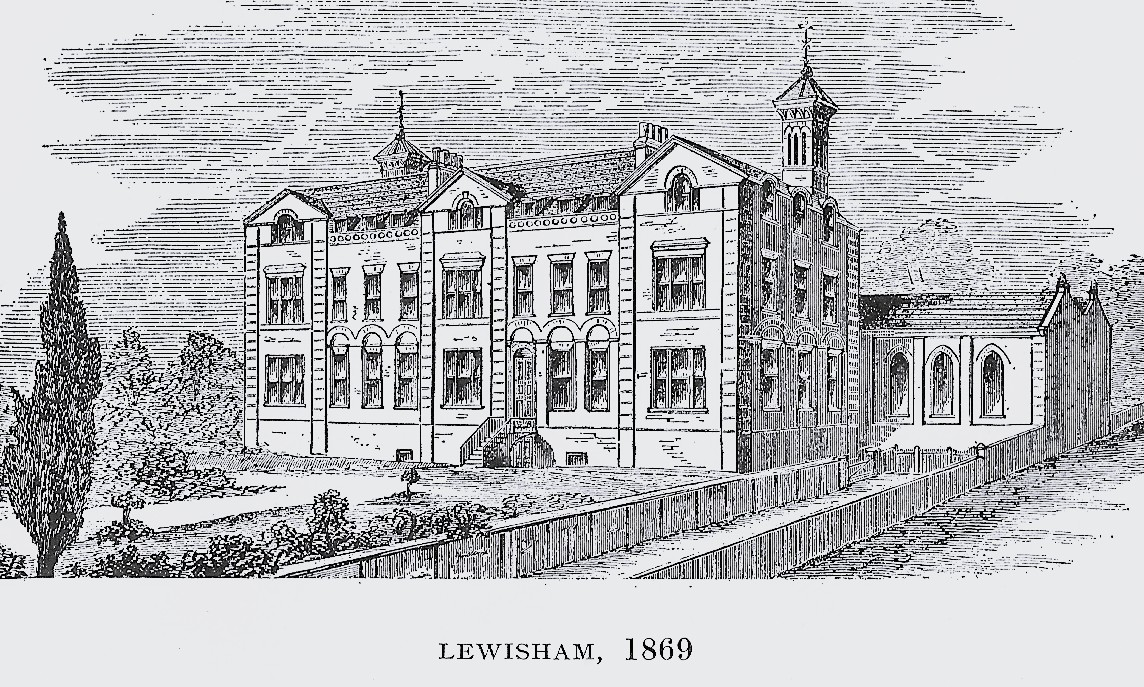
The Congregational School at Lewisham in 1869 after the move there in 1815. 'Lewisham' is also a school house at Caterham today.

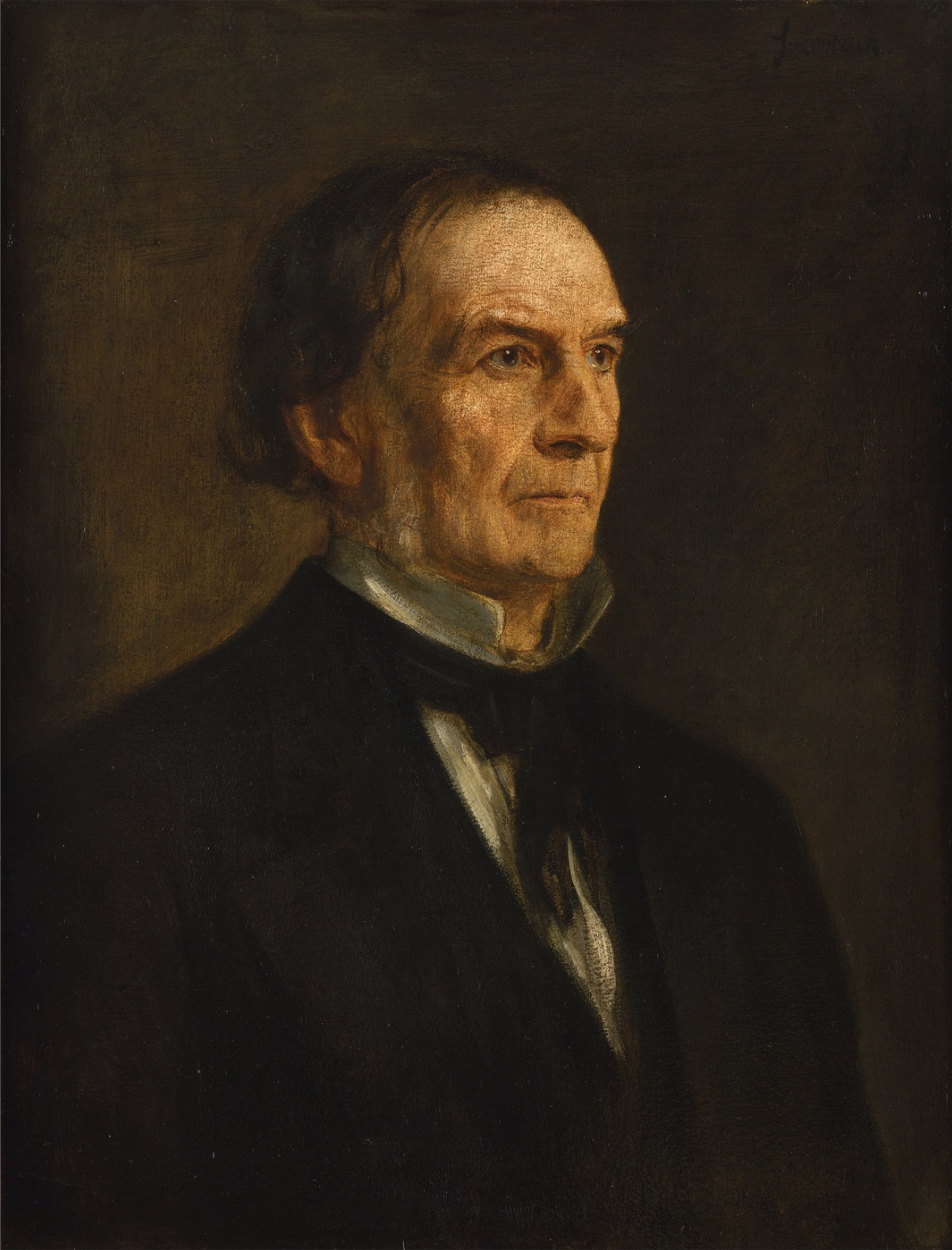
William Ewart Gladstone distributed Speech Day prizes to pupils at the school a year after his first term at Prime Minister of the United Kingdom.

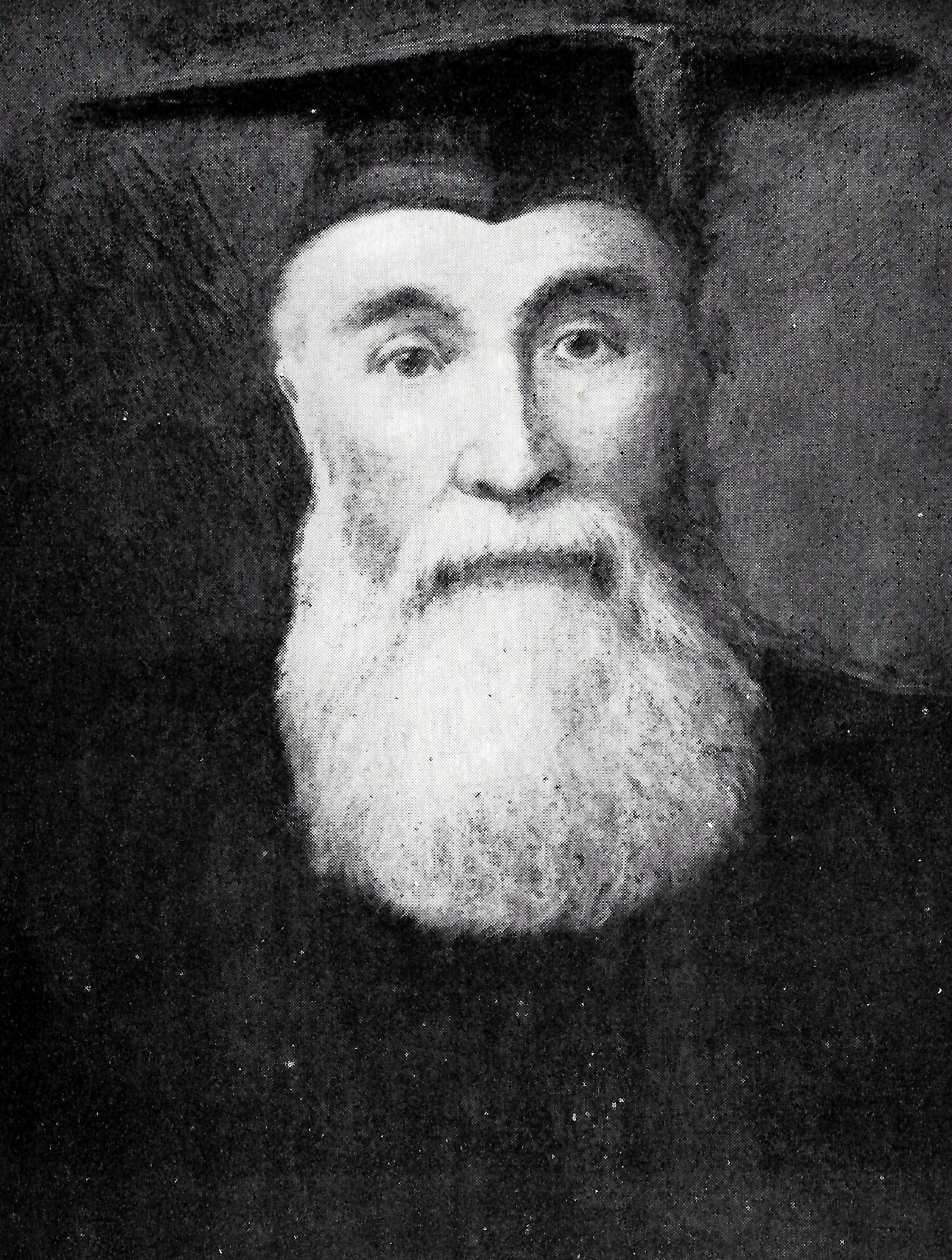
Rev. Thomas Rudd, Headmaster of Caterham from 1859 to 1894, who notably for the period, disapproved of corporal punishment.

The removal of the school from Lewisham was decided for a number of reasons. A key concern was the increasing urbanisation and industrialisation around the school, accelerated from 1858 onwards with the arrival of the East Kent Railway, later the London, Chatham and Dover Railway.

The architect Edward Cooksworthy Robins FRIBA was known for designing educational buildings and was commissioned to design the new school at the present location in Caterham Valley. This was on the site of Withernden, which had been purchased by the school in 1882. Withernden House later became Headmaster's House and its formal garden became the Headmaster's Garden. Robins designed Caterham at the beginning of the Arts-and-Crafts movement and some of his interiors - particularly the floral stained glass within the Wilberforce Hall - are early examples of it. Morley laid the foundation stone in October 1883 and the building opened in 1884.

==== 1884-1914 ====
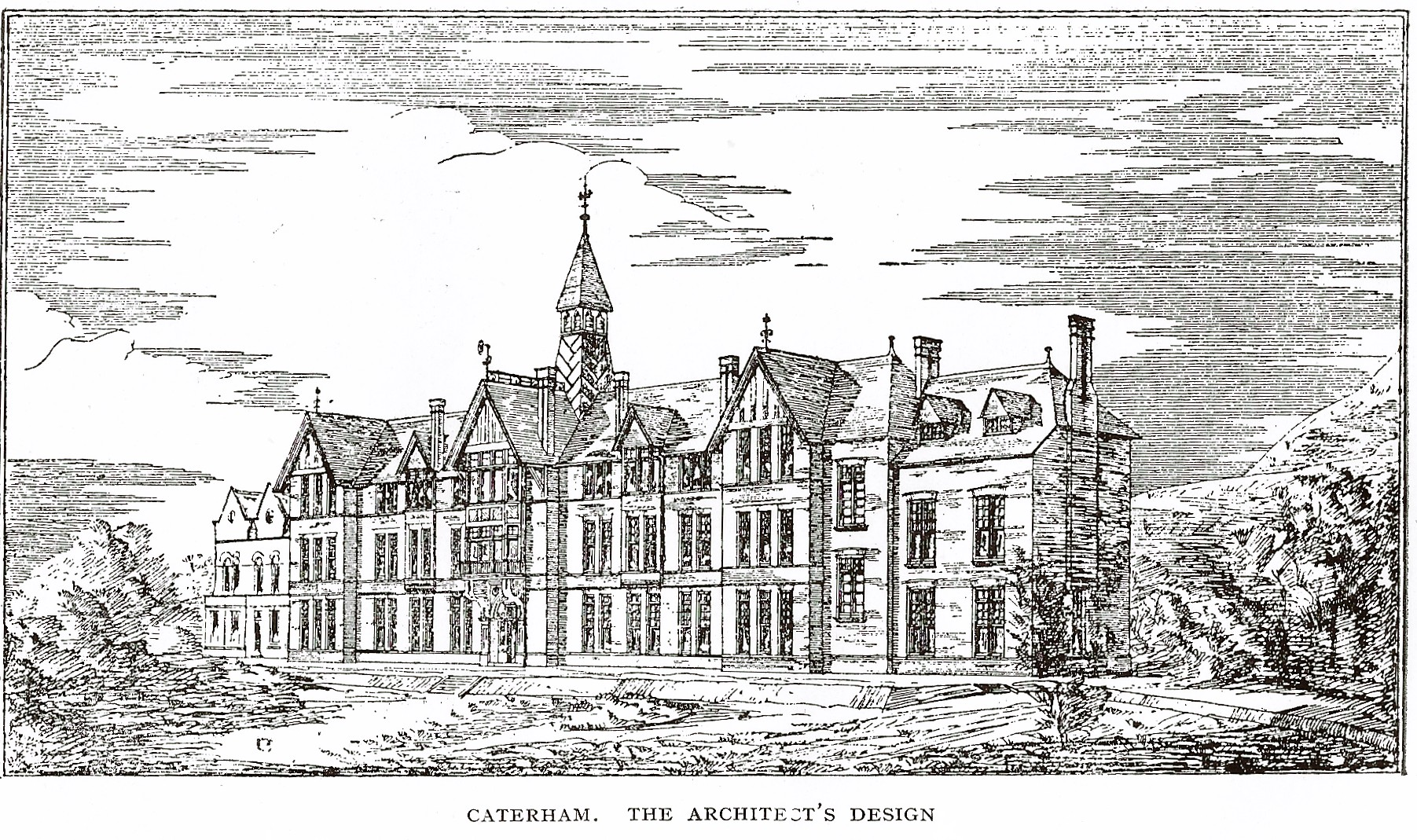
E.C. Robins' design for what is now the Old School at Caterham, an original engraving of which is held at the Wellcome Collection. Headmaster's House is on the far left.

At its opening, what is now the Old School demonstrated the onset of a new curriculum. Hugh Stafford notes that Caterham's original 1884 science laboratory - which no longer exists - was among the earliest in public schools. Similarly, the inside court (now the Concourse) of the Old School was originally planned as a traditional college-like quadrangle but instead was covered with an iron canopy to become a place deemed of greater modern value: a gymnasium fitted for practising new theory on exercise. Sir James Whitehead, then the Lord Mayor of London, opened the 'swimming bath' at Caterham in 1889. In 1890, Caterham School opened its doors to the sons of laymen and to day boys.

The Congregational Church towards the edge of the school estate was altered to also additionally serve as Caterham's school chapel. Stafford, a Master, recounted in the time before electric light that the school procession for evening services in winter "to chapel on a pitch dark night was not an easy task" for the pupils. The school's chamber choir continues to perform at the church to this day.

The school retained its formal name 'The Congregational School' into the early-20th century but began to be colloquially known as 'Caterham' from as early as the 1880s. During this period, it was also colloquially referred to as 'Caterham College'.

In 1899, Old Caterhamians formed a London gentleman's club at premises on Southampton Row (off Russell Square) in Bloomsbury. Dinners, however, were taken at Holborn. It was open each Friday to a network of Old Cats living and working in London and served a circle of important Old Caterhamians in the early 20th century such as Sir John Richard Robinson, editor of The Daily News and Sir Paul Dukes, who would later be recruited by Mansfield Smith-Cumming into the infant MI6. The club also welcomed well-known visitors such as the cartoonist Sir Francis Carruthers Gould. Originally the club was separate from Caterham, but in 1901, it was amalgamated with the Old Caterhamians' Association. The club continued at the same address in Bloomsbury - though albeit eventually with irregular openings - until 1968.

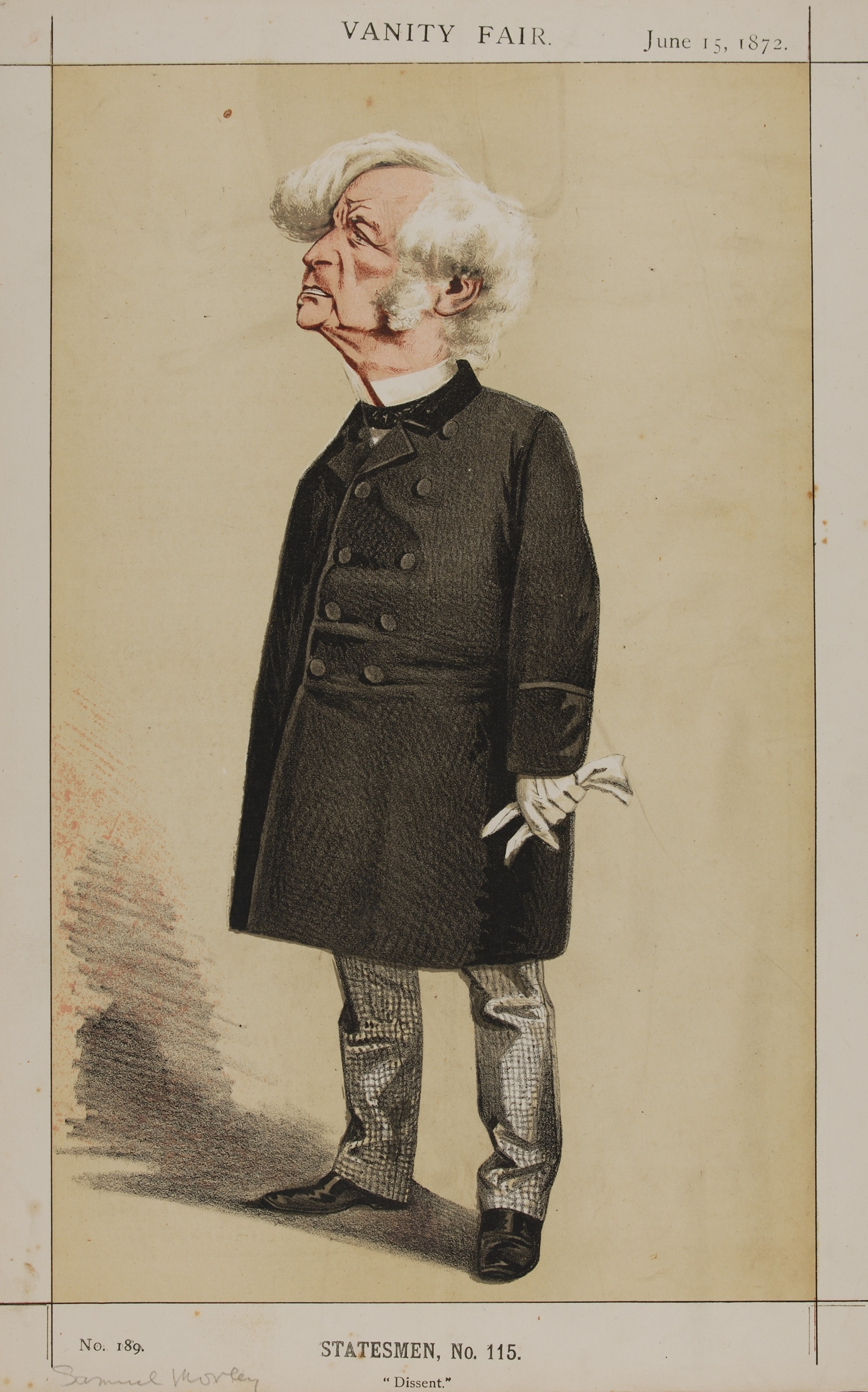
Samuel Morley MP (1809–1886), the political radical and abolitionist illustrated satirically here in Vanity Fair, was once the Chair of Caterham. He laid the foundation stone for E.C. Robins' building on 23 October 1883.

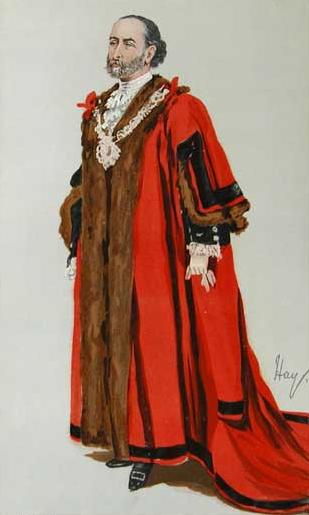
Sir James Whitehead, 1st Baronet (1834-1917), Lord Mayor or London, opened the swimming bath at Caterham in 1889, the same year of this caricature from Vanity Fair.

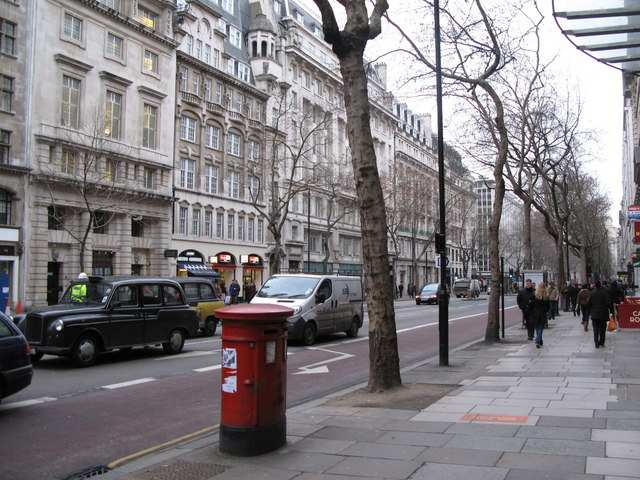
Bloomsbury's Southampton Row, where Old Caterhamians established a club at premises in a building there in 1899 which lasted until 1968. The building has since been demolished.

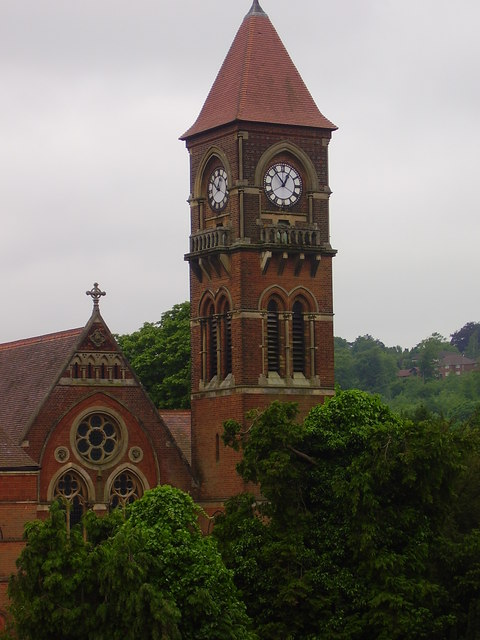
The Caterham Congregational Church (now the URC) was altered to also serve as the school's chapel in the late-19th and early-20th centuries.

==== 1914-1939 ====
In February 1917, the composer Sir Henry Walford Davies (later Master of the King's Music) visited Caterham to deliver a musical lecture and workshop. He discussed his recent experience in organising concerts for soldiers fighting on the Western Front. During the First World War, 69 Old Caterhamians were killed. Caterham commissioned the President of the Royal Society of Sculptors, Sir William Reynolds-Stephens, to sculpt a memorial tablet which was installed into the Vestibule in 1923. In addition to this, to school ran an architectural competition for its Memorial Hall (now housing the Maggs Library), adjudicated by Stanley Hamp FRIBA. The architect, artist and Old Caterhamian Walter Monckton Keesey OBE won the competition and in 1924, exhibited an elevation of the building at the Royal Academy of Arts at Burlington House. Caterham's Memorial Hall was opened in 1925 by William Hulme Lever, 2nd Viscount Leverhulme.

In 1922, Caterham held its first biennial Science Exhibition in the dining hall, now the Wilberforce Hall. This was opened as a temporary museum to the wider community to showcase recent discoveries of the day. In 1924, exhibits included the Autochrome Lumière, Geissler tubes, a cloud chamber (particle detector) designed by C.T.R. Wilson and an aquarium of axolotl which used an early electric aerator. A major engineering interest of the day was the in quickly developing motor-car and motorbike industry, and Caterham collaborated with manufacturers J. A. Prestwich, Triumph and Sturney Archer to create a display of engines and gearboxes. Caterham was loaned exhibition apparati from the Cambridge Scientific Instrument Company (which supplied the University of Cambridge) and Taylor Hobson. Such a university-level scientific focus was unique among public schools at the time.

In 1924, the Headmaster Alan Percival Mottram was admitted to the Headmasters' Conference (now the HMC).

In March 1926, the composer Ralph Vaughan Williams visited Caterham to watch a performance of a condensed version of his two-act opera 'Hugh the Drover', premiered in 1924. Caterham's production was prominent enough for 'The Times' to report on it: Vaughan Williams was said to be moved and afterwards believed "that the sincerity of the whole performance had shown him the points at which the music itself lacked sincerity". He went on to revise the opera throughout his life.

In February 1932, Lt Col Richard Henry Heslop (later the SOE agent codenamed 'Xavier' in the Second World War) visited Caterham to present a lecture on 'Africa' with a film projector.

In 1934, the historian D.G.E. Hall was made Headmaster and resided at Headmaster's House at Caterham. There, in addition to his role, he researched and wrote 'Europe and Burma: A study of European Relations with Burma to the Annexation of Thibaw's Kingdom,1886' which was published by Oxford in 1945. This work completed whilst at Caterham laid foundations for his later 'A History of Southeast Asia' (1955), which Milton Osborne said was to "...remain the most important single history of the region, providing encyclopaedic coverage of material published up to the time of its 1981 revision."

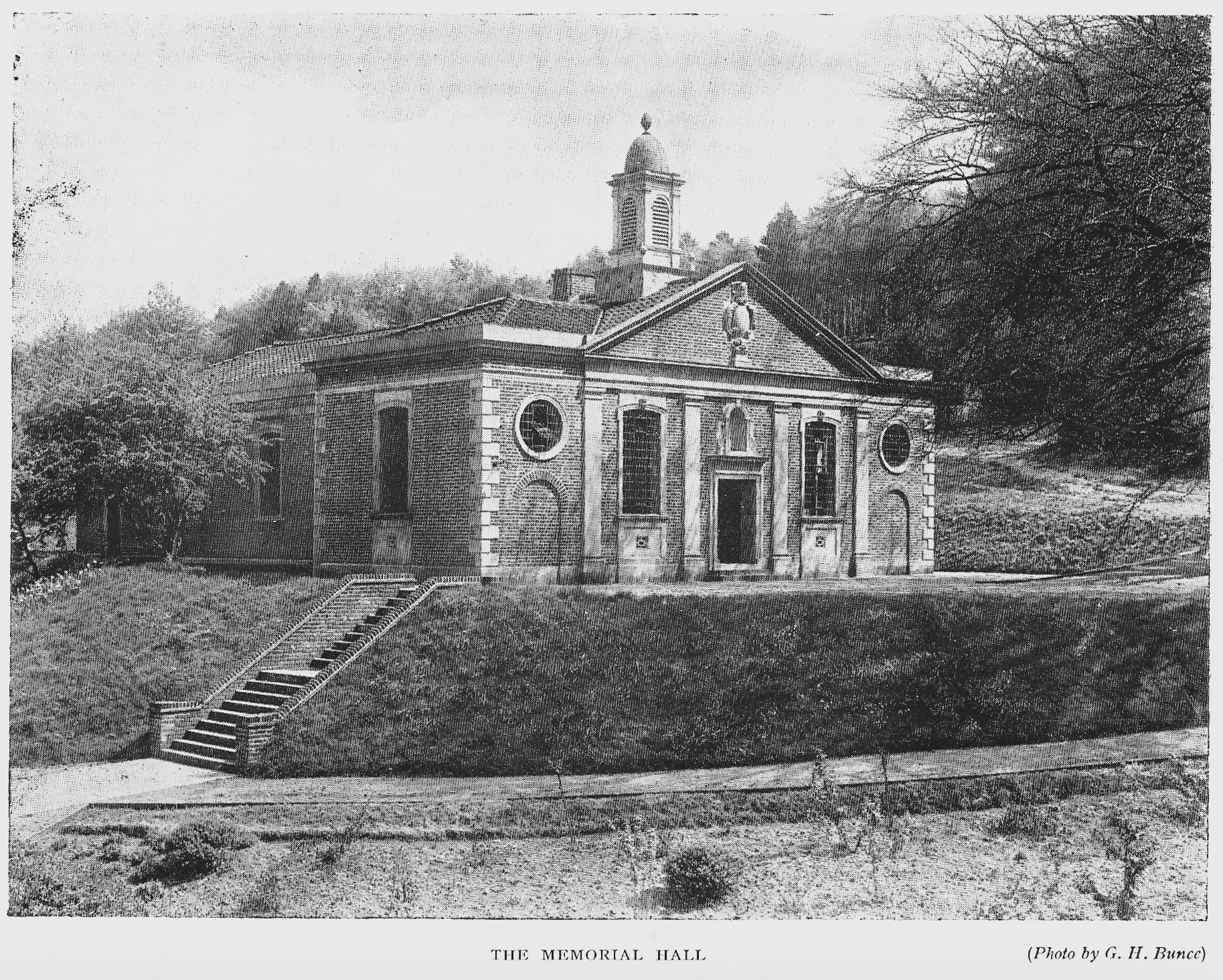
The Memorial Hall at Caterham, shortly after it was opened in 1925.

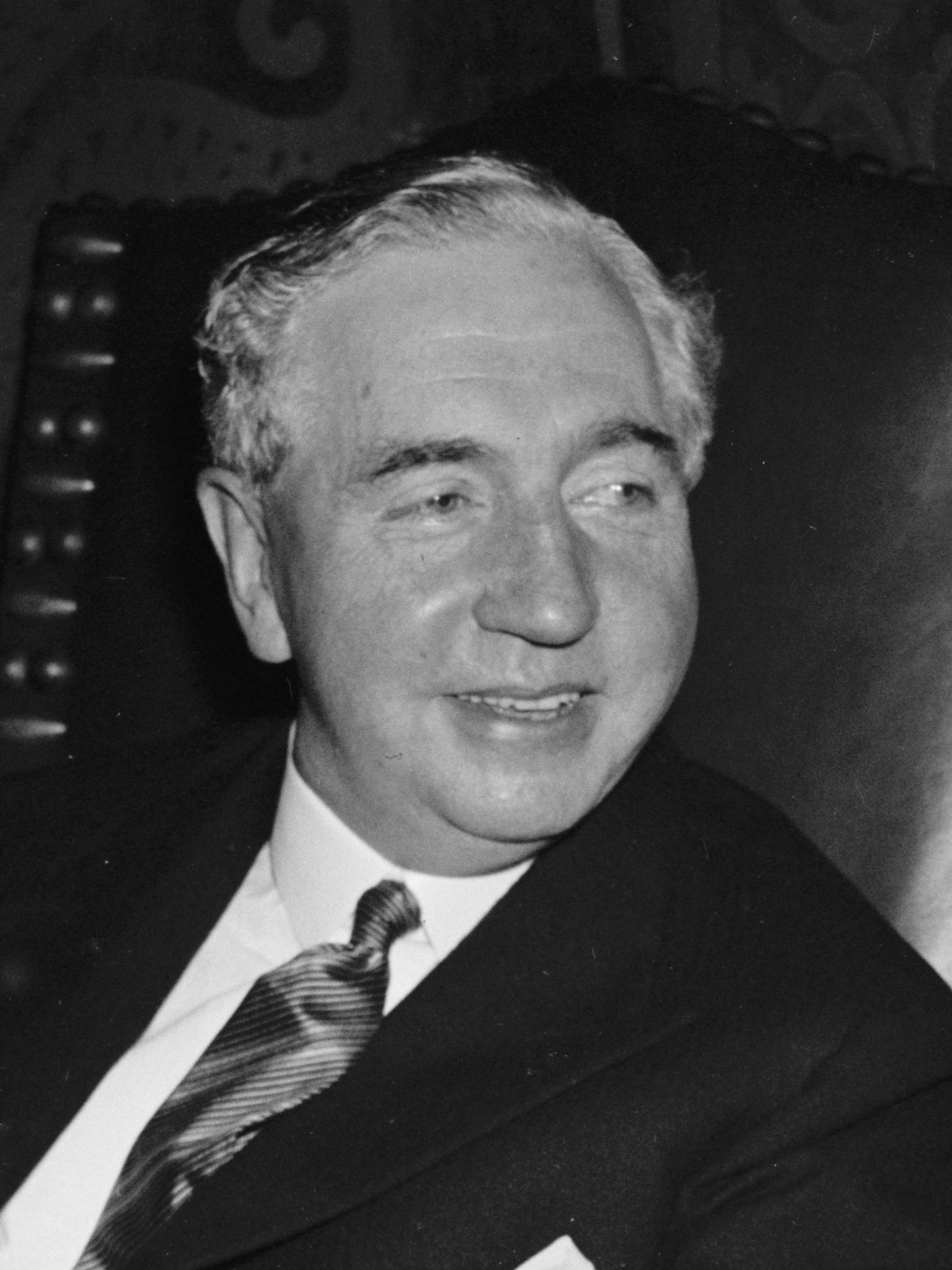
William Hulme Lever, 2nd Viscount Leverhulme (1888-1949) was a Chair and benefactor of Caterham, and opened the Memorial Hall in July 1925.

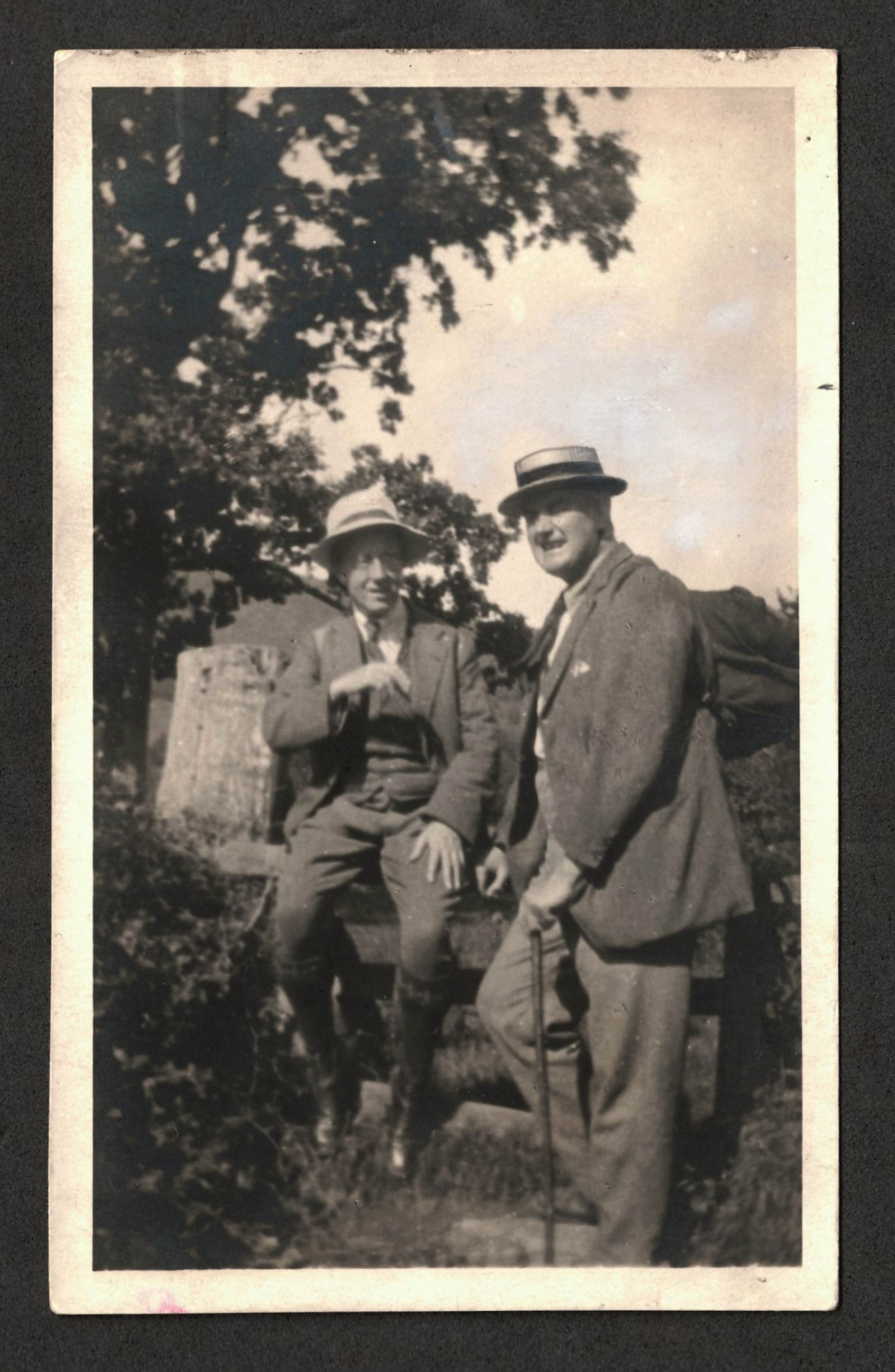
Composers Gustav Holst (left) and Ralph Vaughan Williams (right) in 1921. The Times reported that Vaughan Williams was greatly moved when he saw Caterham's performance of his opera Hugh the Drover in 1926. Holst's daughter Imogen attended and later taught at Eothen, which merged with Caterham in 1995.

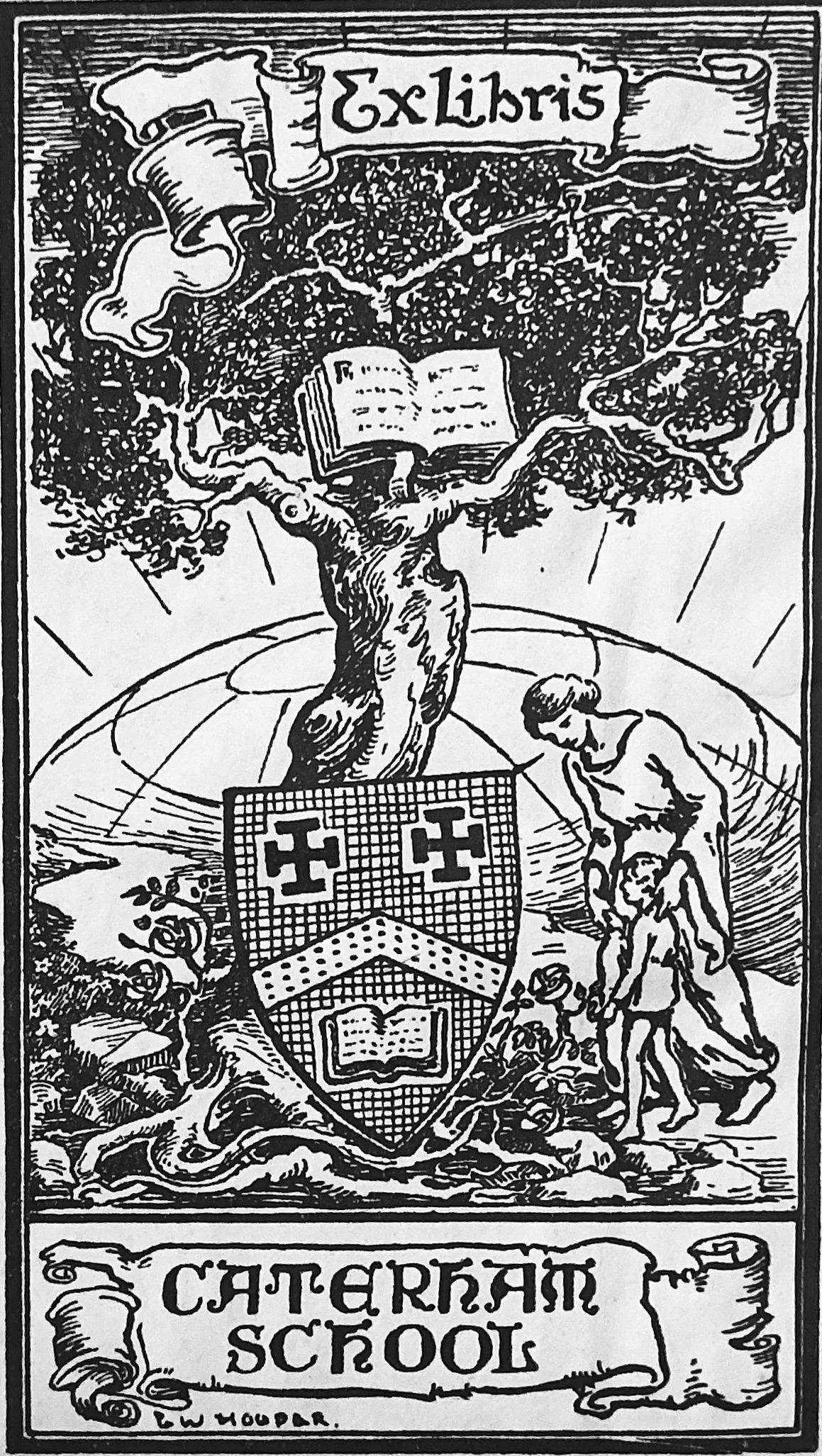
Caterham's engraved bookplate from 1926.

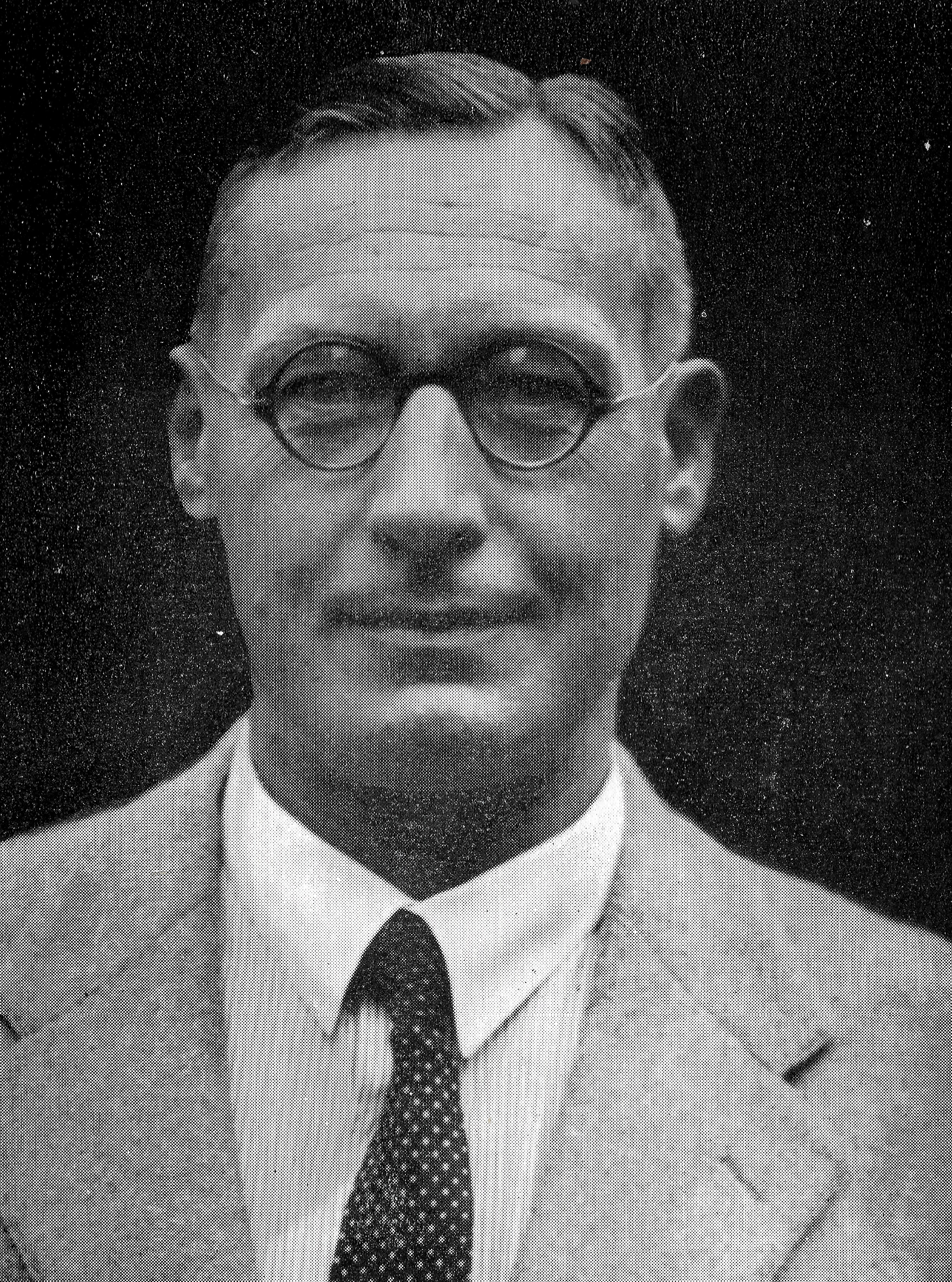
The historian D.G.E. Hall, Headmaster of Caterham from 1934 to 1949.

The bass vocalist Robert Easton was invited to the school in January 1939 following his lead in the Royal Albert Hall debut of Ralph Vaughan Williams' Serenade to Music and gave a concert which took place in what is now Caterham's Rudd Hall, then newly-built.

==== 1939-1995 ====
In 1985, the pianist Peter Katin visited Caterham to present a piano recital at the Memorial Hall, now the Maggs Library. He is reported to have disliked Caterham's antique Steinway and so the school arranged to have it replaced to his liking in time for his next recital there in 1987.

=== Eothen ===
==== 1892-1995 ====
In 1892, Catherine Pye founded a school for girls in a house at Harestone Hill in Caterham with her sister Winifred. Pye was born in 1869 and in 1890 received an exhibition to attend Newnham College at the University of Cambridge under its first principal, the early suffragist Anne Clough. The founding of Eothen was a result of changing perspectives about the standards and objectives of female education.

The Misses Pye were particularly focused on preparing pupils to receive places at universities, with the historian Nigel Watson noting that even by the early-20th century, "such occurrences were still rare" which explains Eothen's early tradition "to celebrate every university place by lighting up the school grounds with Chinese lanterns and fairy lamps." In 1897, the school admitted boarders and was named 'Eothen', an Ancient Greek term for "from the dawn." Over the decades, surrounding Victorian houses were incorporated into the school. Eothen's grounds were adjacent to the Congregational Church of Caterham, which also served as the school chapel for Caterham School.

Eothen had a reputation for music under the composer Jane Joseph who taught there from 1916 and wrote the school's song in 1928. The composer Imogen Holst was one of her pupils, and Holst later returned to Eothen to also teach in 1932. In 1939, Holst wrote the Eothen suite for small orchestra. Through Holst's musical connections, Ralph Vaughan Williams visited and the Russian pianist Nina Milkina gave her first concert in England at Eothen.

Eothen was bombed twice during the Second World War, once in 1941 and again, more seriously in 1944. No lives were lost. In 1981, Eothen pupils were admitted to the Sixth Form at Caterham. The school's centenary service was held at Southwark Cathedral in 1992 but by the following year it was considering a merger with Caterham, which took place in 1995. Upon merger, Caterham adopted Eothen's motto of 'Veritas Sine Timore' (Truth Without Fear).

The Pye Centre at Caterham was later named in memory of the Misses Pye.

=== Caterham ===
==== 1995- ====
After the merger with Eothen in 1995, Caterham became fully co-educational.

In 2010, Breck Bednar joined the First Form at Caterham and left in 2012 before his 2014 murder due to online grooming. After his death, Caterham fundraised for the Breck Foundation which was established in his memory to spread awareness about online safeguarding.

2011 marked two centuries since the founding of Caterham. In October 2011, the bicentenary service was held at Westminster Abbey and conducted by the Dean of Westminster, Dr John Hall. The bicentenary banner used in the service is now housed in Caterham's Wilberforce Hall. Over 2000 people were invited to the service.

In February 2012, HRH Prince Edward, Duke of Kent, visited Caterham to meet the Headmaster Julian Thomas and Head Boy and Head Girl. He opened the school's redeveloped Leathem Pavilion and reviewed the CCF.

In 2023, Caterham was awarded 'Best Independent School of the Year' in the United Kingdom by the Times Educational Supplement. In the same year, it was the first and only school in the UK to receive three 'Key Areas of Strength' in its latest ISI inspection. It is also an 'Apple Distinguished School'.

In August 2025, The Times reported that Caterham achieved the highest percentage of GCSE grade 9s across all co-ed private schools in Surrey and Kent, placing it sixth in the UK.

In September 2025, along with Eton, Brighton, Canford and Gresham's, Caterham was shortlisted for the 2026 Tatler Schools Guide Awards for the title of best public school in the country.

In 2025, Caterham was ranked by The Sunday Times as 38th out of the UK's highest achieving 100 independent schools (on combined GCSE and A-Level results), placing it within the top 1.5% of independent schools within the UK.

Caterham has been recognised as a member of the 'Edtech 50' group formed under The Education Foundation think tank based in Westminster. A major factor for this is Caterham's own subsidiary, Sphynx AI.

== Admissions ==
=== Fees ===
As of 2025, Caterham's fees for day pupils from First Form to Upper Sixth Form are £9,210 per term, with the exception of entry to the Sixth Form, which is £9,610 per term. This places it above the average for HMC schools which £5,299 per term for day pupils. The full boarding fee at Caterham can reach at most £20,145 per term which is similarly above the HMC schools average of £12, 816 per term for boarding pupils.

=== Scholarships and bursaries ===
The school may award a scholarship if the applicant performs exceptionally well on the entrance exam tests. The scholarships can be for academics, art, design, innovation, music, sport, performing arts, or all-rounder. The academic scholarships are up to 30% off the school fees. The school also has a bursaries scheme for children of United Reformed Church ministers, for families in the armed forces or those on a low income.

== Publications ==
Caterham produces a number of in-house publications each year. 'The Caterhamian' and 'Omnia' are edited by school staff and there are three longstanding, annual student-led publications.

=== 'The Caterhamian' and 'Omnia' ===
The earliest of Caterham's publications date back to January 1888 with the 'Magazine of the Congregational School, Caterham Valley' which continues to this day with the annual review named 'The Caterhamian'. 'Omnia' (the first word of the original motto) is the magazine for Old Caterhamians.

=== 'Cat Among the Pigeons' ===
'Cat Among the Pigeons' is the magazine for the arts and humanities which named after a Speech Day prize established by Geoffrey Pidgeon OC, an MI6 officer and later author. The Pidgeon Prize for Literature at Caterham aims to "promote creative and intellectual writing endeavours."

=== 'Quantum Ultimatum' ===
'Quantum Ultimatum' is Caterham's academic journal for the sciences and the magazine of its Moncrieff-Jones Society, named after Sir Alan Moncrieff CBE OC, who established the first premature-baby unit in 1947.

=== 'Preview' ===
'Preview' is Caterham's magazine for politics. The 2010 issue of Preview was launched at the Palace of Westminster with the Speaker of the House of Commons, John Bercow giving a speech. That year, MPs David Laws (Liberal Democrats), Michael Fallon (Conservative) and Nigel Farage (UKIP) contributed articles to the magazine. The 2011 launch of Preview took place at Westminster Cathedral Hall, with Nigel Evans as speaker and Michael Gove in attendance. Contributors to the 2011 issue included Lord Geoffrey Howe, Sam Gyimah and Daniel Hannan with Nicola Jennings of The Guardian producing the cartoons.

== Events ==
The following traditional events, some of which Caterham opens to the wider community, are ordered chronologically for the academic year:

=== Twilights ===
'Twilights' are concerts held regularly at Caterham throughout the year in the Wilberforce Hall, beginning before and ending after sunset. They follow a long tradition from the 19th century of musical evening entertainments in the Wilberforce. Sir Paul Dukes and Eric Thiman performed at these concerts when they were pupils at Caterham.

=== Chapel and Chamber ===
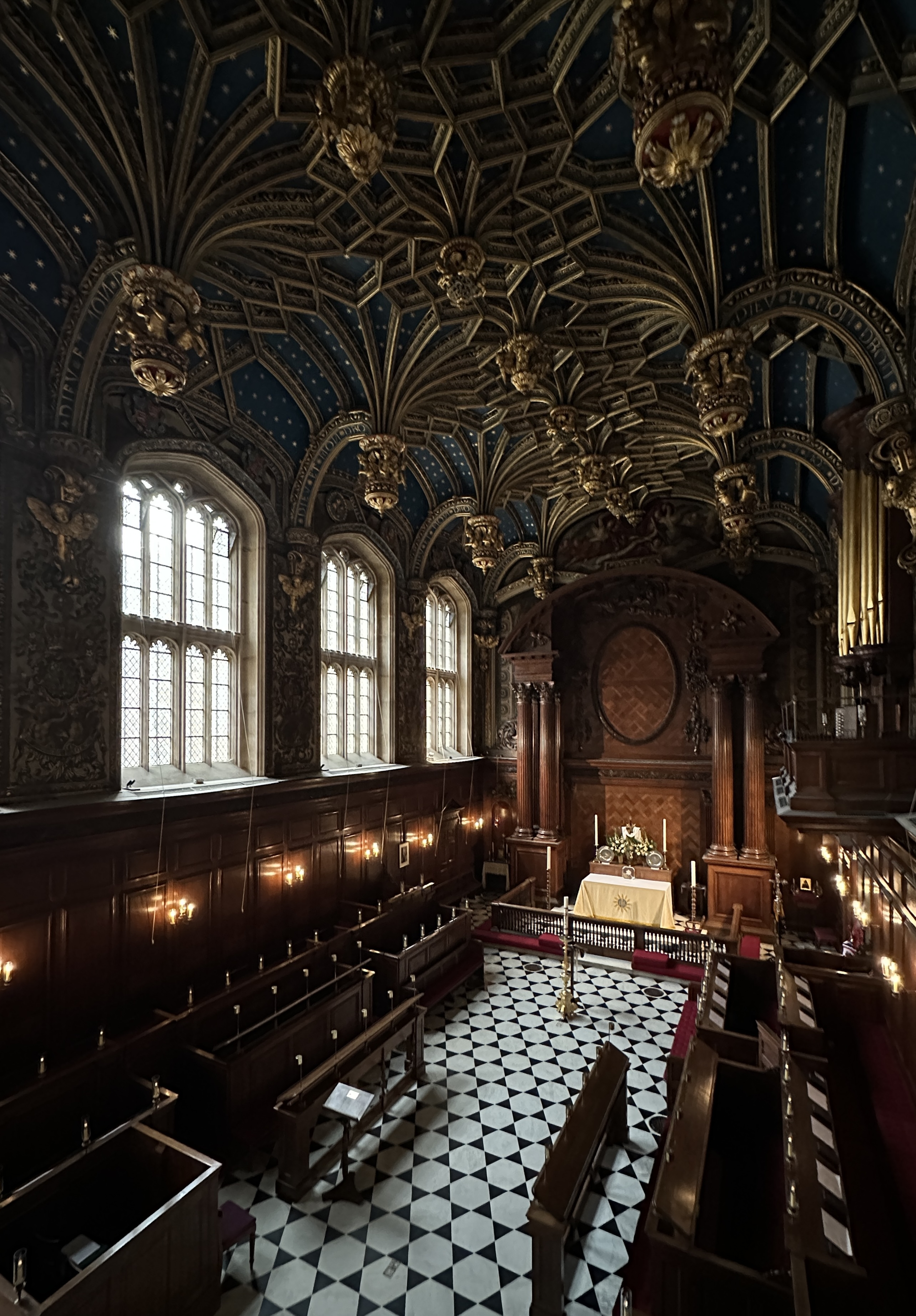
The choirs have performed Evensong twice at the Chapel Royal, Hampton Court

Concerts of the Caterham School Chapel and/or Chamber Choirs are known to the wider community because they are public performances in London and Europe throughout the year. The Chamber has also been broadcast on BBC Radio 3. Concerts in recent years have taken place at the Chapel Royal, Hampton Court, St James' Church, Piccadilly, St John's Church, Waterloo, Arundel Cathedral and the Basilica of Sainte-Thérèse, Lisieux. In 2020, the choir sang Mass at St. Peter's Basilica, Vatican City.

=== Armistice Day and Remembrance Sunday ===
On the Armistice, a silence is observed with a whole school assembly before the Old School. Traditionally, the Headmaster lays a wreath at the school memorial on behalf of the staff and the Head Boy and Head Girl on behalf of the pupils. Caterham's service on Remembrance Sunday often serves the wider local community as well as the school. The 'Roll of Honour' is read by the Head Boy and Head Girl before readings by the Headmaster and members of staff who have undertaken military service. The Director of Music then conducts a Service for Reflection and Remembrance in the Wilberforce Hall.

=== History Festival ===
Since 2023, the Department of History at Caterham organises the annual History Festival in November, held at both theatres in the Performing Arts Centre. It is open to the wider educational community, with students from all schools admitted by ticket for free. Caterham is the only school in the world to run an annual event of this type for the public as well as its own community.

Speakers have included two recipients of the Wolfson History Prize, two academics knighted for services to history, two presenters of documentaries for the BBC and an editor of 'History Today'.

Year	Speaker	Position or speciality	Book in discussion
2023	James Barr	Visiting fellow at King's College London	A Line in the Sand: Britain, France and the Struggle that Shaped the Middle East (2011)
2023	Thomas Cryer	PhD student of American Civil Rights at UCL Faculty of Social & Historical Sciences	
2023	Marion Gibson	Professor of Renaissance and Magical Literatures at Exeter	Witchcraft: A History in Thirteen Trials (2023)
2023	Paul Lay	Editor of 'History Today'	Providence Lost: The Rise and Fall of Cromwell's Protectorate (2020)
2023	Giles Milton	Writer and journalist specialising in narrative history	Checkmate in Berlin: The Cold War Showdown That Shaped the Modern World (2021)
2023	Sir Anthony Seldon	Political biographer of seven British Prime Ministers	Johnson at 10 (2023)
2024	Sir Richard J. Evans	Regius Professor of History at Cambridge, expert witness in Irving v Penguin Books and winner of the 1988 Wolfson Prize	The Coming of the Third Reich (2003), The Third Reich In Power (2005), The Third Reich at War (2008)
2024	Geoffrey Hosking	Historian of Russia and the Soviet Union	
2024	Clare Jackson	Senior tutor at Trinity Hall, Cambridge and winner of the 2022 Wolfson Prize	Devil-Land: England under Siege, 1588-1688 (2021)
2024	Linda Porter	Historian and historical novelist	
2025	James Hawes	Historian and novelist	The Shortest History of England (2020)
2025	Suzannah Lipscomb	Historian, broadcaster, Professor Emerita at the University of Roehampton and Senior Member at St Cross College, Oxford	
2025	Iain MacGregor	Historian and publisher	The Hiroshima Men (2025)
2025	Jonathan Phillips	Professor of Crusading History at Royal Holloway, University of London	The Life and Legend of the Sultan Saladin (2018)

=== Nine Lessons and Carols ===
The Department of Music at Caterham follow the 'Festival of Nine Lessons and Carols' of King's College, Cambridge for the Christmas Service at Caterham. It traditionally took place at the Congregational Church which also served as the School Chapel, but has been moved to St. John's Church, Caterham Valley in recent years.

St John's (1881), where the Caterham Nine Lessons and Carols is conducted and read.

=== The Moncrieff-Jones Christmas Lecture ===
(or the 'Christmas Lecture')

Similar to the idea of the Royal Institution Christmas Lectures, this is an event often opened to the wider community and hosted by Caterham's Moncrieff-Jones society, named after the paediatrician and Old Caterhamian Professor Sir Alan Moncrieff. Nick Lane gave the 2016 Christmas Lecture.

=== The Bonarjee Lecture ===
Similar to the idea of the Reith Lectures of the BBC, the annual Bonarjee Lecture at Caterham explores topics on "free speech, a free media and democracy" and is named after the BBC journalist and Old Caterhamian Stephen Bonarjee. John Humphrys gave the 2019 Bonarjee Lecture.

=== Speech Day ===
Speech Day at Caterham is the closing of the academic year and is held on the first Saturday of July, where prizegiving also takes place.

==== Speakers ====
Distributors of prizes and/ or guest speakers have included the Prime Minister William Gladstone in 1875, the Deputy Prime Minister Geoffrey Howe in 1982 and the Secretary of State for Education Keith Joseph in 1984.

In recent years, speakers have included Brian Blessed OBE and Dame Maggie Aderin.

==== Prizes ====
The 'special' non-subject, named prizes at Speech Day include:

- The Pidgeon Prize for Literature, traditionally selected from Cat Among the Pigeons.
- The Chilcott Prize for Composition (after Bob Chilcott)
- The Young, Frederic H. Gay and Alden Davies Prizes awarded to the winners of the Caterham 'IRP' (Independent Research Project).
- The Moncrieff Jones Prize for Sciences (after Professor Sir Alan Moncrieff)
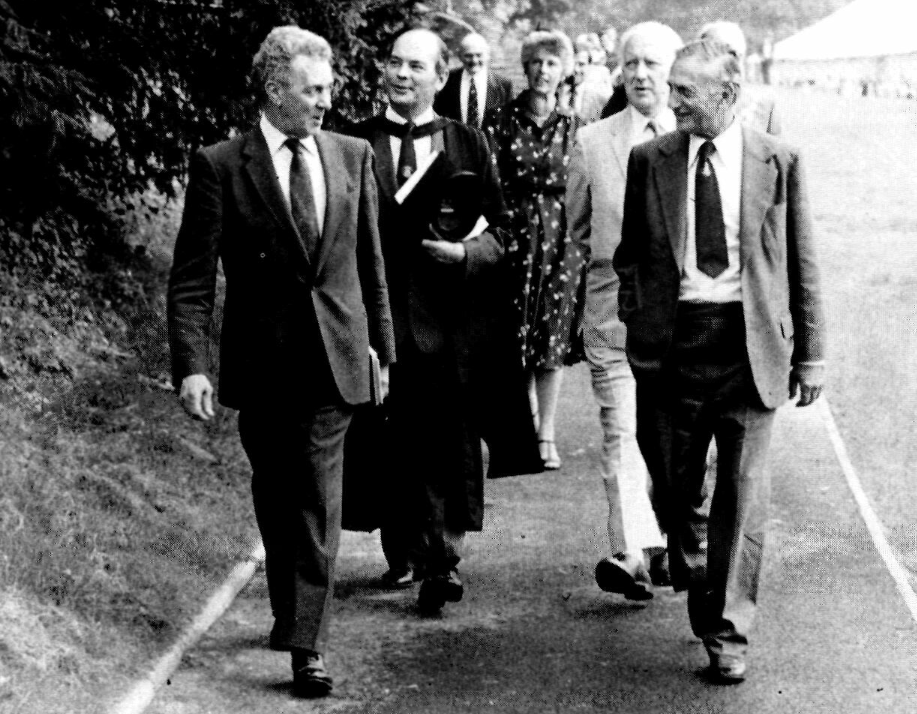
Sir Keith Joseph (then Secretary of State for Education under Margaret Thatcher) walking past Home with headmaster Stephen Smith on Speech Day in 1984

== Houses ==
There are nine school houses at Caterham, six mixed for day pupils, two for boarding boys and one for boarding girls. Most are named after places, whilst the boys boarding houses are named after people, associated with the school.

=== Day ===
Aldercombe Harestone Lewisham Newington Ridgefield Underwood

=== Boarding ===
Beech Hanger Townsend Viney

== Headmasters ==
Ceri Jones is the fourteenth Headmaster of Caterham (or once called 'The Congregational School') and has served in that office since 2015. Previously Second Master at Tonbridge School, Jones took over from Julian Thomas, who went on to become Master of Wellington College. Jones co-founded the Accelerate and Access educational charity.

Notable headmasters include Rev. William Hope who was a close lifelong friend of Thomas Carlyle, Allan Mottram who had also been an Old Caterhamian, the historian D.G.E. Hall who went on to become a Professor Emeritus at the University of London and Lt Col Terrence Leathem who was involved in leading intelligence operations at Bletchley Park during the Second World War.

Caterham's headmasters traditionally resided at Headmaster's House.

Headmasters of Caterham School
1811-1815	Rev. J. Thomas
1815-1817	Rev. J.J. Richards
1817-1823	Rev. J. Simper
1823-1852	Rev. William J. Hope
1852-1859	Rev. J. Lister
1859-1894	Rev. Thomas L. Rudd BA
1894-1910	Rev. Horace E. Hall MA
1910-1934	Mr. Allan Percival Mottram BSc OC
1934-1949	Dr. Daniel George Edward Hall MA, DLit, FR HistS, FRAS
1949-1973	Lt Col Terrence R. Leathem MA (Cantab), JP
1973-1995	Mr. Stephen R. Smith (Cantab)
1995-2007	Mr. Robert A.E. Davey MA (Palmes Academiques)
2007-2015	Mr. Julian P. Thomas BSc (Cantab), MBA, FRSA
2015-	Mr. Ceri W. Jones MA (Cantab), MEd, FRSA, FCCT

== Governance ==
Caterham is governed by both traditional and modern models: the Foundation and the Board of Trustees, the highest positions within or on which are the 'President' and the 'Chair' of Caterham, respectively.

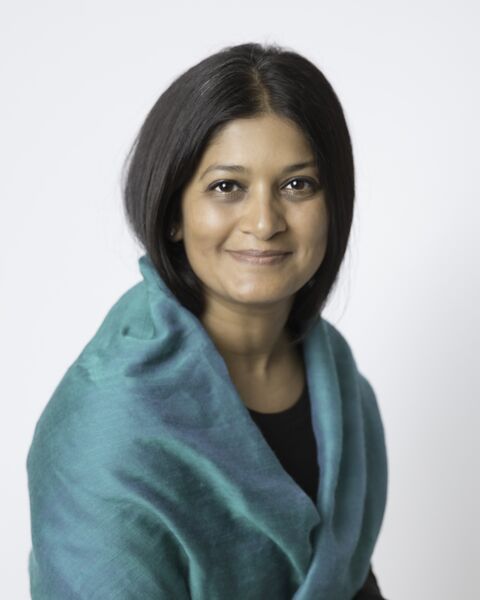
Monisha Shah, the Chair of Trustees

The incumbent Chair of Trustees is Monisha Shah, a media professional who is also the Chair of the King's Council Selection Panel and has served as a trustee of Wikimedia UK, the Royal Collection Trust, the National Gallery and the Tate and as a member on the Committee on Standards in Public Life. The incumbent President is the Honourable Mr. Justice Graeme Mew. Notable previous holders of this office include William Lever, Viscount Leverhulme, Sir Alan Moncrieff and General Sir Alex Harley.

Caterham is the only school in the UK where the governance of the Board of Trustees involves a separate 'Shadow Board' consisting of Old Caterhamians under thirty.

== Partnerships ==
Caterham aims to run and develop programmes to contribute its resources to the local community. It founded the 'East Surrey Learning Partnership' (ESLP), providing curriculum support to eight local primary schools. It also runs the 'Saturday Plus' programme each weekend which focuses on providing resources to prepare local primary school children for academically selective independent or grammar schools. Sixth Form pupils also volunteer to regularly host Clifton Hill School, a local primary for children with learning difficulties.

Since 2006, Caterham has supported Lerang' wa School in Tanzania.

During the COVID-19 lockdowns, Caterham operated a 'Laptops4Lockdown' scheme to direct technology to local state primary schools to help the process of virtual schooling.

=== LAE ===
In 2012, Caterham along with Eton, Brighton College and five other independent schools supported the founding of the London Academy of Excellence (LAE) in Stratford. One of LAE's school houses was therefore named 'Caterham'. LAE pupils are supported by Caterham's careers and university mentoring and CaterhamConnected network.

=== The Caterham Family of Schools ===
In 2023, Caterham founded the 'Caterham Family of Schools' which encompassed its own prep school, Caterham Prep and Copthorne Prep. In December 2024, The Hawthorns School joined and was followed by Oakhyrst Grange in July 2026. Copthorne, Hawthorns and Oakhyrst maintain their own independent management whilst benefitting from an established connection to facilitate the admission process to Caterham. The group also aims to collaborate on developing digital learning in their curriculums.

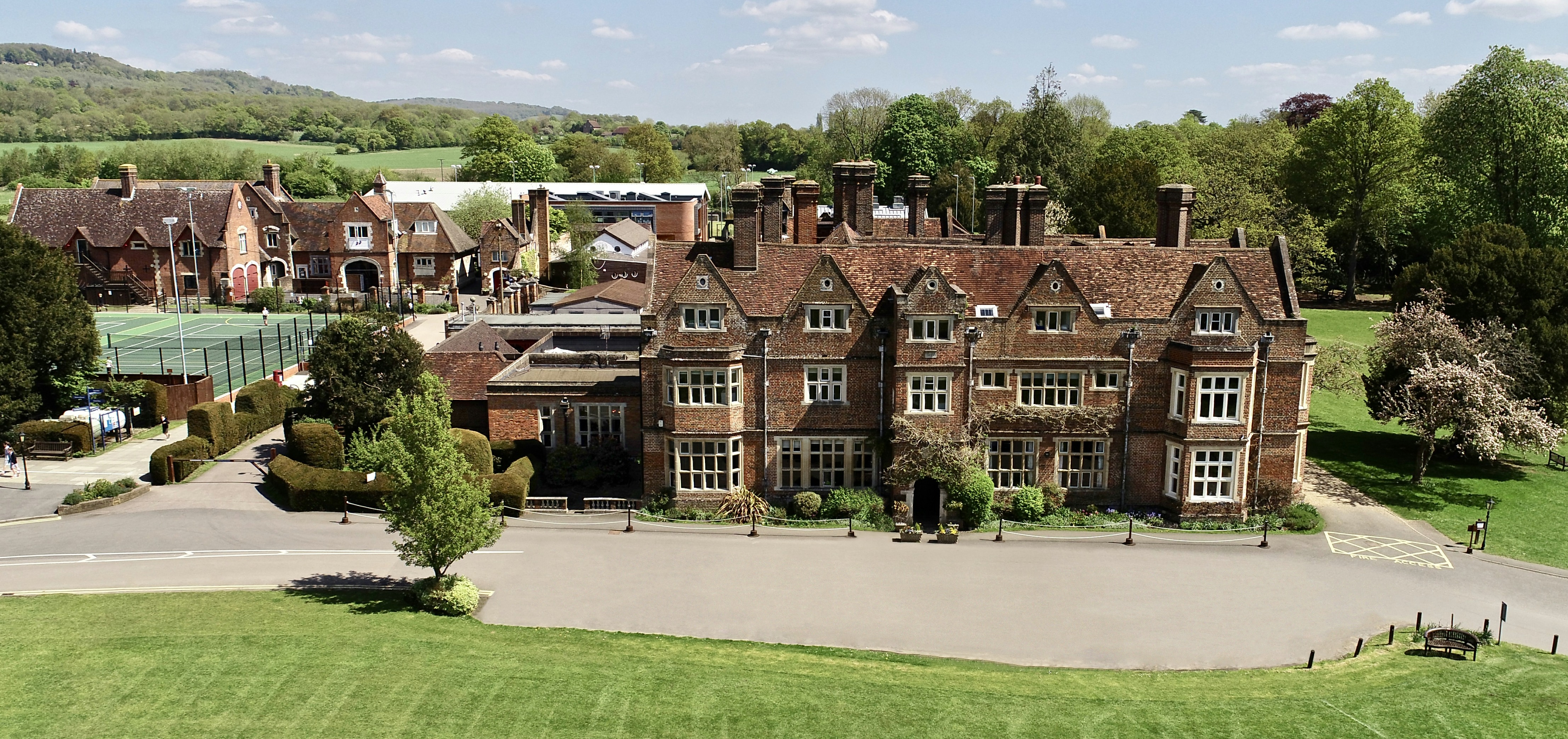
The Hawthorns School, a member of the Caterham Family of Schools. It is housed at Pendell Court.

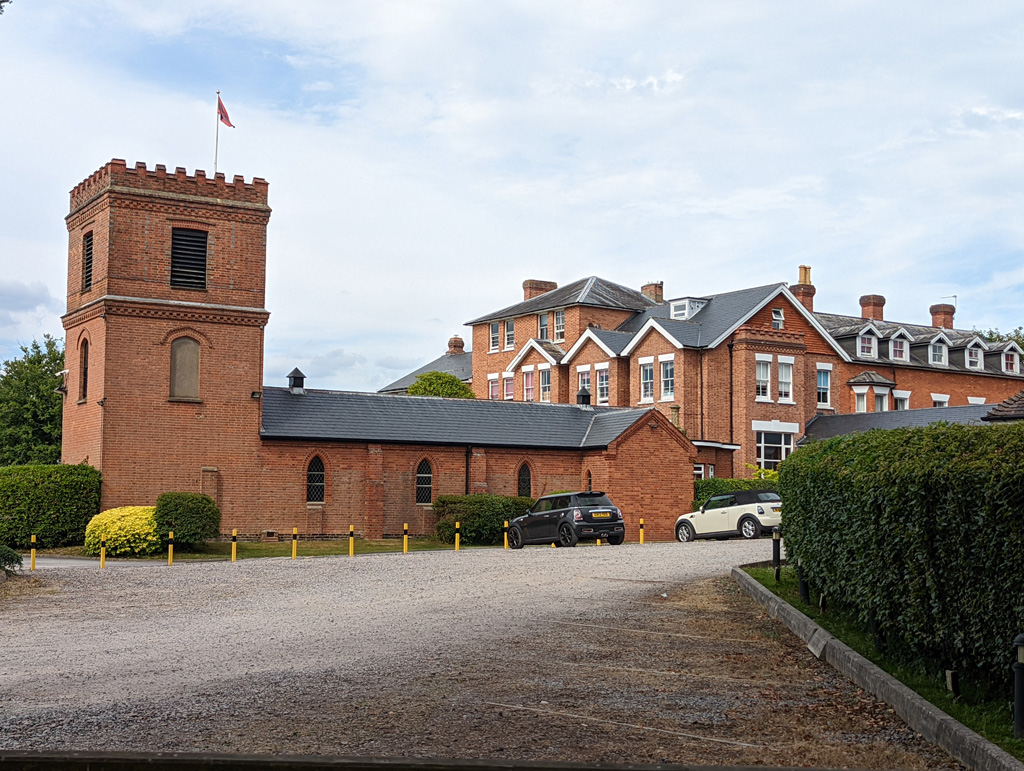
The chapel at Copthorne Prep School.

== CaterhamConnected ==
The school operates 'CaterhamConnected', its own professional and social media network for alumni, staff, parents and Sixth Form pupils from Caterham and its partnership schools. As well as the digital platform, CaterhamConnected runs 'Insight' events for the community, which take place globally.

== Notable Old Caterhamians ==
Alumni of Caterham are titled 'Old Caterhamians' (O.C.), often colloquially clipped to 'Old Cats'.

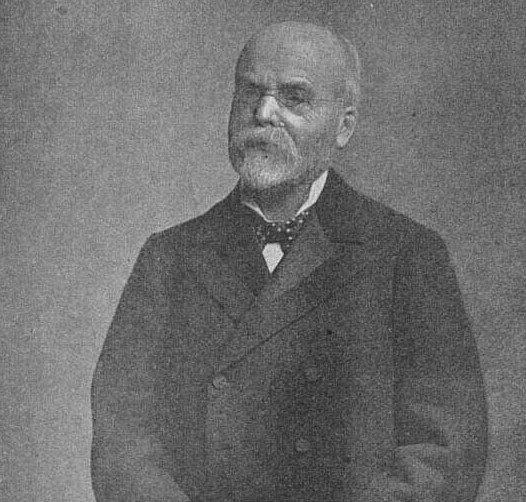
Sir John Richard Robinson (1828-1903), editor of The Daily News and member of a circle of journalists and editors at the Reform Club on Pall Mall.

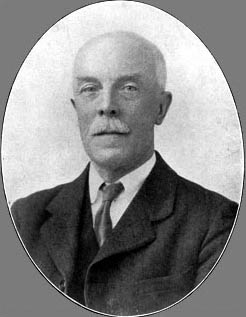
William Pickford (1861-1938), sportsman and President of the Football Association

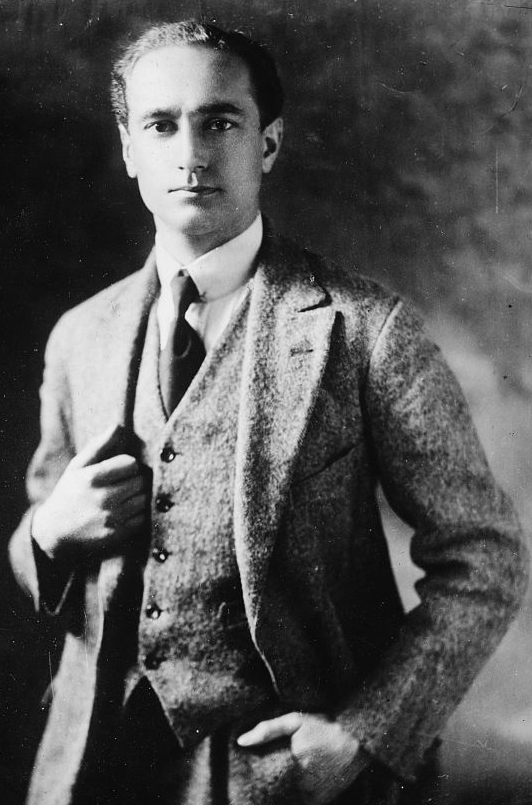
Sir Paul Dukes KBE (1889-1967), or 'The Man with a Hundred Faces'. MI6 spy posted by Mansfield Smith-Cumming in St. Petersburg during the 1905 Revolution.

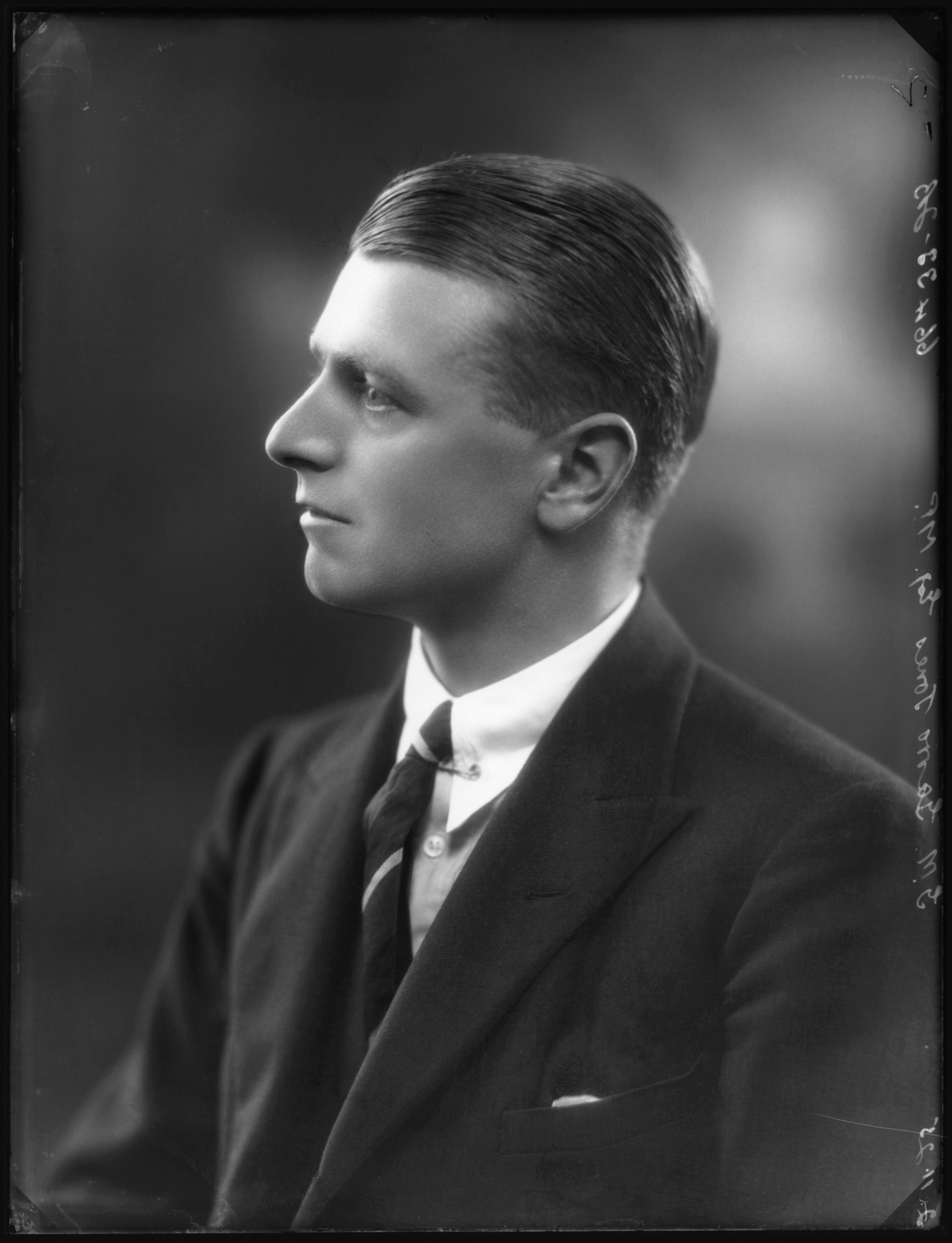
George Morgan Trefgarne, 1st Baron Trefgarne (1894 –1960).

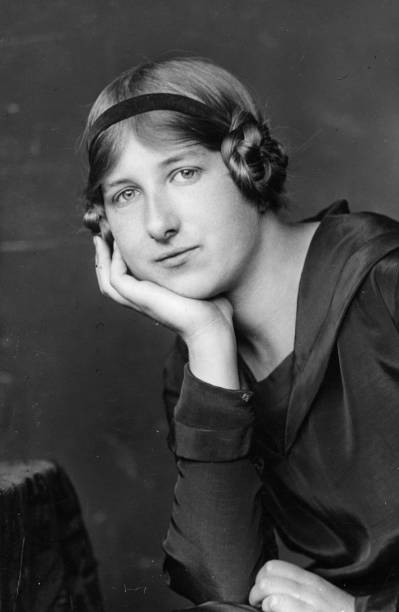
Imogen Holst CBE (1907-1984). Composer and arranger, also the daughter of Gustav Holst who wrote 'The Planets' suite.

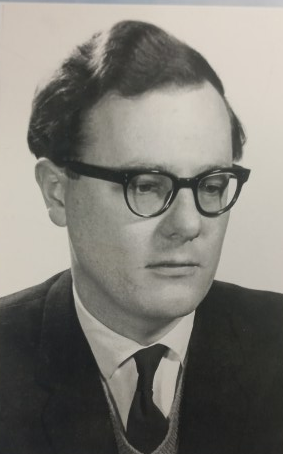
Professor Emeritus W. David McIntyre OBE (1932-2022). Pre-eminent Historian of the British Empire and Commonwealth, University of Canterbury.

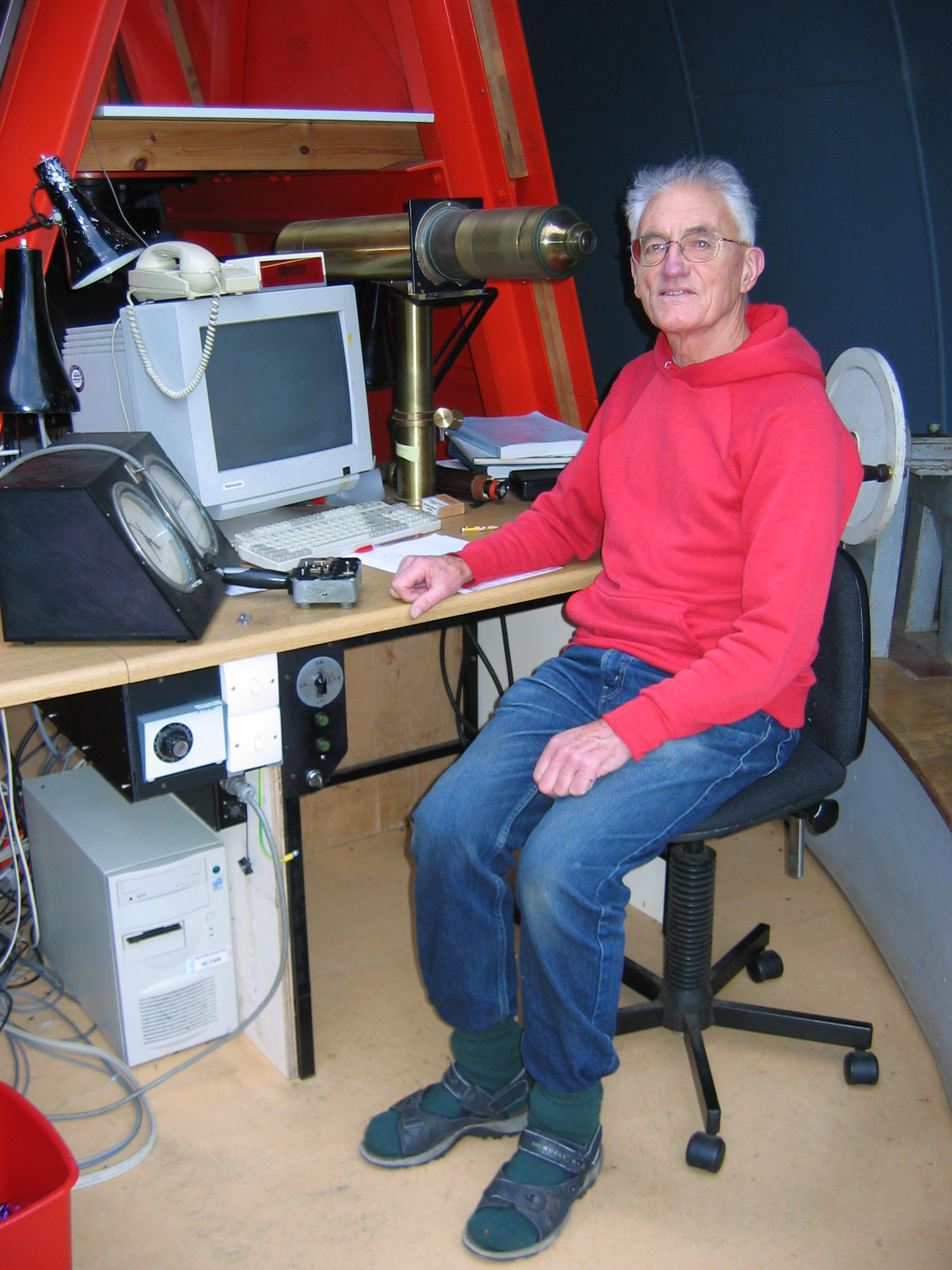
Professor Emeritus Roger Griffin (1935-2021), astronomer and research fellow at St John's College, Cambridge.

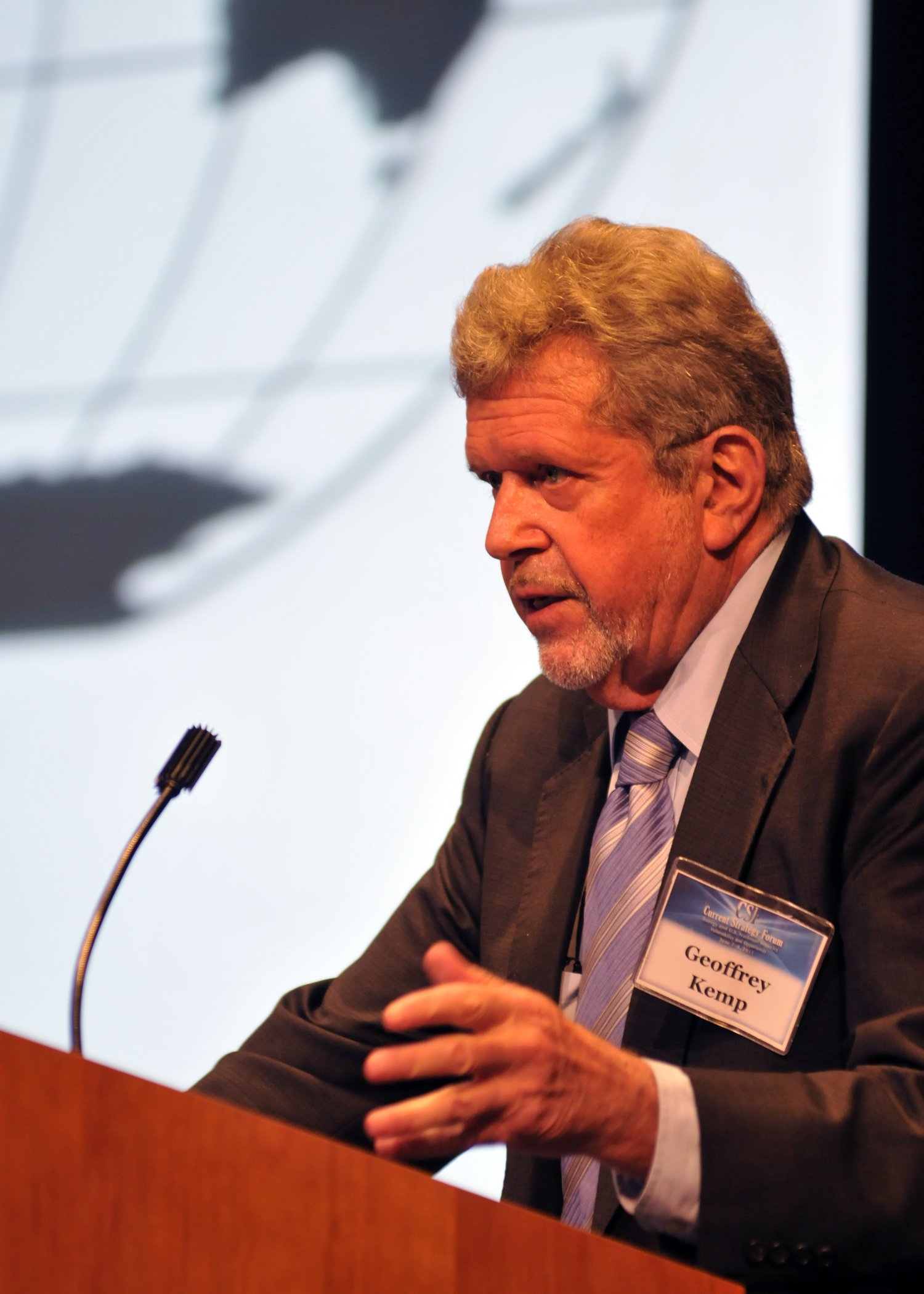
Geoffrey Kemp (born 1939), writer on international relations and former Special Assistant to Ronald Reagan.

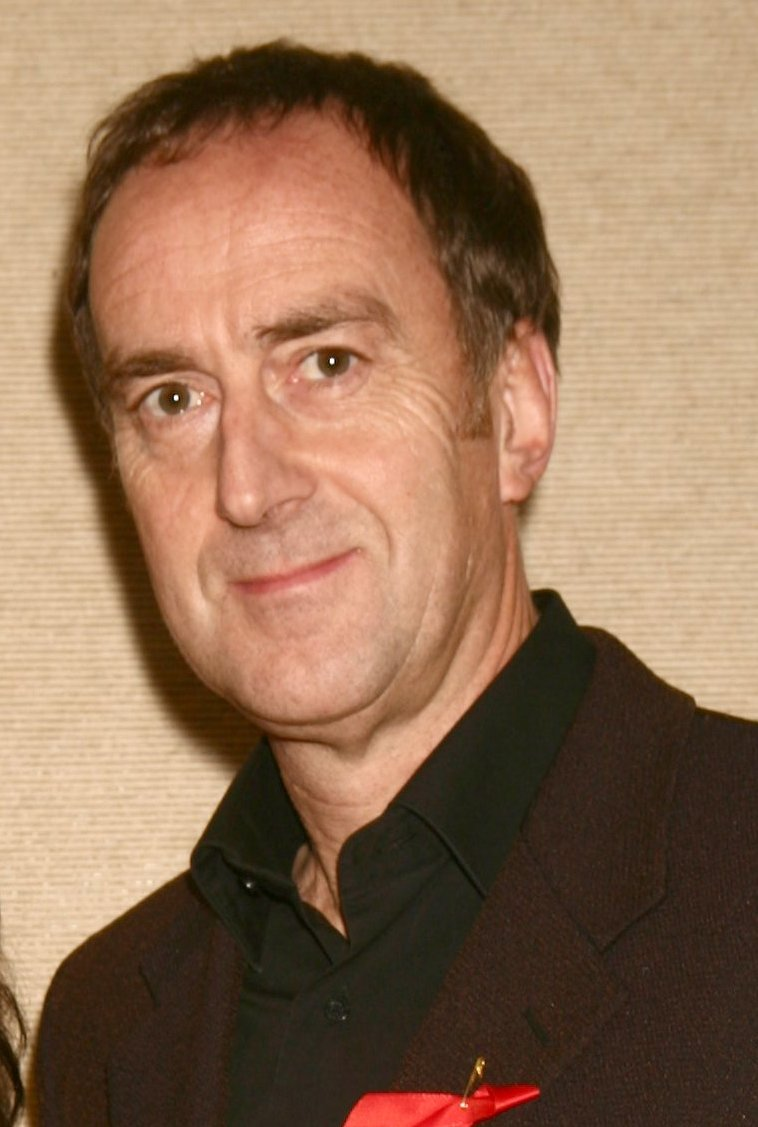
Angus Deayton (born 1956), actor, writer and comedian.

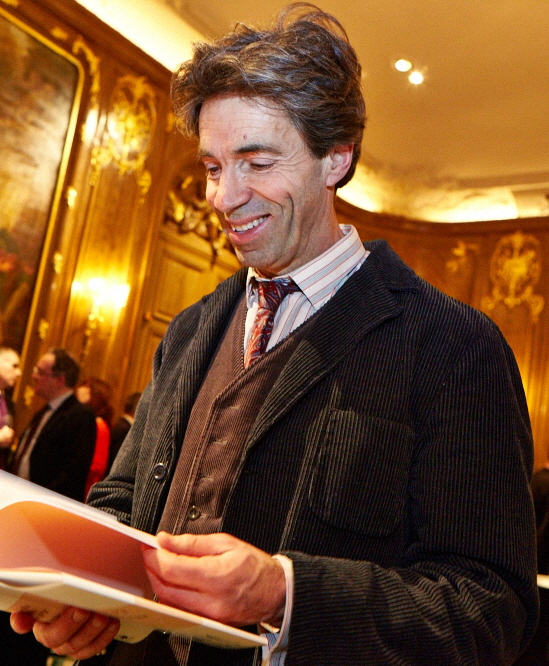
Dr. Nigel Spivey (born 1958), classicist and senior lecturer at Emmanuel College, Cambridge.

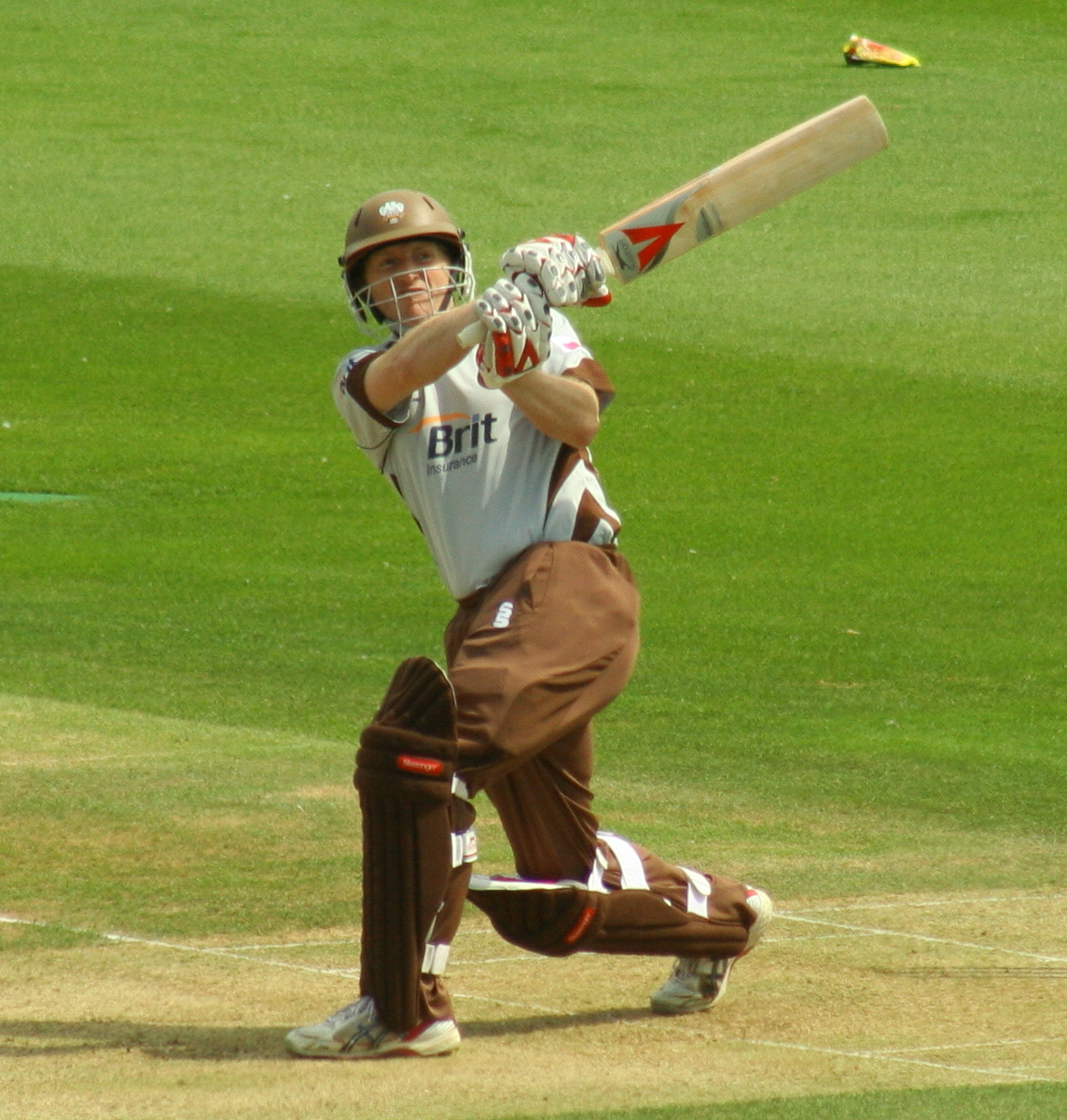
Alistair Duncan Brown (born 1970) or 'Lordy', cricketer.

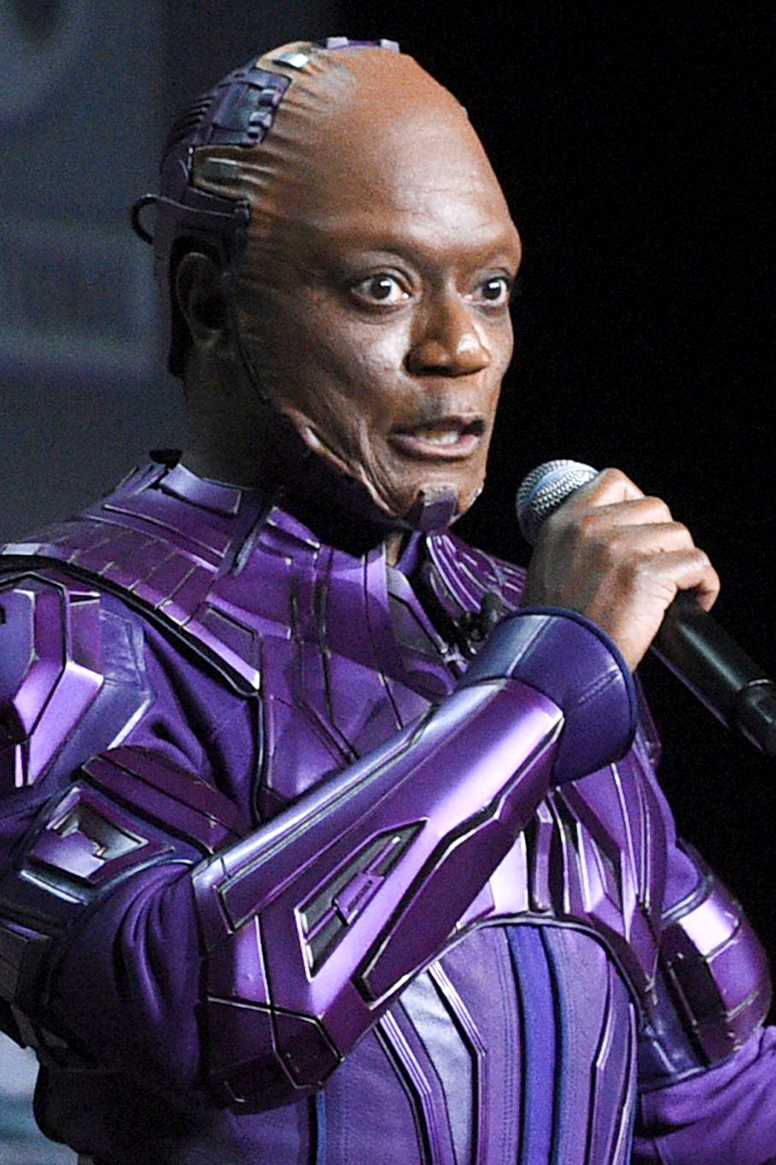
Chukwudi Iwuji (born 1975), former Head Boy and actor of the Royal Shakespeare Company and Marvel Cinematic Universe films.
- James Benning (born 1983), cricketer
- Stephen Bonarjee (1912-2001), BBC journalist
- Ali Brown (born 1970), cricketer
- Sir John Butterfill (born 1941), politician
- Ann Conolly (1917-2010), botanist
- Rosie Clarke (born 1991), athlete
- Angus Deayton (born 1956), actor and television presenter
- Cuthbert Dukes (1890–1977), pathologist and author
- Sir Paul Dukes (1889–1967), journalist and MI6 officer
- Jon Finch (1941–2012), film and television actor (1970–2005)
- George Morgan Garro-Jones (1894-1960), politician
- Jon Gilbert (born 1972), writer, bibliographer of Ian Fleming
- Roger Griffin (1935-2021), astronomer
- Chukwudi Iwuji (born 1975), actor
- Walter Monckton Keesey, O.B.E (1887–1970), architect and artist
- Geoffrey Kemp (born 1939), writer on international relations.
- Harry McInley (born 1993), cricketer
- W. David McIntyre, O.B.E (1932 - 2022), New Zealand historian and professor emeritus, University of Canterbury
- Sir Alex Harley, Master Gunner, St. James's Park, 2001–2008
- Philip Henman (1899–1986), chairman, General Lighterage Company, 1939–1969
- Imogen Holst (1907-1984), composer, and daughter of Gustav Holst
- Sir Arthur James (1916–1976), Judge of the Court of Appeal
- Edward Jones, football manager who coached Egypt
- Harold Marks (1914–2005), educator
- Denis Mitchell (1911–1990), television and radio producer
- John Morgan (1876–1955), barrister and professor of constitutional law, University College London, 1915–1941
- Harrison Osterfield (born 1996), actor
- Clement Price Thomas (1893–1973), pioneering surgeon
- Charlie Robertson (1997-), racing driver
- Pam Royds (1924-2016), publisher and children's book editor
- David Sales (born 1977), cricketer
- Eric Thiman (1900-1975), composer, conductor and organist
- Claudia Williams (born 1933), artist
