= List of people from the London Borough of Southwark =

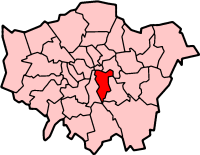
Location of the London Borough of Southwark within London

The list of people from the London Borough of Southwark includes residents who were either born or dwelt for a substantial period within the borders of this modern London borough. It does not comprise notable individuals who only studied at educational institutions in the area, such as the Camberwell School of Art and the Dulwich College. Several of the men and women listed have been honoured with blue plaques in various parts of the borough, including more than 50 commemorative plaques awarded by the Southwark Council since 2003.

In 1965, the Metropolitan Borough of Southwark, the Metropolitan Borough of Camberwell, and the Metropolitan Borough of Bermondsey were amalgamated to form the London Borough of Southwark. Located in the eastern part of South London, it is, along with the City of London, the oldest part of Greater London, with a history of civilisation that dates back to the Roman times. One of the 32 London boroughs, it constitutes several urban and suburban neighborhoods, including Bermondsey, Bankside, Camberwell, Dulwich, Peckham, Nunhead, Rotherhithe, Walworth, and The Borough, located at the southern bank of the river Thames.

The 2001 census recorded the population of Southwark to be nearly 244,866 residents, sixty-three per cent of whom are whites, sixteen per cent black African and 8 percent black Caribbean. For a decade, between 1997 and 2007, the borough's population grew at three times the rate of England as a whole. Sixty per cent of the borough's inhabitants are currently known to live in social housing.

== Notable residents ==
Key to "Notes" regarding the residents' affiliation to Southwark:

Letter	Description
B	Indicates that the resident was born in Southwark.
D	Indicates that the resident died in Southwark.

Citations in the Notes box refer to the information in the entire row.

=== Academia and research ===
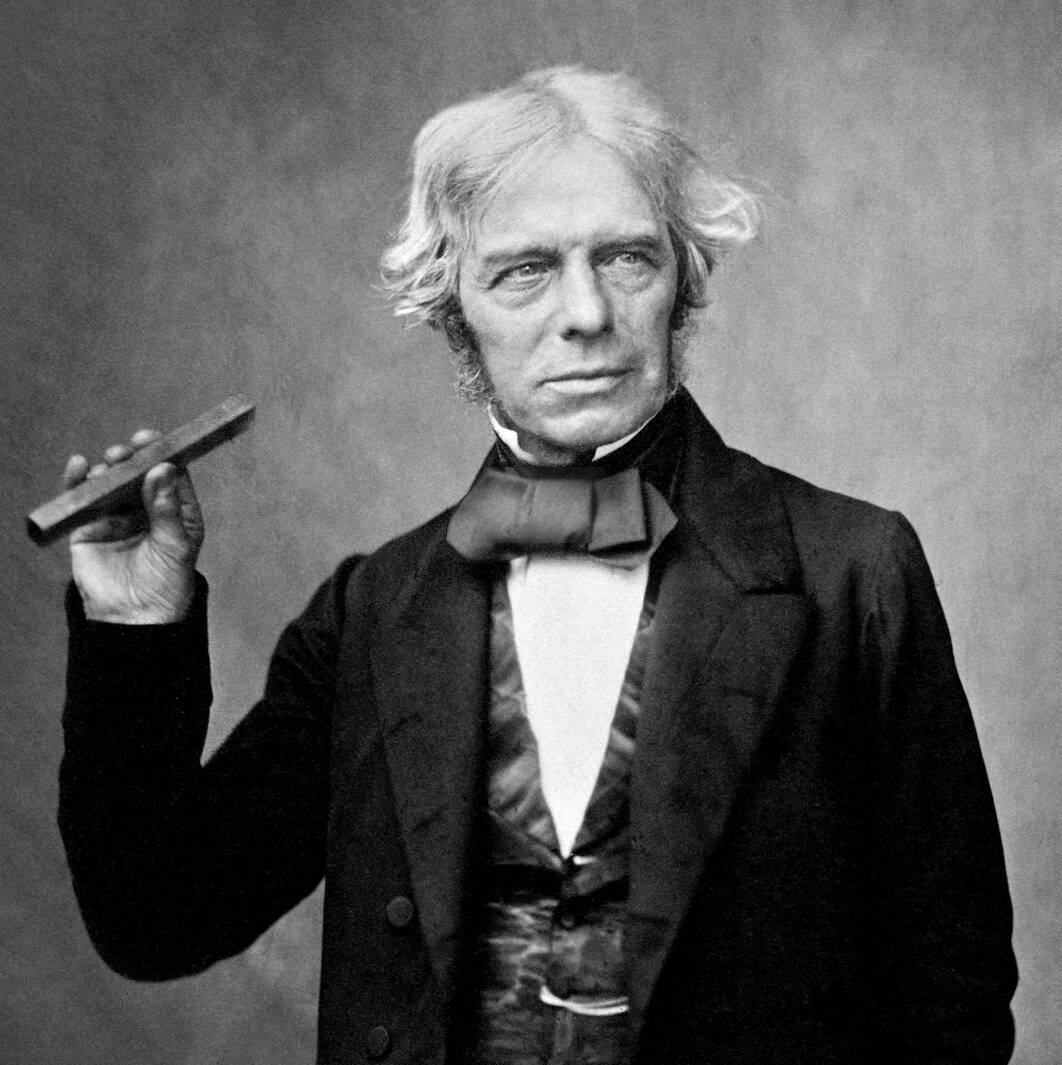
Scientist Michael Faraday

Name	Notability	District	Notes
Michael Faraday	Chemist and physicist, invented the electric motor	Newington	B
Clement le Neve Foster	Geologist and mineralogist	Camberwell	B
Benjamin Jowett	Classical scholar, served as Master of Balliol College, Oxford	Camberwell	B
Anthony James Leggett	Physicist, received the 2003 Nobel Prize in Physics for work on superfluidity	Camberwell	B
Alfred Marshall	Economist, wrote the popular textbook Principles of Economics (1890)	Bermondsey	B
Robert Recorde	Physician and mathematician, invented the "equals" sign (=) in 1557	Southwark	D
Edward Burnett Tylor	Anthropologist, affiliated with the sociocultural evolutionism	Camberwell	B

=== Arts and entertainment ===
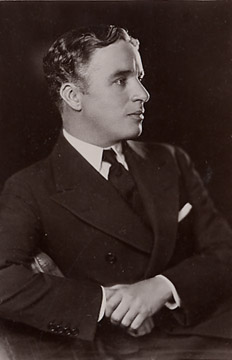
Comedy icon Charlie Chaplin

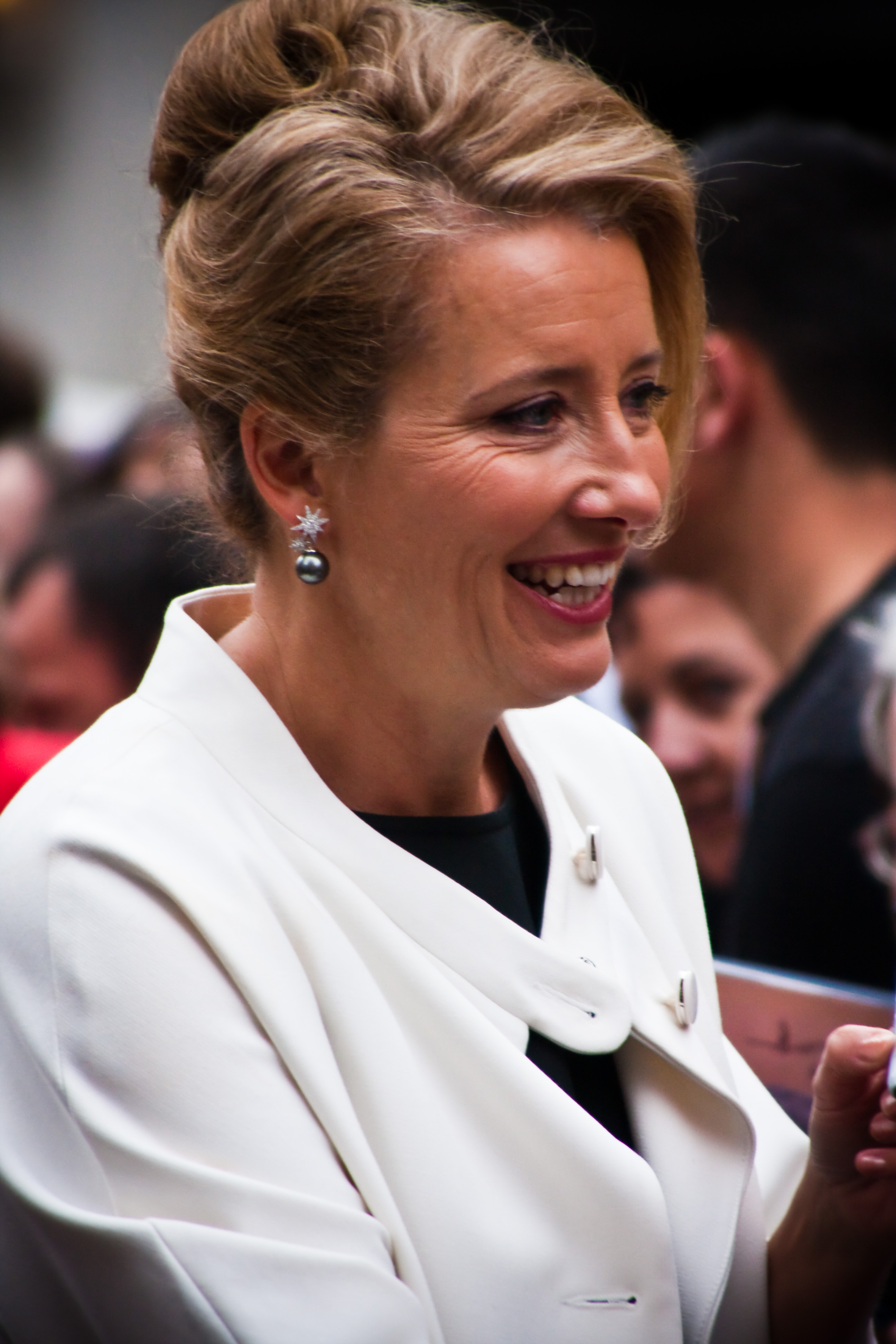
Actress Emma Thompson lived with ex-husband, Kenneth Branagh, in Camberwell

Name	Notability	District	Notes
Jenny Agutter	Film and television actress, won an Emmy Award and a BAFTA	Camberwell	
Edward Alleyn	Actor of the Elizabethan theatre, founded Dulwich College and Alleyn's School	Dulwich	
Richard Ayoade	TV and film actor, director, writer	East Dulwich	
Pete Bennett	Winner of Big Brother 7 television reality series	Camberwell	B
John Boyega	Film actor currently starring in FOX series 24: Live Another Day, alongside fellow British-American actor, Kiefer Sutherland	Peckham	
Joshua Bradley	YouTuber and member of the Sidemen	Bermondsey	
Kenneth Branagh	Actor and film director, won an Emmy Award and received an Oscar nomination	Camberwell	
Michael Caine	Actor, recipient of two Academy Awards, a BAFTA, and four Golden Globe Awards	Rotherhithe	B
Charlie Chaplin	Actor, comedian and filmmaker, recipient of two Academy Awards	Walworth	B
Pat Coombs	Character actress, worked in film, radio and television	Camberwell	B
Madeline Duggan	Character actress, known for work in the BBC soap opera EastEnders	Bermondsey	B
Jenny Eclair	Comedian, actress and novelist	Camberwell	
Chiwetel Ejiofor	Actor with special prominence on the London stage	Camberwell	
Jade Goody	Reality TV personality	Bermondsey	B
Leslie Grantham	Television actor, known for work in the BBC soap opera EastEnders	Camberwell	B
Patricia Hayes	Comedy actress, prominent for her work in television	Camberwell	B
Lynette Hemmant	Artist and illustrator	Camberwell	
Albert Houthuesen	Artist of still-lives, landscapes, seascapes, and portraits	Camberwell	
Terry Jones	Comedian, actor and filmmaker, best known as member of the Monty Python team	Camberwell	
Boris Karloff	Actor, best recognised as Frankenstein's monster in the 1931 film Frankenstein	Camberwell	B
Martin McDonagh	Playwright and film director, Academy Award winner	Camberwell	B
Ivor Moreton	Singer and pianist, known for performing in a duo with Dave Kaye	Peckham	
Erin O'Connor	Fashion model	Camberwell	
Samuel Palmer	Romantic landscape painter, etcher, printmaker and writer	Newington	B
Claude Rains	Actor and film star, winner of a Tony Award	Camberwell	B
Tim Roth	Film actor	Dulwich	B
Thomas Sangster	Film and voice actor	Southwark	
Steve Chandra Savale	Musician	Camberwell	B
Nicholas Serota	Art curator, serving as director of Tate Gallery	Camberwell	
Siouxsie Sioux	Singer-songwriter of Siouxsie and the Banshees	Southwark	B
John Stainer	Organist, composer, and professor of music at University of Oxford	Southwark	
Tommy Steele	Entertainer who brought rock music to the UK	Bermondsey	B
Emma Thompson	Actor and screenwriter, winner of Oscars, BAFTAs, an Emmy, a Golden Globe Award	Camberwell	
Mark Wallinger	Sculptor, a YBA known for the Ecce Homo (1999), and State Britain (2007) sculptures	Camberwell	
Florence Welch	Singer/songwriter (Florence + The Machine)	Camberwell	B

=== Engineering and technology ===
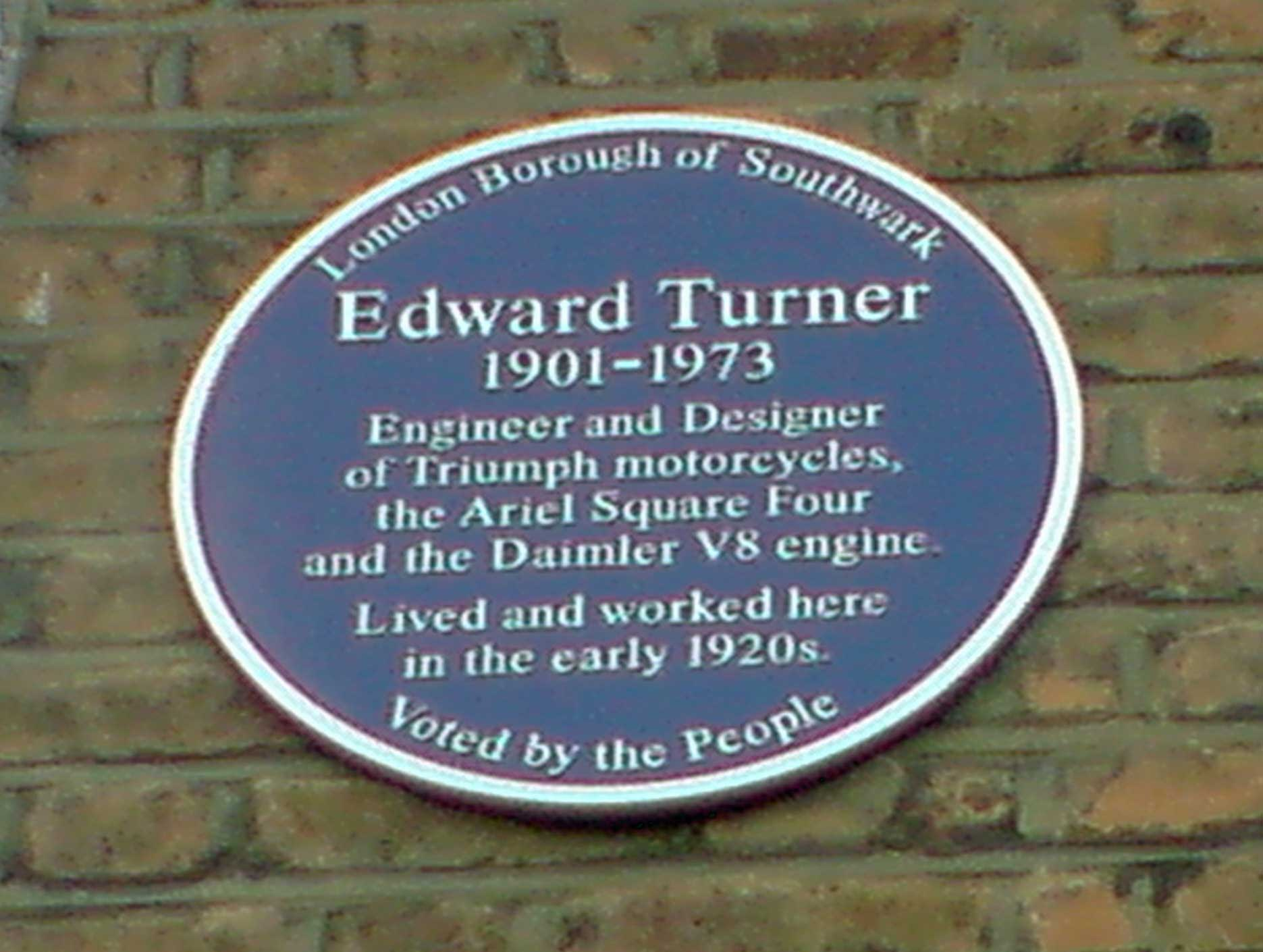
Motorcycle designer Edward Turner's Blue Plaque unveiled in 2009 at his former residence, 8 Philip Walk, Peckham, London SE15. He also ran a motorcycle shop in Peckham High Street.

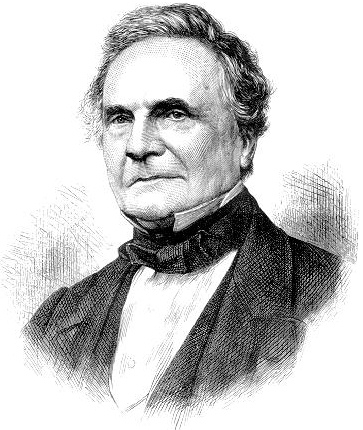
Charles Babbage, "the father of the computer"

Name	Notability	District	Notes
Charles Babbage	Victorian mathematician, inventor of the first mechanical computing machine	Walworth	B
Isambard Kingdom Brunel	Victorian engineer, designed Great Western Railway and SS Great Britain	Rotherhithe	
Marc Isambard Brunel	Engineer, known for designing the construction of the Thames Tunnel	Rotherhithe	
Edward Turner	Engineer, designed Ariel and Triumph motorcycles and Daimler cars	Camberwell	B

=== Journalism and media ===
Name	Notability	District	Notes
Jeremy Bowen	Reporter and television presenter, best known as a war correspondent for the BBC	Camberwell	
Peter Preston	Editor of The Guardian (1975–1995) and a chairman of International Press Institute (1995–97)	Camberwell	
Zoe Williams	Reporter and columnist for The Guardian and the New Statesman	Camberwell	

=== Literature ===
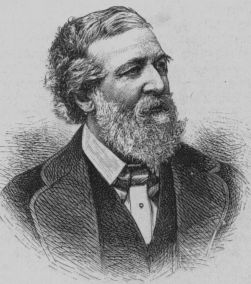
Poet Robert Browning

Name	Notability	District	Notes
Enid Blyton	Children's author, with popular work like the Famous Five and Secret Seven series	East Dulwich	B
Robert Browning	Victorian poet and playwright, known for mastery of dramatic verse	Camberwell	B
Camilla Dufour Crosland	Victorian poet, novelist and writer on social and historical subjects, died in East Dulwich	East Dulwich	B
Charles Dickens	Victorian novelist, journalist and social campaigner	Southwark	
Harry Buxton Forman	Victorian bibliographer, editor, Shelley scholar	Camberwell	
Philip Massinger	Playwright of works such as A New Way to Pay Old Debts and The Roman Actor	Southwark	D
John Ruskin	Art critic, social theorist, painter and writer	Denmark Hill	
Hester Thrale	Diarist and author, whose writings illuminate life in 18th-century England	Southwark	
Mary Wollstonecraft	Author and feminist, known for writing A Vindication of the Rights of Woman (1792)	Newington Butts	

=== Politics and government ===
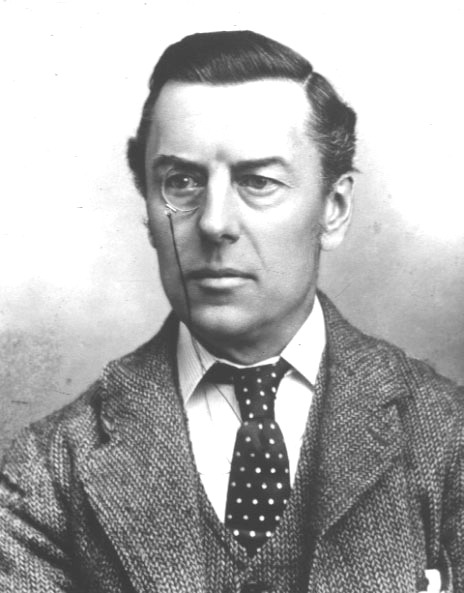
Politician Joseph Chamberlain

Name	Notability	District	Notes
Lord Eric Avebury	Liberal Member of Parliament, 1962–70; Liberal Democrat Representative peer, 1999-	Camberwell	
Joseph Chamberlain	Liberal and Liberal Unionist politician, entrepreneur and imperial statesman	Camberwell	B
Harriet Harman	Labour Member of parliament, 1983-; Leader of the House of Commons, 2007–	Dulwich	
Simon Hughes	Liberal Democrat Member of Parliament (1983-) and party President (2004-)	Bermondsey	
Jack Jones	General Secretary of the Transport and General Workers' Union, 1968–77	Denmark Hill	
Sir Timothy Laurence	Naval officer, Equerry to Queen Elizabeth (1986–89), and husband of Princess Anne	Camberwell	B
Henry Thrale	Anchor Brewery heir, Member of Parliament (1765–80), Sheriff of the City of London	Southwark	
Larry Whitty	Labour politician; General Secretary of the Labour Party (1985–94)	Camberwell	

=== Religion ===
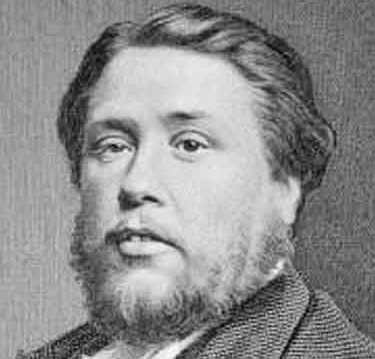
Preacher C.H. Spurgeon

Name	Notability	District	Notes
Hester Biddle	Quaker pamphleteer, preacher and traveller	Bermondsey	D
Edmund Bonner	Bishop of London, known for persecuting heretics in Queen Mary I's Catholic rule	Southwark	D
John Harvard	English clergyman, first benefactor to College, 1639 named Harvard University in his honour	Southwark	B
Francis Pott	English clergyman and hymnwriter	Southwark	
Mother Mary Potter	Founder of the Little Company of Mary in 1877. On 8 February 1988, Pope John Paul II proclaimed her Venerable.	Bermondsey	B
Charles Spurgeon	Reformed Baptist preacher and eponym for Spurgeon's College	Elephant and Castle	

=== Sports ===
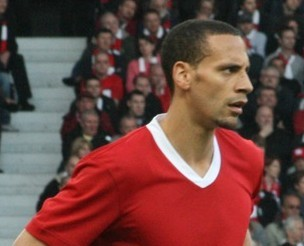
Rio Ferdinand, former captain of England

Name	Notability	District	Notes
Bobby Abel	Cricketer (1881–1904), played as an opening batsman for the England cricket team	Rotherhithe	B
John Bostock	Footballer, plays as a midfielder for OH Leuven	Camberwell	B
Rio Ferdinand	Former footballer, played as a centre-back most notably for Manchester United; was also a former captain of England; currently a pundit for BT Sport	Peckham	B
Duncan Goodhew	Swimmer, winner of gold and bronze medals at the 1980 Summer Olympics	Camberwell	
David Haye	Boxer, former WBA heavyweight champion, former unified world cruiserweight champion and former European cruiserweight champion	Bermondsey	
John Keene	Cricketer (1897–1907), played as a bowler for Surrey, Worcestershire, and Scotland		B
Nosher Powell	Boxer and actor	Camberwell	B
Martin Ruane	Wrestler, known as "Giant Haystacks" and a European Union Heavyweight Champion	Camberwell	B
Kenny Sansom	Footballer, played as a left back for Arsenal and England	Camberwell	B

== See also ==
- List of people from London
