= Harrovian =

Harrovian may refer to:

- a member of Harrow School, Harrow, London, England, UK; an independent school
- an inhabitant of the town of Harrow, London, England, UK
- an adjective for the London Borough of Harrow, England, UK
- pertaining to the Harrow London Borough Council, England, UK
- pertaining to Harrow High School, Borough of Harrow, London, England, UK
- an adjective for Harrow College, Borough of Harrow, London, England, UK
- The Harrovian, school newspaper for Harrow School, Harrow, London, England, UK

== See also ==
- List of Old Harrovians, Harrow School, Harrow, London, England, UK
- List of people from Harrow, Borough of Harrow, London, England, UK
- Harrow (disambiguation)
