= List of people from the London Borough of Harrow =

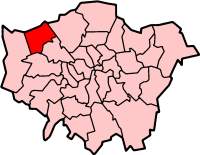
Location of the London Borough of Harrow within Greater London

Among those who were born in the London Borough of Harrow, or have dwelt within the borders of the modern borough are (alphabetical order, within category):

== Notable residents ==
=== Academia and research ===
- Peter Ackroyd, Biblical scholar, brought up in Harrow
- Sir Patrick Moore, astronomer, born in Pinner
- Malcolm Nokes MC, CENTO nuclear scientist, research chemist and teacher (see also below Sport)
- Keith Riglin, bishop and theologian, brought up and educated in Harrow
- Edward Skoyles, researcher and quantity surveyor, born in Harrow

=== Arts and entertainment ===
- Peter André, singer and entertainer, born in Harrow
- Jai Paul, singer and record producer, born in Harrow
- George Arthurs, songwriter and author, lived and died in Harrow
- David Baddiel, comedian and TV personality, lives in Hatch End
- Ronnie Barker, comedian, lived in Pinner before moving to Oxfordshire
- James Blunt, singer, educated at Harrow School
- Yama Buddha, rapper and writer, lived and died in Harrow
- Lord Byron, poet, educated at Harrow School (1801–1805)
- Todd Carty, actor, known for roles in Grange Hill and EastEnders, lived in South Harrow
- Rebecca Clarke, composer and violist, was born and grew up in Harrow
- Kenneth Connor, Carry On actor, lived in South Harrow
- Brian Cookman, musician, artist and tai chi expert
- Ambrose Coviello (1887–1950), pianist and teacher, lived at 84 Lowlands Road
- Barry Cryer, comedy writer and author, lived in Pinner
- Benedict Cumberbatch, actor, educated at Harrow School
- Leslie Davenport, artist and teacher
- Alan Dedicoat, announcer of The National Lottery Draws, lives in Harrow
- Alan Donohoe, singer of The Rakes
- Ian Dury, musician, of Ian Dury and the Blockheads, born in Harrow Weald
- Vernon Elliott (1912–1996), bassoonist, conductor and composer, lived at 3, Maxted Park from the mid-1950s
- Loick Essien, singer
- Tom Fletcher, singer/guitarist with McFly, born in Harrow
- Carrie Hope Fletcher, actress, singer, author and Vlogger, born in Harrow
- Michelle Gayle, actress and singer, lives in Harrow-on-the-Hill
- Sir William Gilbert, of Gilbert & Sullivan fame, lived and died at Grim's Dyke, Harrow Weald
- Roger Glover, bassist with Deep Purple and musician Harvey Shield, Harrow County School alumni.
- Nikki Grahame, best known as a contestant at Big Brother, lived in Stanmore at the time of her death
- Honey G, a finalist on the thirteenth series of The X Factor
- Blake Harrison, actor, lives in Stanmore
- Gavin Harrison, musician, drummer of Porcupine Tree and King Crimson
- Billy Idol, singer, born in Stanmore
- Sir Elton John, musician, brought up on Pinner Hill Road
- David Jones, artist and poet, lived and died in Harrow
- Martin Kemp, part of Spandau Ballet, lived in Pinner whilst working on EastEnders
- Mark Lamarr, TV personality, moved from Swindon to Harrow in his late teens
- Robin Leach, Harrow born and raised American television personality, former entertainment reporter for Entertainment Tonight, and former host of the syndicated Lifestyles of the Rich and Famous program
- Simon Le Bon, lead singer of Duran Duran, brought up in North Harrow
- Matt Lucas, comedian, born in Stanmore
- Royston Maldoom, choreographer, born in Harrow
- Peter Melvin, architect
- Sir Roger Moore, actor who played Simon Templar and James Bond, lived in Gordon Avenue, Stanmore
- Kate Nash, singer and musician
- Dev Patel, actor, stars in Skins and Slumdog Millionaire
- Geoffrey Perkins, TV producer, attended Harrow County School and lived in Barn Crescent, Stanmore
- Nina Rajarani, founder of Srishti Dance and winner of The Place Prize in 2006
- Johnny Robinson, finalist on the eighth series of The X Factor
- Pam St. Clement, actress who played Pat Evans in EastEnders, born in Harrow-on-the-Hill
- Jay Sean, singer-songwriter, raised in North Harrow
- Aiden Shaw, model, author and actor, born in Harrow
- Jamie Stewart, musician and former bassist for The Cult
- Sir David Suchet, actor, lived in Pinner
- Melissa Suffield, actress who played Lucy Beale in EastEnders
- Screaming Lord Sutch, musician and leader of The Monster Raving Loony Party, lived and died in Harrow
- Dave Vanian, lead singer of The Damned
- Mike Vernon, record producer of Blues Breakers with Eric Clapton, born in Harrow
- John Wardley, concept designer and developer of theme parks, born in Harrow
- Molly Weir, Scottish comedy actress, lived in Pinner until her death
- Dame Vivienne Westwood, celebrated fashion designer, moved to Harrow aged 17
- Dame Barbara Windsor, known for roles in the Carry On films and Eastenders, lived in Stanmore
- Richard Wright, keyboard player and songwriter with Pink Floyd, spent early years in Hatch End

=== Business and finance ===
- Agha Hasan Abedi, founder of BCCI, at one point the sixth largest bank in the world

=== Engineering and technology ===
- Gavin Fisher, engineer, former chief designer for the Williams F1 team

=== Journalism and the media ===
- George Alagiah, BBC newsreader and journalist, lived in Harrow Weald
- Clive Anderson, lawyer and chat show host, was schooled at then-Harrow County Grammar School
- Mrs Beeton, first celebrity cook, lived on Uxbridge Road, Hatch End
- Kay Burley, Sky News presenter and journalist, lives at Harrow-on-the-Hill
- Joe Colquhoun, comics writer, including Charley's War
- Daniel Finkelstein (now Lord Finkelstein), failed Conservative Parliamentary candidate and comment editor of The Times, lives in Pinner
- Liam Halligan, financial journalist and TV presenter, alumnus now governor of John Lyon School
- Mehdi Hasan, broadcaster and writer, grew up in Harrow
- Bob Holness, television presenter, lived in Pinner
- Claire Rayner, journalist and agony aunt, lived at Harrow on the Hill
- Heath Robinson, cartoonist, lived in Pinner

=== Literature ===
- Lord Byron, poet
- Harriett Drury (1824–1912), novelist, poet and writer of boys' stories, was born in Harrow
- Karis Kelly, playwright and screenwriter, grew up in Harrow
- Michael Rosen, Children's Laureate 2007–09, born in Harrow-on-the-Hill and lived in Pinner 1946–62

=== Military ===
- Douglas Arthur Davies, World War I flying ace with No. 150 Squadron RAF
- Charles Garforth, 15th Hussars, Victoria Cross recipient, educated in Harrow
- Theodore Hardy, Army Chaplains' Department, Victoria Cross recipient, educated in Hatch End
- Leefe Robinson, Victoria Cross recipient, Royal Flying Corps, buried in All Saints' Churchyard, Harrow Weald graveyard at Brockhurst Corner opposite a restaurant bearing his name
- Joseph Wong, educated in Harrow

=== Politics and government ===
- Diane Abbott, politician, grew up in Harrow
- Sir Winston Churchill, British Prime Minister, attended Harrow School beginning 1888
- Susan Hall, politician, local councillor and Member of the London Assembly
- Sir Oswald Mosley, local MP in the 1920s
- Jawaharlal Nehru, first Prime Minister of India, educated at Harrow School
- Horatia Nelson, illegitimate daughter of Admiral Lord Nelson; lived, died and is buried in Pinner
- Robert Peel, British Prime Minister, studied at Harrow School
- Marmaduke Pickthall, convert to Islam, notable for translating the Qur'an into English
- Michael Portillo, politician and Cabinet minister, attended Harrow County Grammar School
- Merlyn Rees (later Lord Merlyn-Rees), Welsh politician, taught at Harrow Weald GS and lived in Hatch End
- "Lord Sutch", eccentric politician and musician, lived and died in South Harrow (see also Arts, above)

=== Sport ===
- Sir Roger Bannister, athlete and neurologist
- Syd Brown, Middlesex County Champions cricketer, alumnus of Headstone County School
- Byron Bubb, international footballer
- Ciaran Clark, Aston Villa F.C. defender
- Angus Fraser, Middlesex and England cricketer
- Ben Gill, professional footballer for Cheltenham Town F.C.
- Vinnie Jones, footballer and actor, played for Wealdstone F.C. 1984-88 and Wales
- David Kemp, professional footballer and Stoke City F.C. manager
- Adrian Mariappa, Reading F.C. defender
- Bevis Mugabi, Motherwell F.C. defender
- Capt. M.C. Nokes MC, Olympic & Commonwealth medallist, hammer, twice; Chairman of the AAA
- John-Joe O'Toole, Colchester United footballer
- Stuart Pearce, footballer, played for Wealdstone F.C. 1978-83 and England, manager (2012)
- Mark Ramprakash, England cricketer now President of Middlesex CCC, lives in Hatch End
- Anton Robinson, footballer for Bournemouth F.C., from Rayners Lane
- Alexis Sánchez, Chilean footballer, lived in Stanmore when playing for Arsenal F.C.
- Simisola Shittu, Harrow-born Canadian basketball player, now with Limoges CSP
- Becky Spencer, football goalkeeper for the Jamaica national team
- Theo Walcott, England footballer, born in Stanmore
- Elliott Ward, A.F.C. Bournemouth defender

== See also ==
- Harrovian (disambiguation)
