= List of people from the London Borough of Hounslow =

Among those who were born in the London Borough of Hounslow, or have live/lived within the borders of the modern borough are (alphabetical order):

== A ==
- Marcus Akin – reality TV personality, karate practitioner, actor and writer, lives in Brentford
- Cecil Aldin – artist and illustrator, lived in Chiswick from 1894 to 1904
- Sone Aluko – professional footballer, born in Hounslow
- Mathangi "Maya" Arulpragasam (known as M.I.A.) – British rapper, recording artist, songwriter, painter and director, born in Hounslow
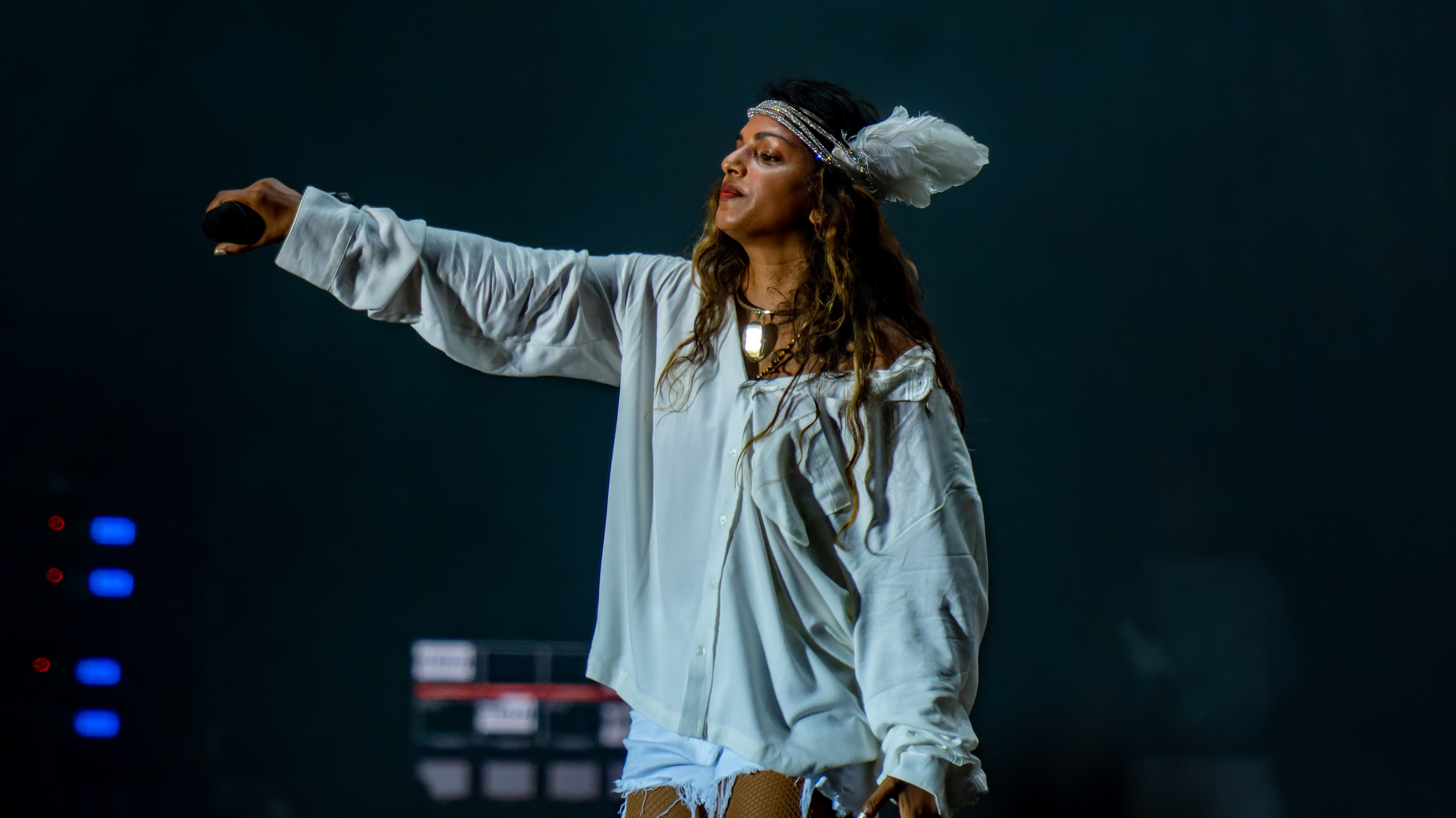
  Rapper M.I.A.
- Ben Ash (Two Inch Punch) – songwriter and producer for names such as Tory Lanez, Sam Smith, Ty Dollar $ign; born in Brentford
- David Attenborough – TV wildlife broadcaster, born in Isleworth
- Sarah Ayton – Olympic gold medallist in the Yngling sailing class, 2004 and 2008; lived in Ashford

== B ==
- Sir Joseph Banks – botanist, lived and died at Spring Grove in Isleworth, buried in Heston churchyard
- Nicholas Barbon – economist and financial speculator, died at Osterley Park House
- John Bardon - actor, born Brentford, 1939
- Ellie Beaven – actress, grew up in Isleworth
- Kate Beckinsale – actress, born in Chiswick
- Rolan Bell – actor, born in Chiswick
- Jack Beresford – Olympic rower, lived in Chiswick from 1903 to 1940
- Alonza Bevan – bassist of Kula Shaker, born in Hounslow
- Sanjeev Bhaskar – actor, comedian and television personality; grew up in Hounslow
- Walter R. Booth (1882–1938) – creator of the first British animated cartoon film, The Hand of the Artist, lived in Isleworth
- Jack Buckland – composer and recording artist, from the Chiswick area

== C ==
- Jimmy Carr – comedian, born in Hounslow
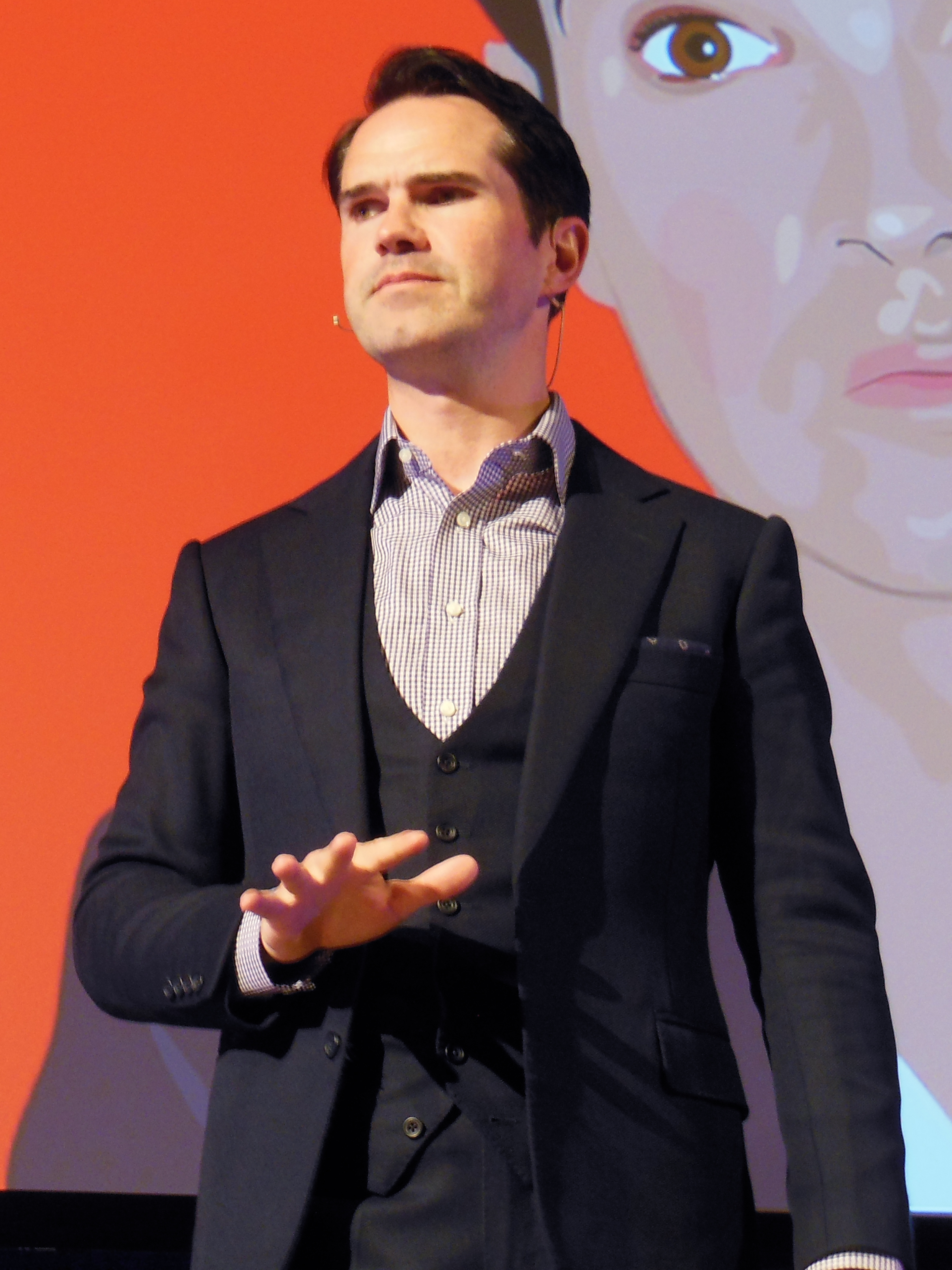
  Comedian Jimmy Carr

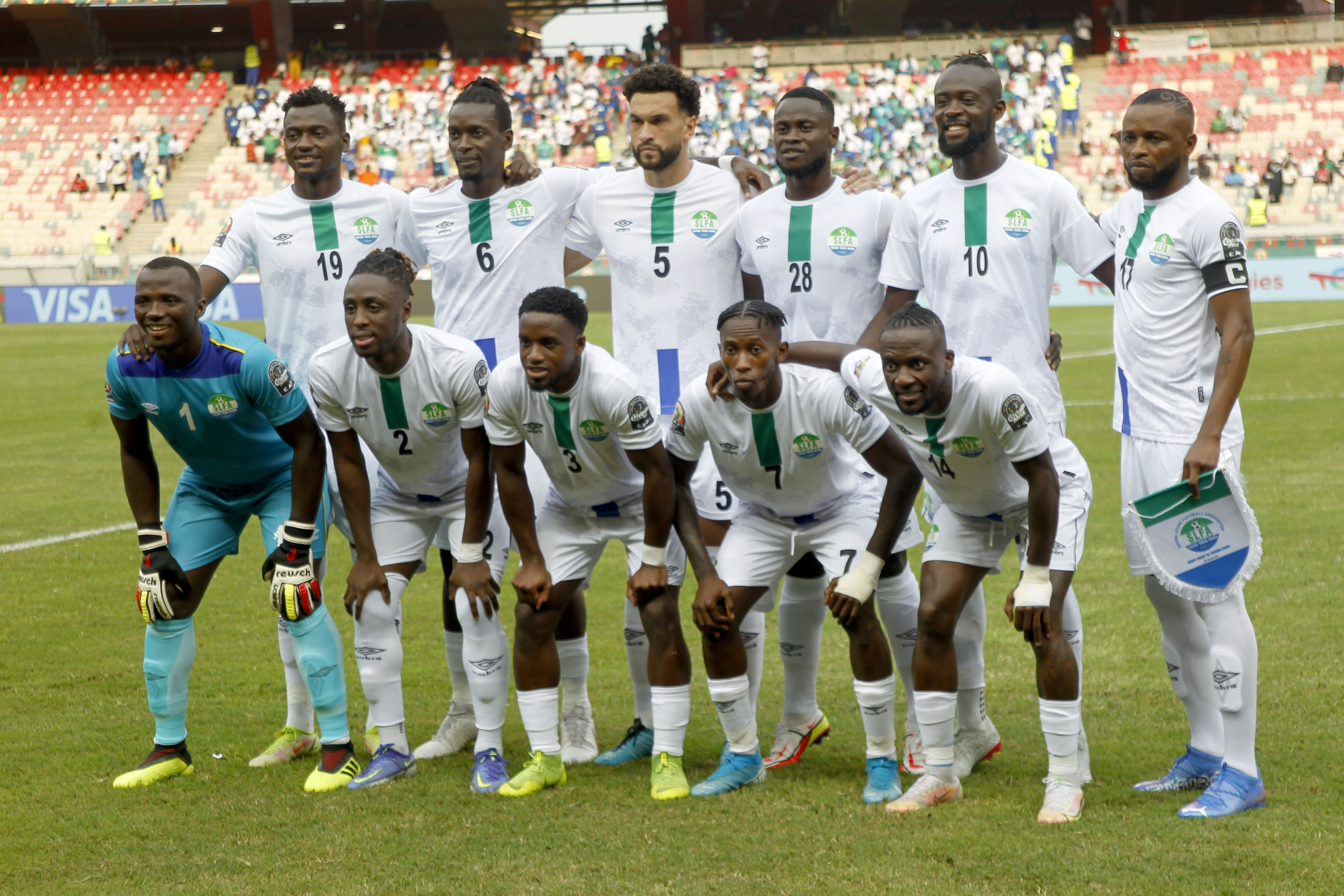
Steven Caulker (middle), footballer for International team Sierra Leone as well as Tottenham Hotspur

- Steven Caulker – professional footballer, grew up in Feltham
- Benjamin Cook – YouTube creator, filmmaker and journalist, born in Isleworth
- Dave Cousins – singer and songwriter of The Strawbs, born and grew up in Chiswick
- Thomas Chaloner – introduced alum mining to England
- Anthony Charles – professional footballer, born in Isleworth
- Asim Chaudhry – comedian, writer and director, born in Hounslow
- Keith Chegwin – presenter – lived in Linkfield Road, Isleworth with his wife at the time, Maggie Philbin, Tomorrow's World presenter
- Phil Collins – singer, musician and actor
- Amelia Clarkson – actress
- E. E. Cowper (1859–1933) – English novelist, lived in Chiswick
- Cyril Cusack – actor, lived in Hounslow

== D ==
- Jaz Deol – actor
- Alec Dickson – founder of Voluntary Service Overseas
- Ruel Vincent van Dijk – British-Australian singer, born in Isleworth
- Michael Dobson – professional footballer, born in Isleworth

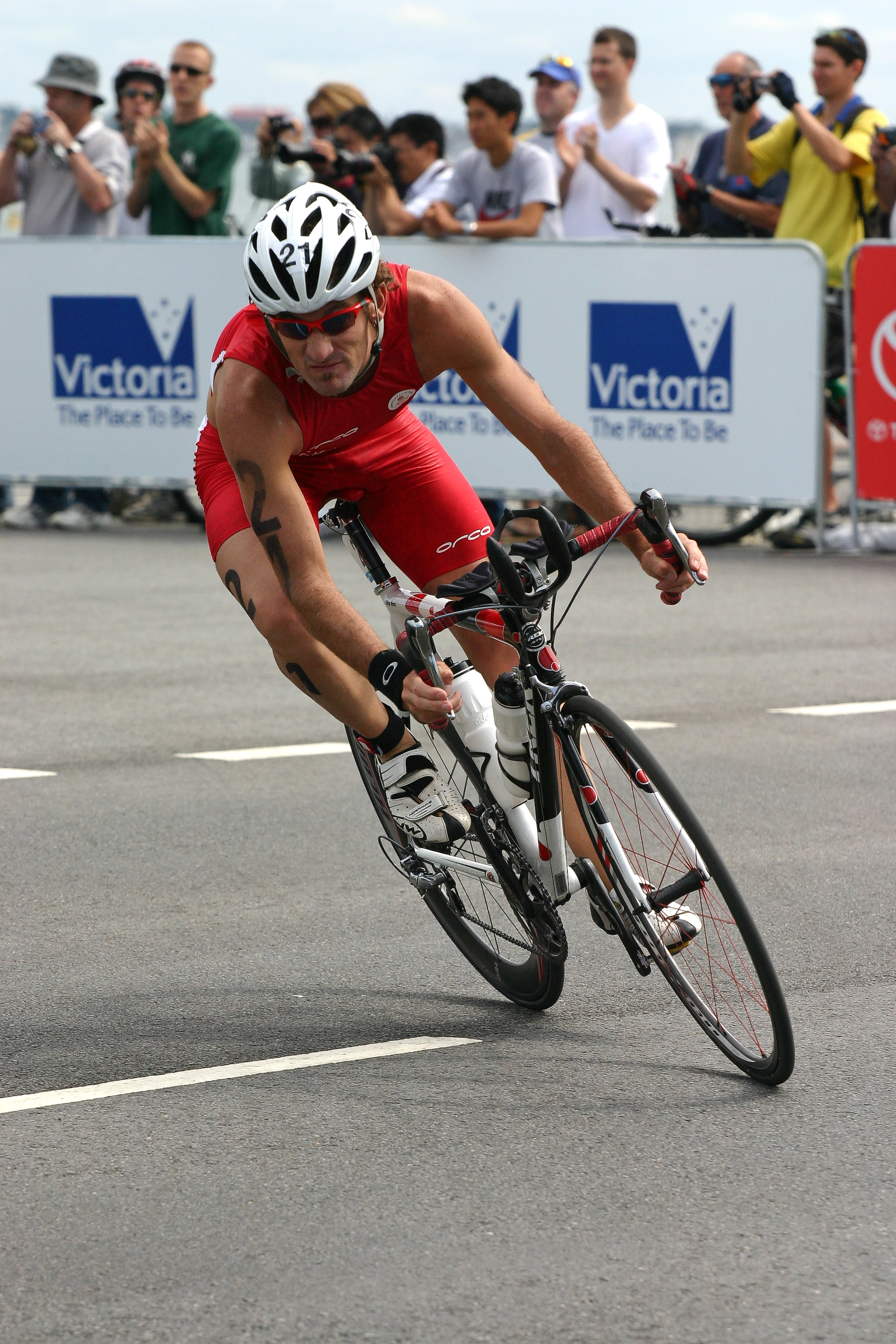
Olympian Tim Don, Commonwealth Medalist and Triathlon World Champion

- Tim Don – GB triathlete, born and grew up in Hounslow
- MF Doom — British-American rapper, born in Hounslow
- Lonnie Donegan – singer, lived in Chiswick
- Yvonne Drewry – artist
- Anne-Marie Duff – actress, born in Chiswick

== E ==
- Merrick Elderton (1884–1939) – English cricketer and educator
- John Entwistle – bassist of legendary rock band The Who
- Robert Evans – politician, Labour MEP 1994–2009; lived in Ashford
- Sophie Ellis-Bextor – singer, born in Hounslow

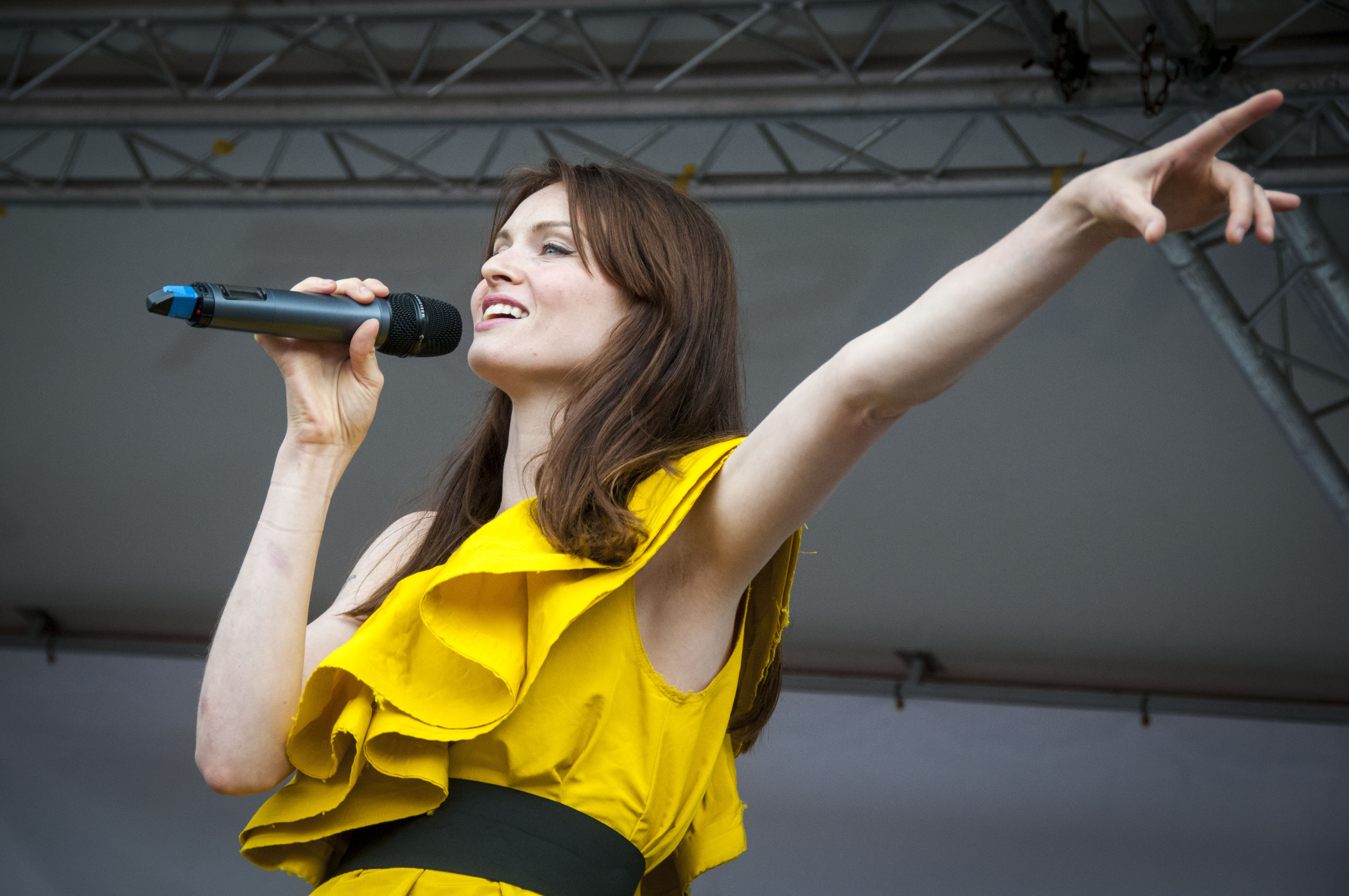
Singer Sophie Ellis-Bextor

- Evan Edinger, YouTuber – resident of Hounslow until 2021

== F ==
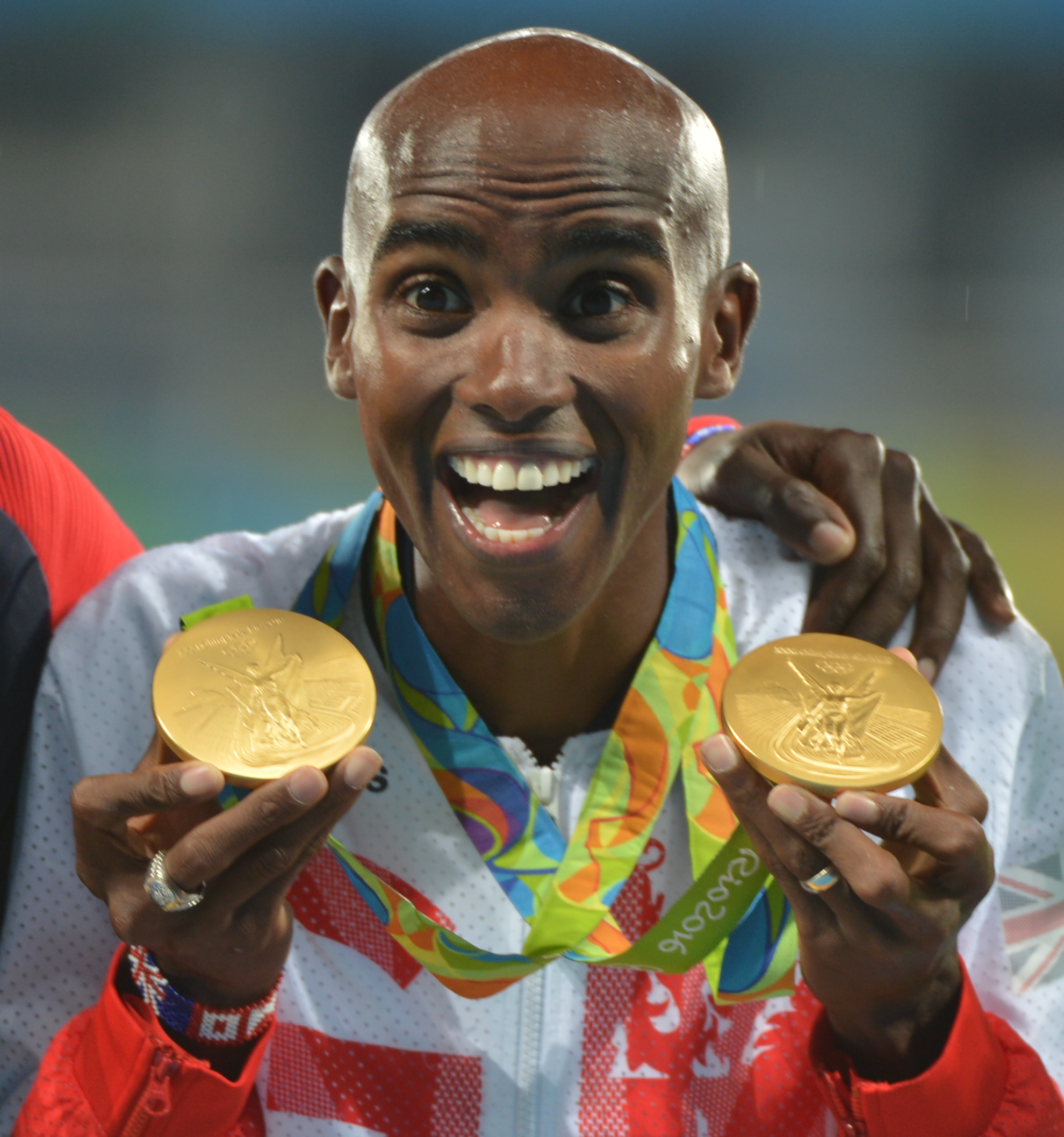
Olympics athlete Mo Farah

- Mo Farah – athlete; current 10,000 metres Olympic champion and 5000 metres Olympic, World and European champion; grew up in Hounslow
- Fenella Fielding – actress, lived in Chiswick
- Michael Flanders – entertainer, lived in Chiswick from 1971 to 1975
- E. M. Forster – author, a blue plaque in Arlington Park Mansions commemorates the flat where he lived until his death in 1970
- Ugo Foscolo – artist, died at Turnham Green in 1827, cenotaph in Chiswick churchyard
- Joe Fournier – undefeated international championship boxer and businessman, grew up in Hounslow, went to school and trained with Mo Farah
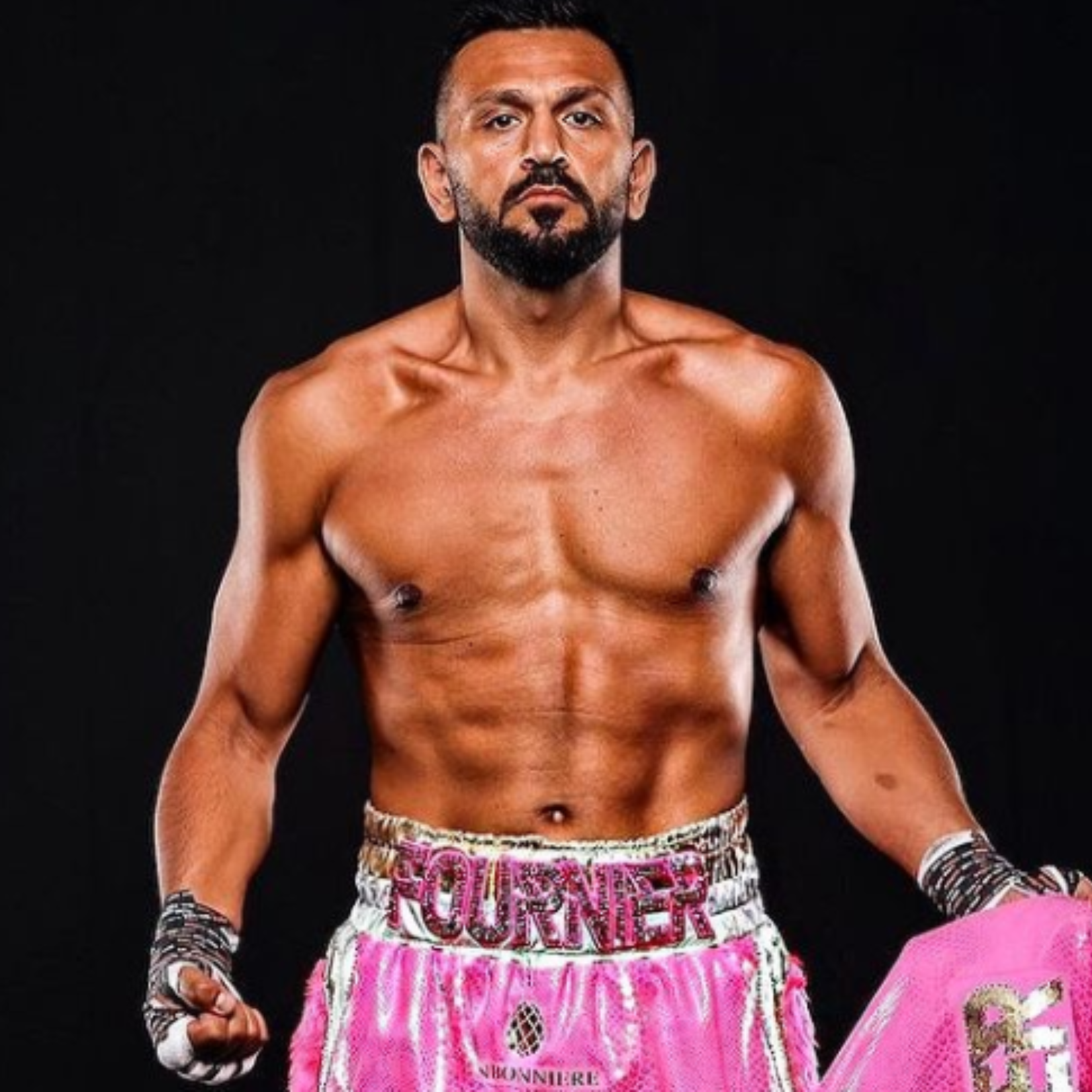
  Undefeated boxer Joe Fournier
- Stephen Fox – politician, had a country retreat in Chiswick from 1663

== G ==
- Joseph Gandy – architect, lived in Chiswick between 1833 and 1838
- Ian Gillan – rock singer for the band Deep Purple, born in Hounslow
- Ian Gilmour – politician, lived and died in Isleworth
- Edd Gould – YouTube webtoon creator of series Eddsworld, animator, artist and voice actor; lived and died in Isleworth
- Hugh Grant – actor, lived in Chiswick as a child
- Russell Grant – astrologer and resident of Staines, became Lord of Ashford in 1996
- Tanika Gupta – playwright, born in Chiswick

== H ==
- Jack Harries – member of YouTube group JacksGap (now known as Earthrise), was born and grew up in Chiswick with his twin brother
- Finn Harries – member of YouTube group JacksGap (now known as Earthrise), was born and grew up in Chiswick with his twin brother
- William Hartnell – actor, best known for playing The First Doctor in Doctor Who; lived in Isleworth in the 1960s
- Elias Henry "Patsy" Hendren – cricketer
- William Hogarth – country home at Chiswick from 1749 until his death
- Nicky Holloway – “superstar” DJ and record producer of the 80s and 90s, born in Isleworth
- Christopher “Luna-C” Howell – DJ, record producer and part of the music group Smart E's, born in Isleworth
- Charles Holland – actor, born in Chiswick
- Charles Hawtrey - actor, born in Hounslow star of successful Carry On films

== J ==
- Sally James – ITV presenter, born in Chiswick
- Mia Jenkins – actress, born in Feltham
- The Earls of Jersey – lived at Osterley Park near Hounslow from 1804 until the 1940s

== K ==
- Preeya Kalidas – singer and actress, born in Isleworth
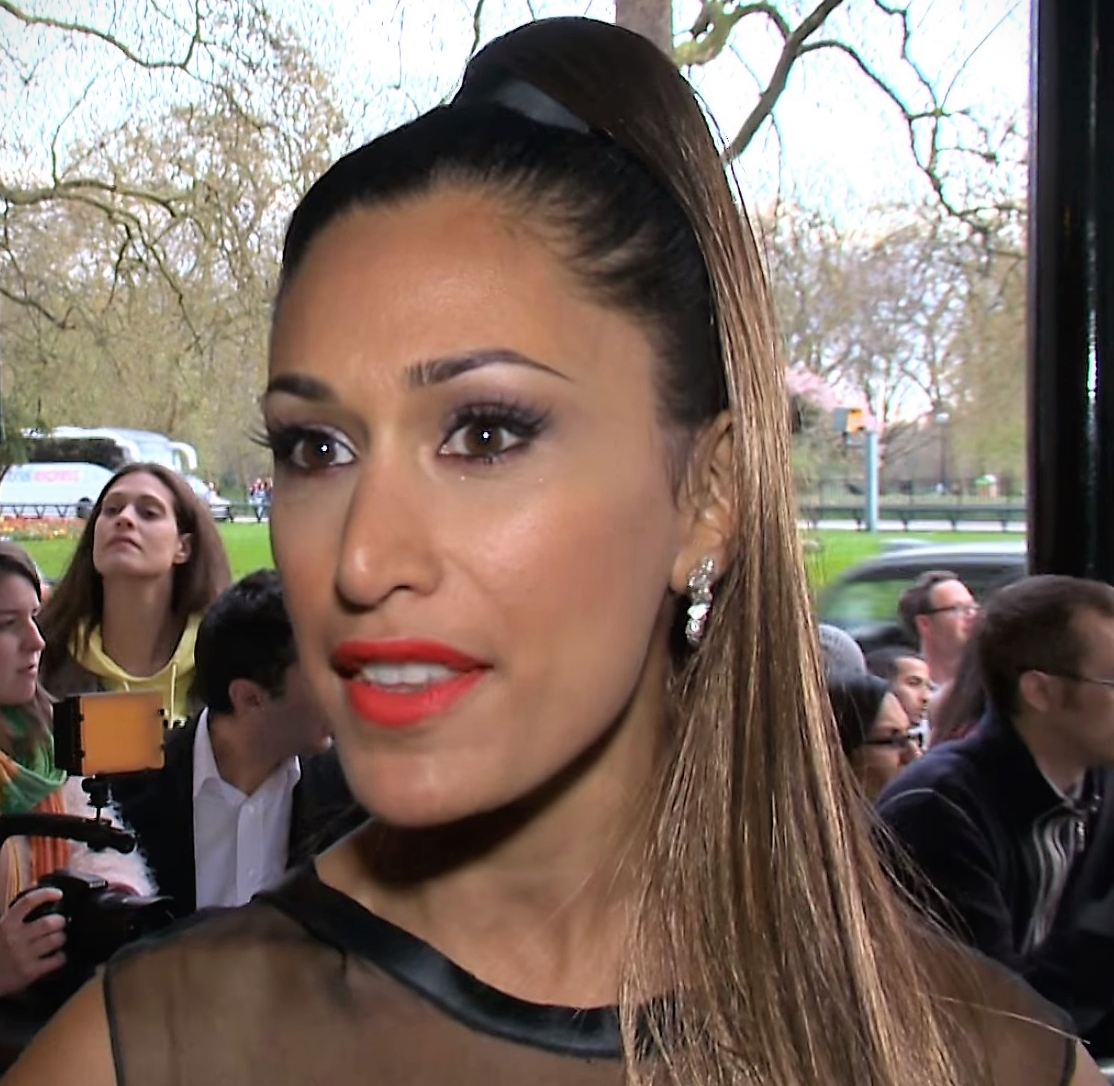
  Actress and Singer Preeya Kalidas
- Krupa Patel - singer, lived in Isleworth
- Patsy Kensit – actress, lived in Hounslow during her teenage years
- Henry Killigrew – playwright, born in Hanworth
- Ben Killip – professional footballer, born in Isleworth
- Olsi Krasniqi – Albanian rugby league player, grew up in Feltham
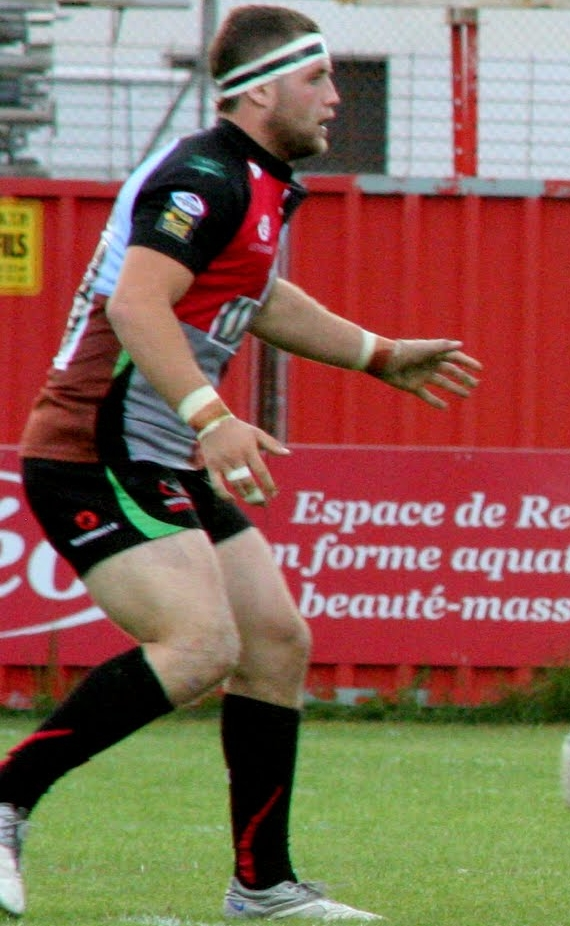
  Olsi Krasniqi, Rugby Player

== L ==
- Dave Lambert – musician, songwriter, member of The Strawbs; born in Hounslow
- Bernard Lee – actor, famous as "M" in the James Bond films 1962–79, born 1908 in Brentford
- John Lindley – botanist
- Avtar Lit – owner of Sunrise Radio, lives in Osterley
- Buster Lloyd-Jones – veterinarian, born in Feltham
- Nick Lowe – musician, songwriter, producer; resident of Brentford
- Dan Luger – Rugby World Cup winning winger, born in Chiswick

== M ==
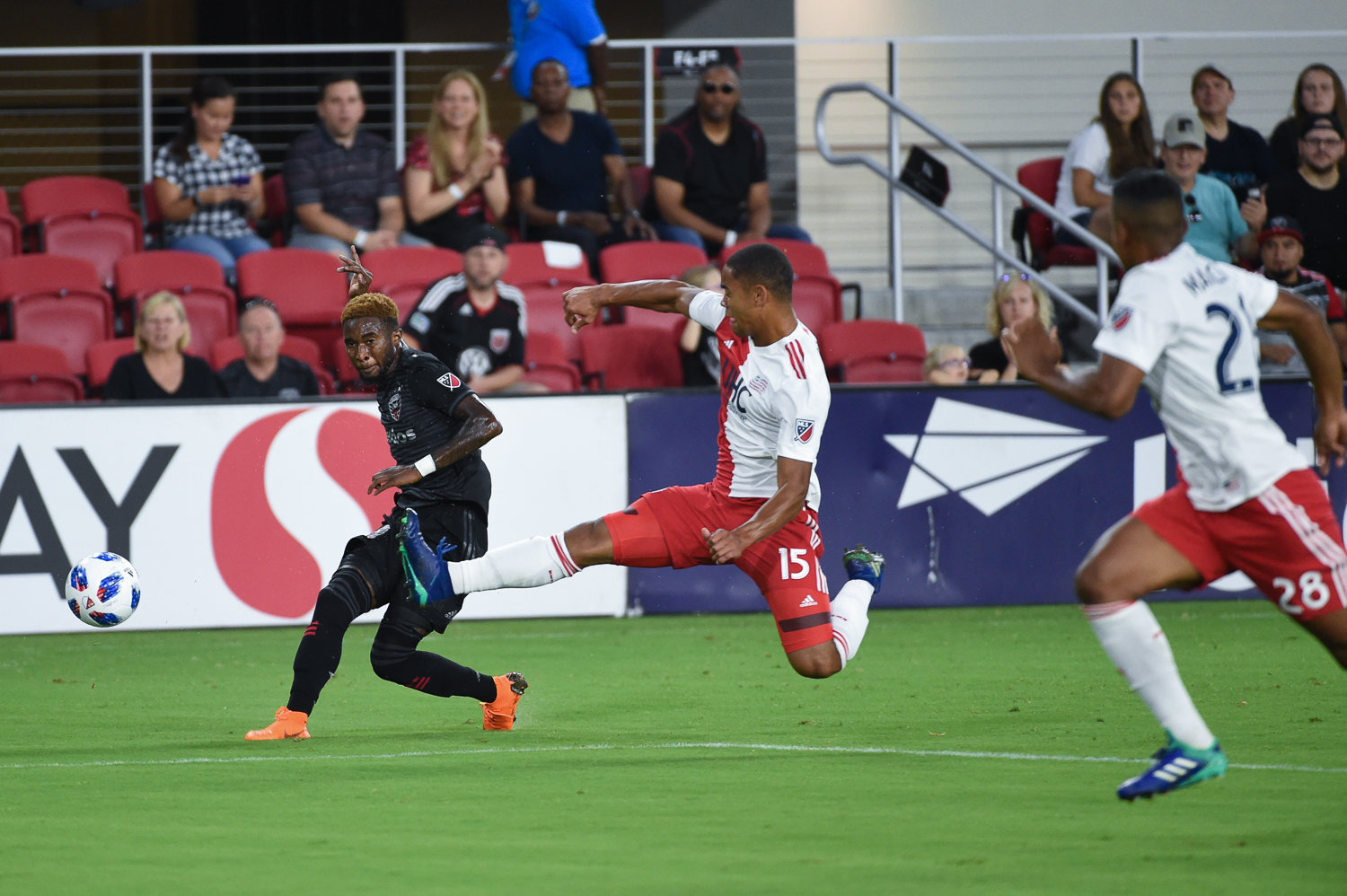
- Michael Mancienne (middle), football player of Seychelles National team
  Michael Mancienne – professional footballer, grew up in Feltham
- Betty Marsden – actor in Round The Horn and Carry On Camping, lived on a houseboat in Brentford until her death in 1998
- John Stanley Marshall – drummer and founding member of the jazz band Nucleus, born in Isleworth
- Dimitri Mascarenhas – cricketer; played internationally for England, born in Chiswick
- Ian Mcdonald – multi-instrumentalist musician known as founding member of the progressive rock band King Crimson and the Grammy-nominated band Foreigner, grew up in Osterley
- Freddie Mercury – British musician, singer, and songwriter, best known as the lead vocalist and lyricist of the rock band Queen, grew up in Feltham
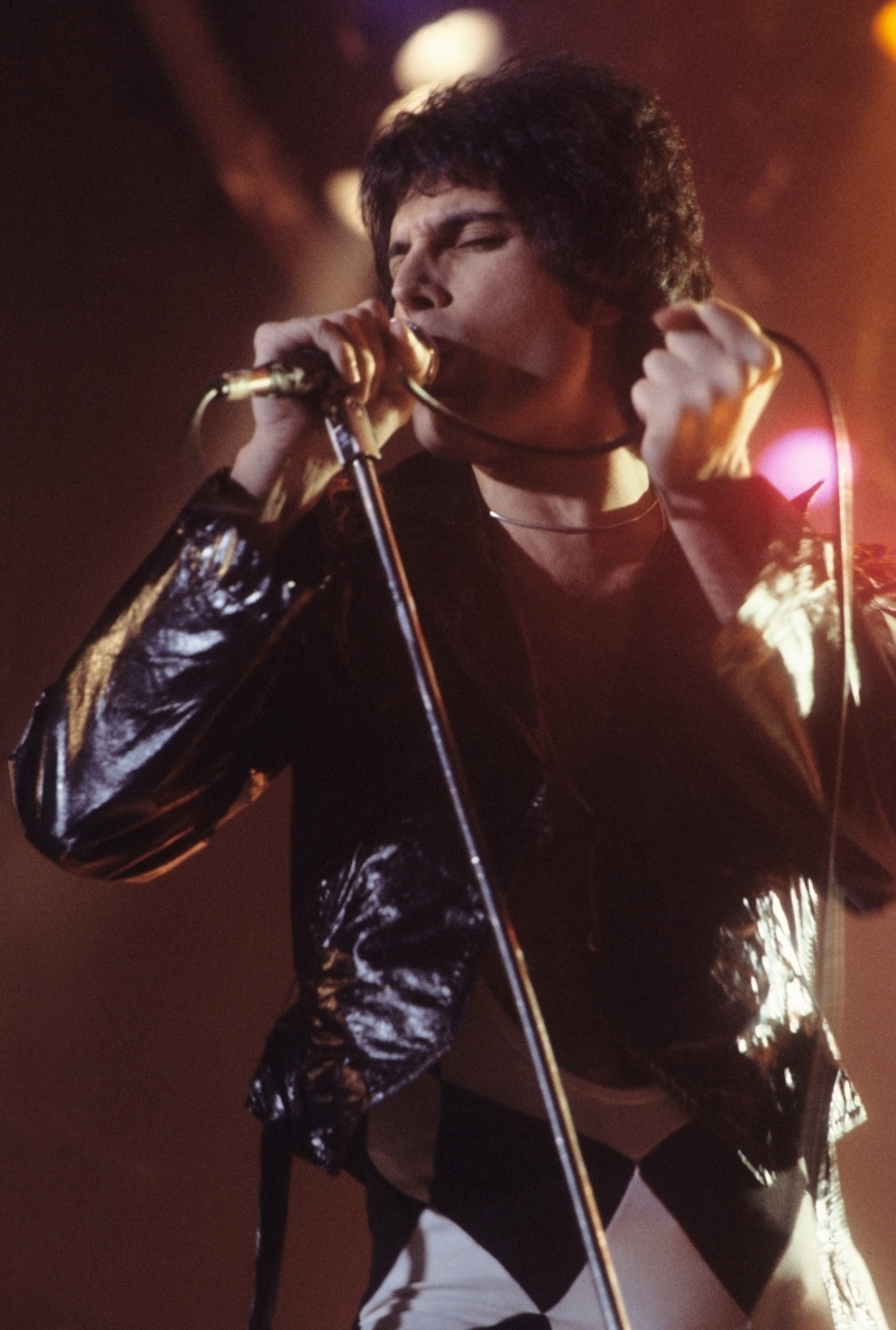
  Lead singer of Queen, Freddie Mercury
- Christopher John Millar (known as Rat Scabies) – drummer from The Damned, lives in Brentford
- Joe Miller – actor, lived at Strand-on-the-Green from 1686 to 1738
- Nancy Mitford – lived briefly at Strand-on-the-Green
- James Montgomrey – Brentford benefactor, owned and ran a large timber mill on Brentford High Street
- Mark Morriss – songwriter and lead singer of The Bluetones, grew up in Hounslow
- John Mousinho – professional football manager and former player, born in Hounslow
- Iris Murdoch – philosopher and novelist, brought up in Hounslow
- Sophia Myles – actress, grew up and went to school in Hounslow

== N ==
- Anne Nightingale – BBC radio and TV presenter, born in Osterley
- Dukes of Northumberland – have lived at Syon House since Henry Percy, 9th Earl of Northumberland bought the estate in 1594
- Kunal Nayyar – actor; was born in Hounslow. He is most famous for his role as Raj in CBS’ show The Big Bang Theory

== O ==
- John Ogdon – pianist, lived in Spring Grove, Isleworth
- Peter Oliver – painter, lived in Isleworth
- Rajiv Ouseph – badminton player and European champion as well as winning silver multiple times in the Commonwealth Games, born in Hounslow
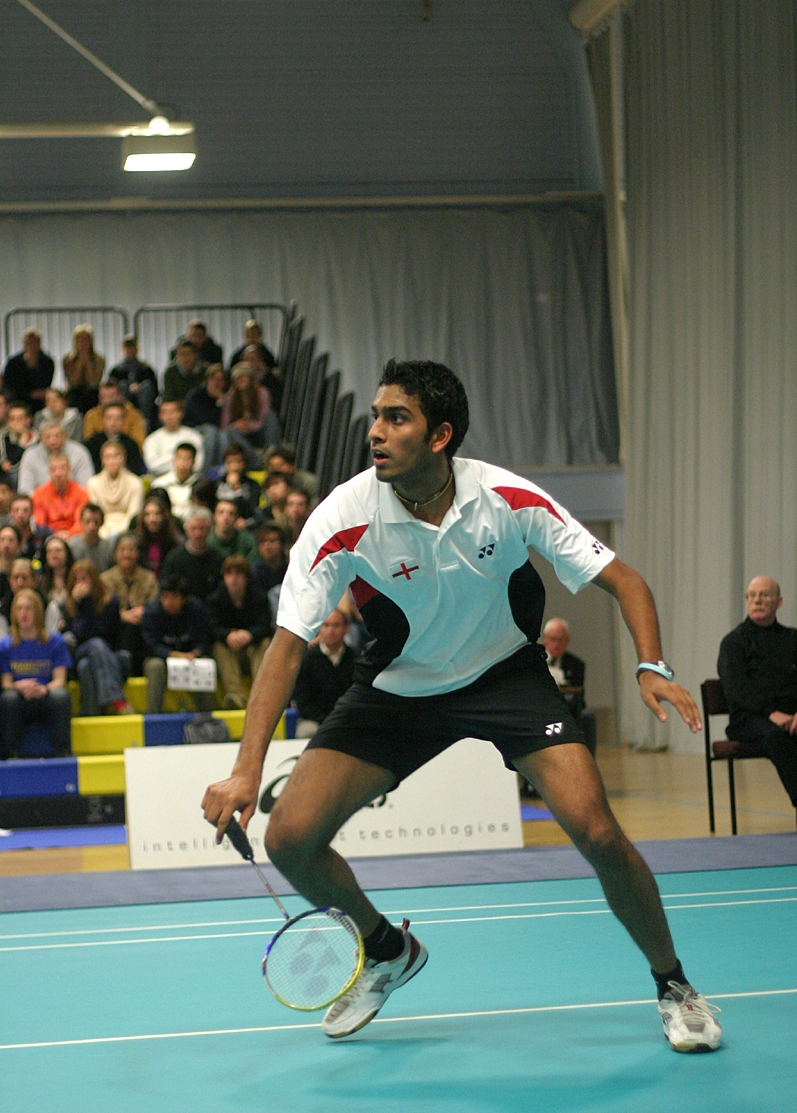
  Badminton medalist Rajiv Ouseph
- Alistair Overeem – mixed martial arts fighter, born in Hounslow
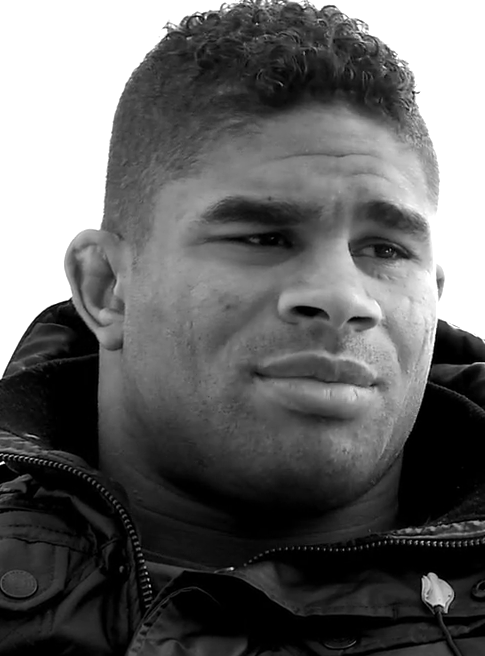
  MMA fighter Alistair Overeem
- Alun Owen – wrote screenplay to A Hard Day's Night

== P ==
- Jimmy Page – guitarist of the rock band Led Zeppelin, born in Heston
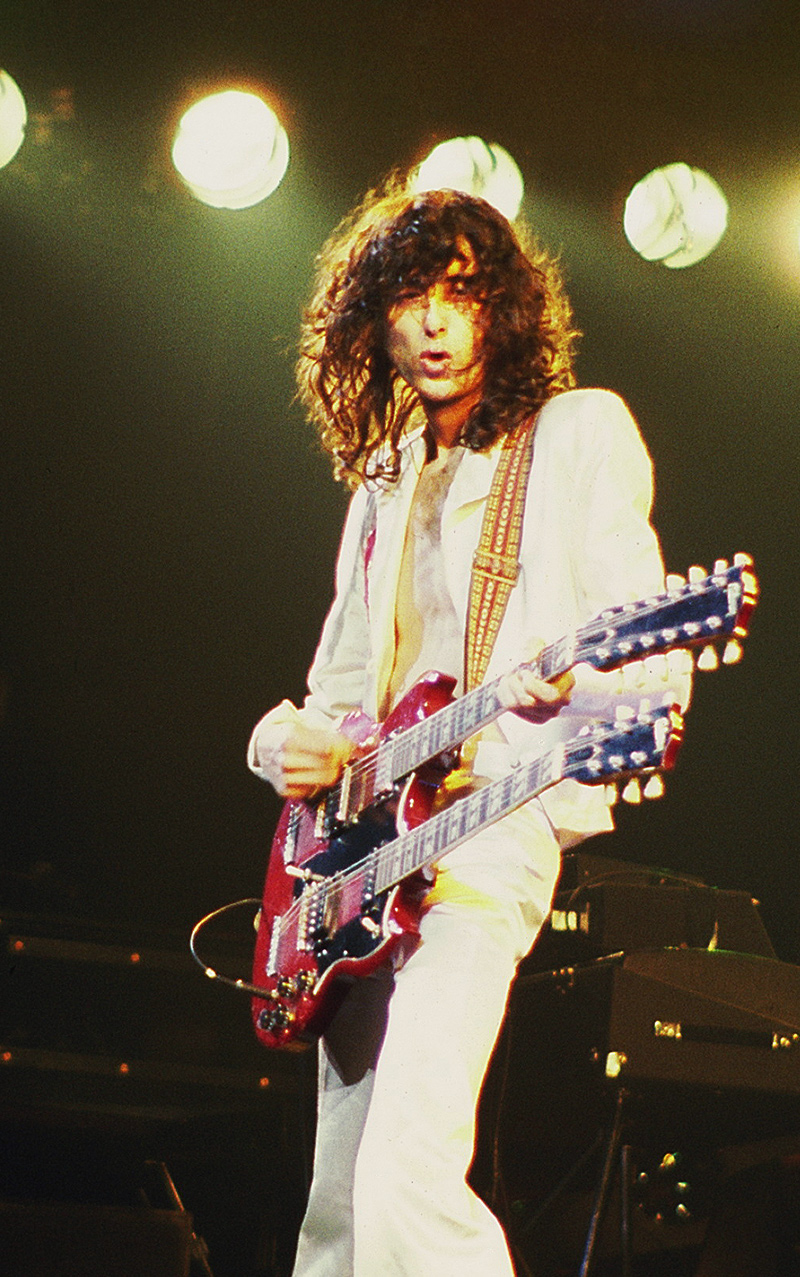
  Jimmy Page of Led Zeppelin
- Katherine Parkinson – actress, born in Hounslow
- Miles Peart-Harris – professional footballer for Brentford FC, grew up in Isleworth
- The Rev. Sir Robert Peat – Vicar of St Lawrence's, New Brentford
- Lucien Pissarro – artist
- Donald Pleasence – actor, lived at Strand-on-the-Green from 1973 to 1985
- Imogen Poots – actress and model, grew up in Chiswick
- Bertram Pollock – clergyman and Bishop of Norwich, born at Hanworth
- Ernest Pollock – brother of Bertram, politician and lawyer, lived at Hanworth and became the first Viscount Hanworth in 1936
- Elliott Power – music artist and director, grew up in Brentford

== R ==
- Redgrave family – actors, lived at Bedford House from 1945 to 1954
- Samuel Richardson – writer, tenant at Sutton Court from 1736 to 1738
- Hugh Ronalds – nurseryman, horticulturalist and author, lived his life on Brentford High Street

== S ==
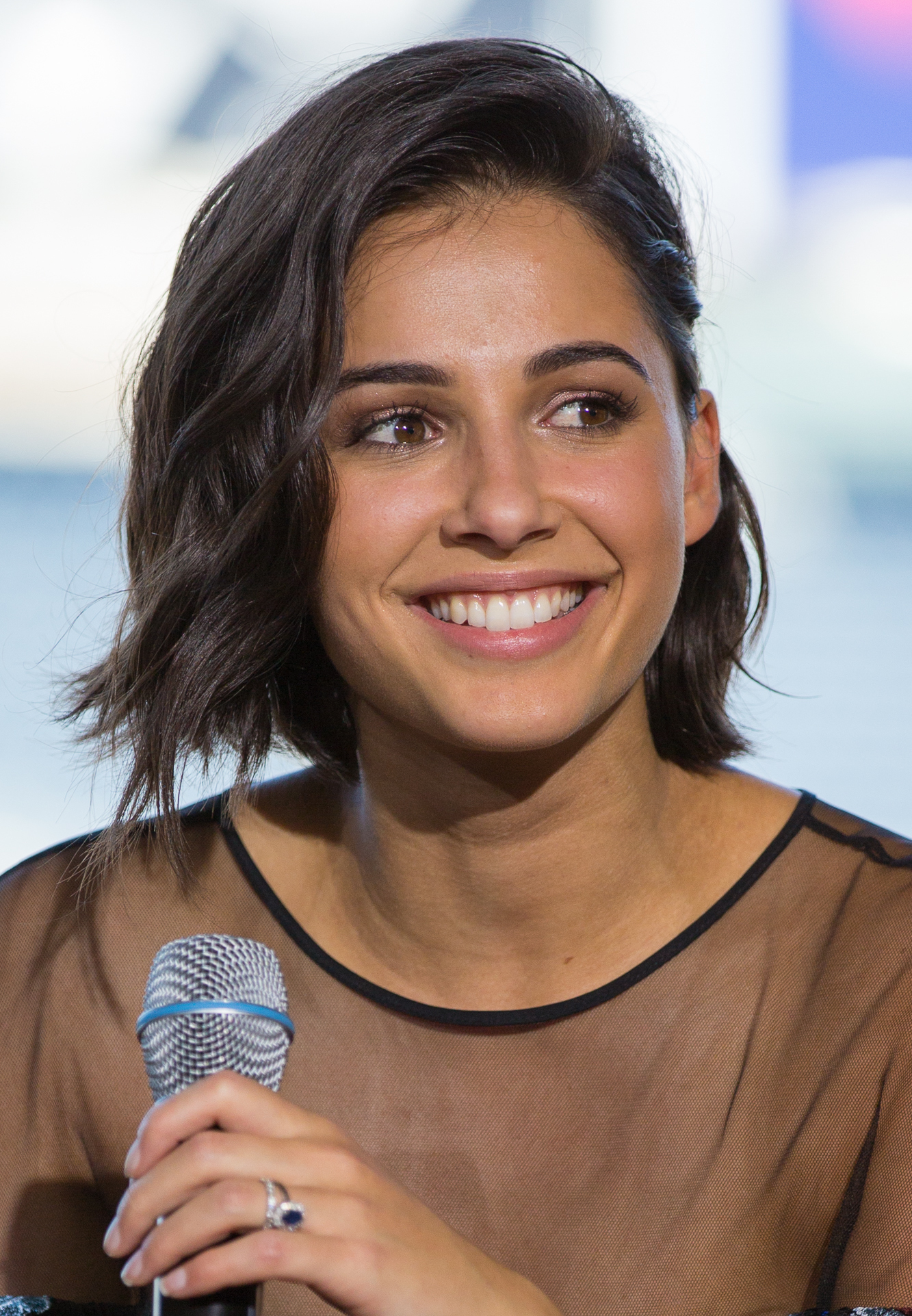
Actress Naomi Scott

- Naomi Scott – actress, singer and musician
- Jay Sean – R&B singer, signed to Lil Wayne's record company; born and raised in Hounslow
- Jack Simmons – historian, born in Isleworth
- Hannah Simone – lived in Hounslow
- Matt Somner – professional footballer, born in Isleworth
- Sergey Stepnyak-Kravchinsky – Russian revolutionary
- Seb Stegmann – rugby union player, grew up in Isleworth

== T ==
- Vince Taylor – English-American rock and roll singer, born in Isleworth
- David Tennant, Scottish actor, living in Chiswick
- Georgia Tennant, actress, living in Chiswick
- Pete Townshend – rock guitarist, singer, and songwriter; guitarist and principal songwriter of The Who
- Inigo Triggs – architect and garden designer, born in Chiswick
- Alexander Trotman – businessman and former CEO of Ford Motor Company, born in Isleworth
- Tuke family – mental healthcare reformers
- William Turner – artist, lived briefly in Isleworth

== V ==
- Tom Vek – musician, born in Hounslow
- Amar Virdi – cricketer, born in Chiswick
- Vincent van Gogh – lived briefly in Isleworth

== W ==
- Suki Waterhouse – model and actress, grew up in Chiswick
- Graham Westley – former professional footballer and manager, born in Hounslow
- Ben White – rugby player, born in Hounslow
- Maria Whittaker – former glamour model and spouse of Rebel MC, born in Hounslow
- Jack Wild – actor who played Artful Dodger in Oliver, grew up in Hounslow
- J. C. Winslow – Anglican missionary and hymn writer, born in Hanworth
- Kim Wilde – English pop singer
- James Woodburn-Hall – rugby player in the Jamaica international rugby team, born in Isleworth
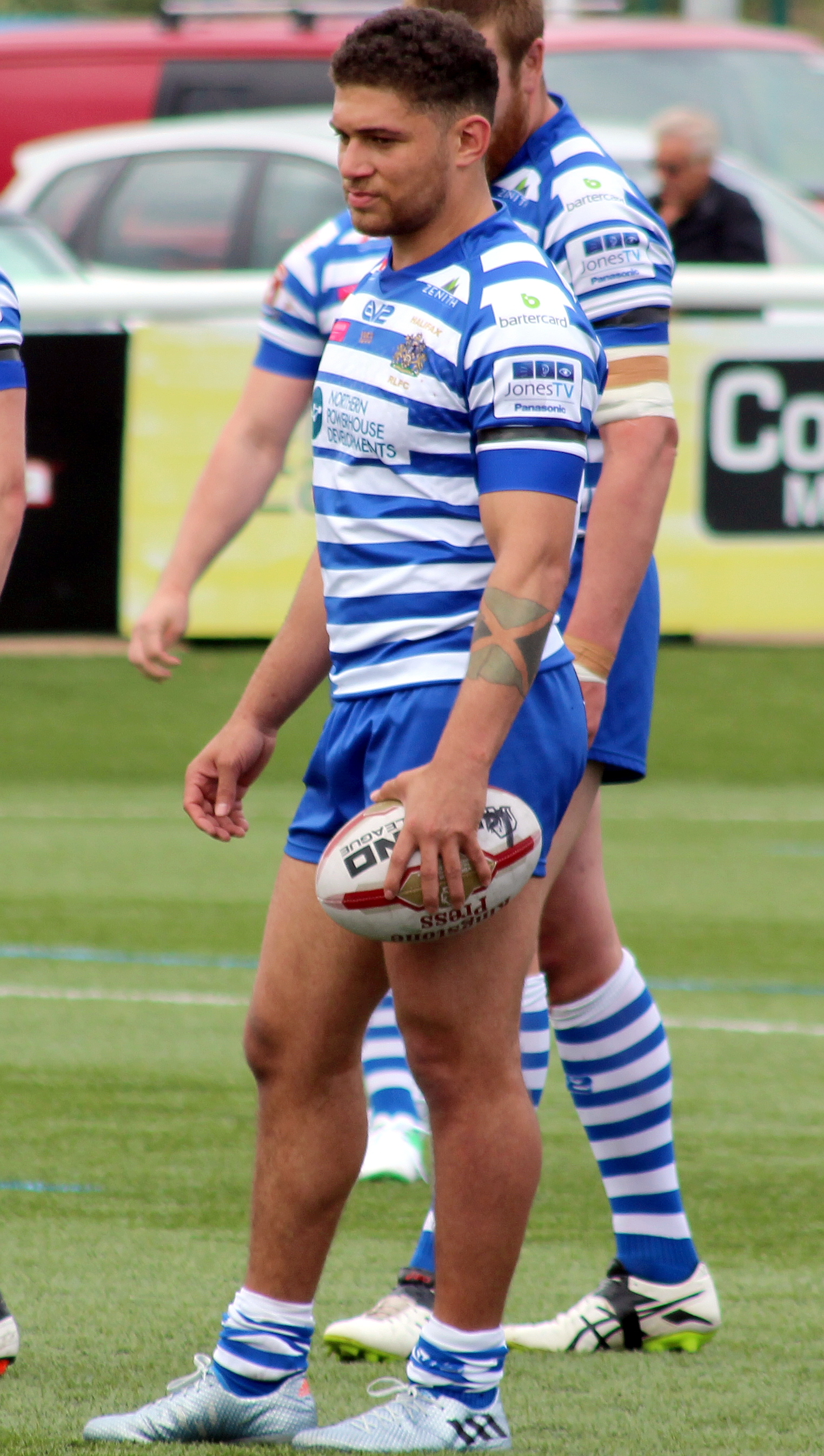
  Rugby player James Woodburn-Hall

== Z ==
- Johann Zoffany – artist, lived and died at Strand-on-the-Green
