= List of people from the London Borough of Haringey =

This is a list of notable people who were born in, lived in, or are otherwise associated with the London Borough of Haringey, a borough in north London, England.

== Notable people associated with Haringey ==
- Adele, singer
- David Lammy, MP for Tottenham
- Emer Kenny, actress
- Keith Blakelock, policeman
- Emily Bowes Gosse, artist
- Harry Champion, music hall composer and performer
- Teriy Keys, music executive, entrepreneur founder and co-chief executive officer of R.O.A.D. Group
- Rebel MC, aka Congo Natty, rapper, DJ and record producer
- Urban Species, band
- Dave Clark and the Dave Clark Five, 1960s pop group
- Charles Conder, painter
- Errol Dunkley, reggae musician
- William Edward Forster, industrialist and politician
- Edmund Gosse, poet, author, and critic
- Philip Gosse, naturalist, marine biologist
- Bernie Grant, politician
- Clare Grogan, singer, actress
- Maria Hack, educational writer and Quaker controversialist
- Steriker Hare, cricketer
- Jack Hawkins, actor
- Sir Rowland Hill, teacher, inventor, postal reformer
- Mark Hollis, composer, musician, singer-songwriter
- Len Hughes, footballer
- JME, rapper, co-owner of Boy Better Know and record producer
- Wretch 32, rapper
- John Eliot Howard, chemist
- Joseph Howard, MP, first MP for Tottenham
- Luke Howard, chemist, father of meteorology
- Olivia Dean, singer
- Bernard Jenkin, politician
- Leee John and Imagination, 1980s soul group
- Lemar, soul and R&B singer songwriter
- David Lyndon, Architect
- Harrison Marks, glamour photographer
- Pops Mensah-Bonsu, basketball player
- Trevor Peacock, actor
- Leslie Phillips, actor
- Simon Raymonde, musician and record producer
- Mike Reid, comedian
- Charlie Rowe, actor
- George Sewell, actor
- Skepta, rapper, co-owner of Boy Better Know and record producer
- Dennis Spooner, screenwriter and editor
- Jessie Wallace, actress
- Shani Wallis, actress and singer
- Mark Watson, comedian
- Keisha White, R&B singer
- Mike and Bernie Winters, comedians
- Chip, rapper and songwriter
- Ray and Dave Davies, brothers who formed the rock band The Kinks
