= List of people from the Royal Borough of Kingston upon Thames =

Among those who were born in the Royal Borough of Kingston upon Thames, or have dwelt within the borders of the modern borough are (in alphabetical order):

== Kingston upon Thames (town) ==
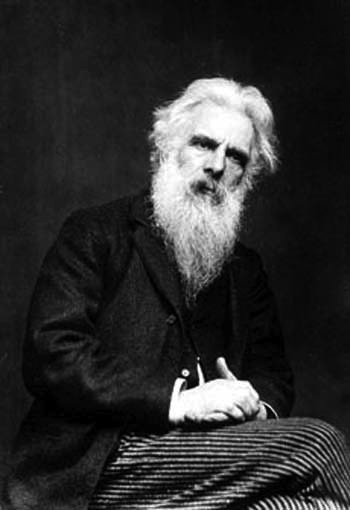
Eadweard Muybridge (photographer) was born in the town in 1830

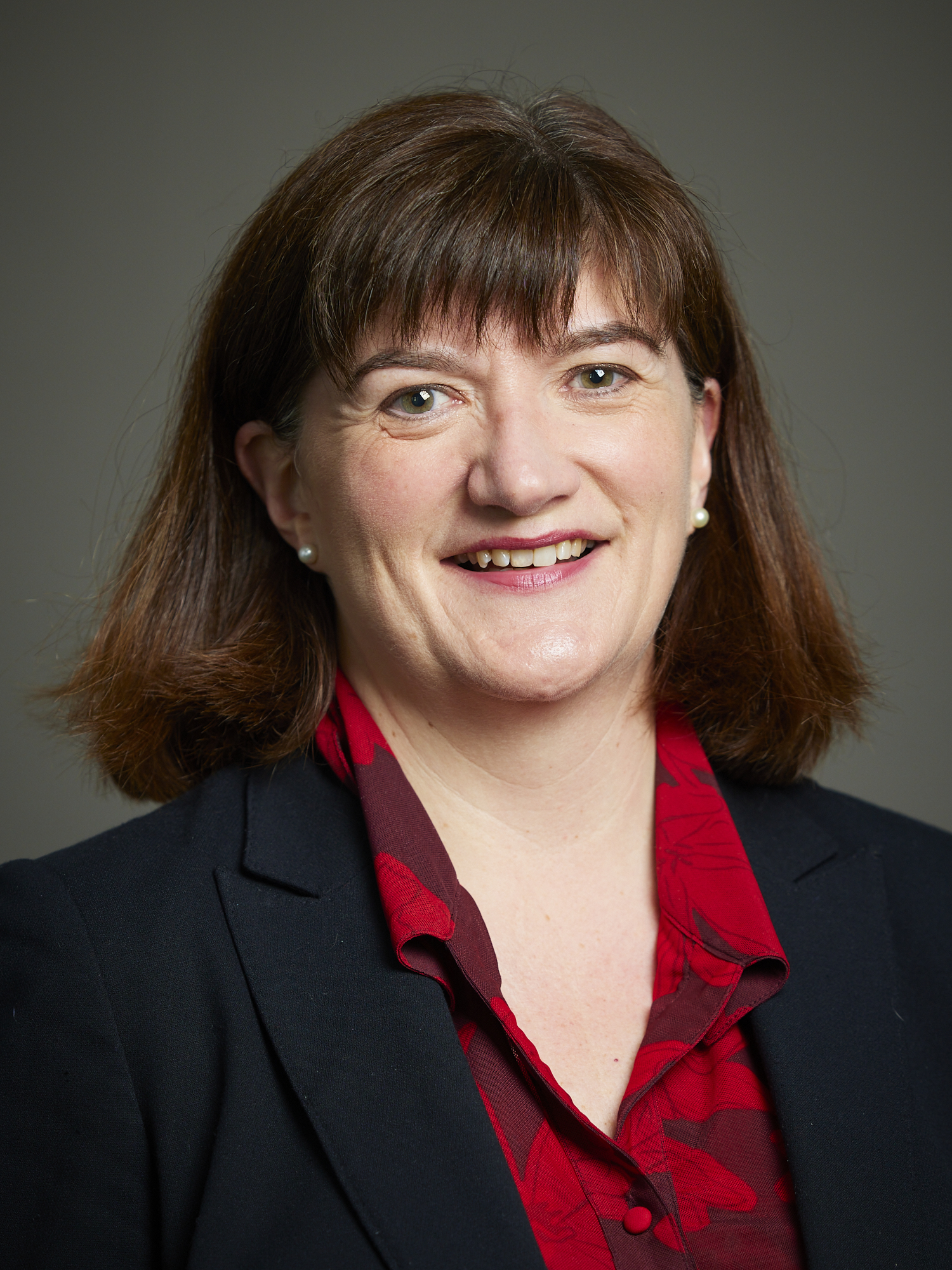
Nicky Morgan (politician) was born in the town in 1972.

- Joss Ackland, actor, lived at Ravenswood Court in Coombe
- Taiba Akhuetie, artist (1991/1992)
- India Amarteifio, actress, born in Kingston upon Thames.
- Clara Amfo, radio presenter (1984)
- Nigel Barley, anthropologist (1947)
- Cyril Joe Barton, World War II hero
- Harold Bauer, pianist, born 1873
- Erin Boag, professional ballroom dancer and star of Strictly Come Dancing (1975)
- Sydney James Bounds (1920–2006), author
- Derek Bourgeois, composer (1941)
- Tom Brown, satirist (1662–1704), lived at Kingston for three years when schoolmaster there
- Timothy Browning, mathematician
- John Bryant, journalist
- Richard Butler, lead singer of The Psychedelic Furs (1957)
- Donald Campbell, car and motorboat racer (1921)
- Jane Campbell, Baroness Campbell of Surbiton (1959)
- John Cleland, author (1709)
- Finn Cole, actor (1995)
- Joe Cole, actor (1988)
- Terence Conran, industrial designer, restaurateur, retailer and writer
- Matt Cooke, television presenter (1982)
- John Cooper, auto engineer (1923)
- Peter Cox, lead singer of Go West (1955)
- Victoria Crowe, painter (1945)
- William Daniell (1769), artist and engraver
- Sandy Denny, singer and musician
- Es Devlin, stage designer (1971)
- Chris Dreja, guitar, bass, and keyboards with 1960s band The Yardbirds (1963–1968) Box of Frogs (1983–1986)
- Lisa Faulkner (1973), actress
- William Evelyn St Lawrence Finny (1864–1952), physician, local politician (Mayor of Kingston upon Thames seven times) and historian
- Archibald Frazer-Nash (1889), engineer and car designer
- Nell Tiger Free (1999), actress
- Jorja Fox (2003), footballer
- John Galsworthy (1867–1933), author
- George Fisher Gilmour (1904–1984), artist, playwright, and filmmaker
- Dora Gordine (1895–1991), sculptor, lived at Dorich House (c 1937–1991), Kingston Vale, which is now a museum
- Pamela Green (1929–2010), glamour model, was born in Kingston
- Earl Haig (1861–1928), World War I general, lived at Ravenswood Court in Coombe
- Edward Highmore (1961), actor
- Herbert Hill (1867), cricketer
- Neon Hitch, singer (1986)
- Tom Holland (1996), actor
- John Hoyland, artist, built and worked from a studio in Kingston upon Thames from 1964
- Len Hutton (1916), English Test cricketer
- John Inverdale (1957), BBC broadcaster, born in Plymouth, but residing in Kingston upon Thames from 1964
- P.D.James, author, resident 1961–1966
- Stuart Latham (1912), first producer of Coronation Street
- Dean Lewington, footballer (1984)
- Sarah Lindsay (1980), Olympic speed skater
- Margaret Lockwood (1916–1990), actress, born in Karachi but lived her later years in Kingston
- Gren Lucas (1935–2022), botanist and conservationist at the Royal Botanic Gardens, Kew; from 1995 lived at Hornchurch Close, Ham, Kingston upon Thames
- John Martyn, singer, guitarist and songwriter (1948)
- Debbie McGee, television presenter and magician (1958)
- Jonny Lee Miller (1972), actor
- Jeremy Moon (1934), artist
- Ivor Moreton (1908–1984), pianist and singer, lived in Coombe.
- Nicky Morgan (1972), politician
- Eadweard Muybridge (1830), photographer
- Joan Neville (died 1660), executed for witchcraft in Kingston upon Thames
- Ingrid Newkirk (1949) founder of PETA
- Chiké Okonkwo (1982), actor
- Tom Onslow-Cole, British racing driver (1987)
- Mike Osborn (1917), military officer
- Katherine Parkinson (1978), actress
- Roy Plomley (1914), radio broadcaster, producer, playwright
- George Yeomans Pocock (1891), boatbuilder
- "Rat Scabies" (Christopher Millar), drummer for The Damned (1957)
- Steven Reid, footballer (1981)
- Kelly Reilly (1977), actor
- Declan Rice, England footballer (1999)
- Lynn Ripley a.k.a. Twinkle (1948)
- Patrick Roberts, professional footballer (1997)
- Tom Rowlands of the Chemical Brothers (1971)
- Anna Rust (1995), actor
- James Saunders, composer (1972)
- Luke Shaw, footballer for Manchester United F.C. (1995)
- Lucie Silvas, singer (1977)
- Tim Smith, singer and guitarist for Cardiacs (1961–2020)
- James Squire, transported convict and brewer in Australia (1754)
- Alec Stewart, former England cricket captain
- Stormzy, rapper, lives in Kingston
- Dudley Sutton, actor (1933–2018)
- Dave Swarbrick, folk fiddle player (1941)
- Lynne Truss, author, born in Kingston upon Thames in 1955
- Jacqueline Wilson, grew up and went to school in Kingston
- Steven Wilson, musician (1967)
