= List of people from the London Borough of Sutton =

The following is a list of people who were born in the London Borough of Sutton, or have dwelt within the borders of the modern borough (in alphabetical order):

- Martin Adams, BDO Darts World Champion, born in Sutton
- Harry Aikines-Aryeetey, world-class sprinter, attended Greenshaw High School
- George Anson, 1st Baron Anson, admiral, owned Carshalton House
- Joan Armatrading, singer-songwriter and musician, lived in Sutton in the 1970s
- Tony Barton, Aston Villa's 1982 European Cup winning manager, from Sutton
- David Bellamy, broadcaster and botanist, attended Sutton Grammar School
- Sally Anne Bowman, up-and-coming model, was murdered in Croydon, South London
- Sir Francis Carew, grandson of Sir Nicholas Carew; of Beddington Park; Elizabethan horticulturalist
- Sir Nicholas Carew, sheriff of Surrey and Sussex, Master of the King's Horse, executed by Henry VIII
- Jeff Beck, born and raised in Wallington
- Noël Coward, actor and playwright, lived in Lenham Road, Sutton until the age of six
- Quentin Crisp, writer and gay icon
- Clark Datchler, lead singer of Johnny Hates Jazz
- Sir John Fellowes, 1st Baronet, owned Carshalton House (now St Philomena's Girls' School) and built the adjacent Water Tower and perhaps the 'Hermitage' in the garden
- David Fletcher, former Surrey cricketer
- Elizabeth Glover, who introduced the printing press to New England, was married to the Reverend Joseph Glover, Rector of Sutton
- Bradley McIntosh, member of former chart topping band S Club 7, attended Greenshaw High School
- Katie Melua, award-winning singer, songwriter and musician, lived on Gander Green lane and attended Nonsuch High School for girls
- Brian Paddick, British Liberal Democrat politician, attended Sutton Grammar School for Boys
- Mike Parry, author, journalist, radio host and controversialist
- Sidney Richard Percy, painter, lived in Mulgrave Road, Sutton
- John Radcliffe, physician and benefactor to the University of Oxford, owned Carshalton House
- Michael Reeves, writer and director of horror classic Witchfinder General
- The Rolling Stones were discovered at the then Red Lion pub (now the Winning Post) in Sutton; the pub was also where Charlie Watts and Bill Wyman became permanent members of The Rolling Stones, on 23 January 1963.
- Joanna Rowsell, world championship gold medal cyclist
- Sir Harry Secombe, humourist, singer, comedian, entertainer and member of the Goon Show cast; local resident and personality; the Secombe Theatre in Sutton is named after him
- Melanie South, British tennis player, attended Nonsuch High School for girls
- Neil Sullivan, Sutton-born Scottish international goalkeeper
- Graham Sutherland, painter, etcher and designer, attended Homefield Preparatory School, Sutton
- William Talbot, 1st Earl Talbot, peer and politician, is buried in Sutton churchyard
- Barry Tebb, poet, novelist, editor, translator, founder of Sixties Press; mental health campaigner
- Sarah Tullamore, actress and singer
- Philip Yorke, 1st Earl of Hardwicke, Lord High Chancellor, owned Carshalton House
