= List of people from the London Borough of Merton =

The following is a list of people who were born in the London Borough of Merton, or have dwelt within the borders of the modern borough (in alphabetical order):

== A ==
- Khalid Abdalla – actor, The Kite Runner and United 93
- Admiral Mariot Arbuthnot – commander of the Royal Navy in North America during the American War of Independence
- Bob Astles – former associate of Ugandan presidents Milton Obote and Idi Amin
- Ray Austin – TV and film director, actor, stuntman; born in Merton

== B ==
- Barloc of Norbury
- Ben Barnes – actor, The Chronicles of Narnia, Prince Caspian
- Cyril Barton – posthumously awarded the Victoria Cross during World War II
- Ian Bazalgette – posthumously awarded the Victoria Cross during World War II
- Sir Joseph Bazalgette (1819–1891) – civil engineer; his creation in the mid-19th century of the sewer network for central London eliminated cholera epidemics
- Siobhan Benita – former civil servant
- Dave Benson-Phillips – children's television presenter, lived in Cannon Hill Lane
- Bernard Braden – TV personality, mainly of the 1960s
- Jo Brand – comedian, lived in Mitcham
- Martin Brett (Brett Martini) – musician, voice of Beehive
- Richard Briers – actor
- Raymond Briggs – cartoonist
- Steve Brookstein – winner of the first series of TV talent show The X Factor
- James Brunlees – engineer, lived at Argyle Lodge, Parkside
- Roy Budd – jazz musician
- Josephine Butler – feminist campaigner of the Victorian era, Blue Plaque at 8 North View, Wimbledon Common

== C ==
- Jane Campbell, Baroness Campbell of Surbiton – British peer and commissioner of the Equality and Human Rights Commission
- Anthony Caro – sculptor, born in New Malden in 1924
- George Edward Cates – World War I Victoria Cross recipient
- Ernst Boris Chain – joint winner of the 1945 Nobel Prize in Medicine for the discovery of penicillin; Blue Plaque at 9 North View, Wimbledon Common
- Mavis Cheek – novelist born and brought up in Wimbledon
- Sarah Churchill, Duchess of Marlborough – close friend of Queen Anne
- Danny Cipriani – rugby player
- Norman Coburn – actor, played Donald Fisher in Australian soap opera Home and Away
- Vernon Corea – radio broadcaster
- Annette Crosbie – actress, screen wife of Victor Meldrew in the BBC TV sitcom One Foot in the Grave
- Ambrose Crowley – ironmaster
- Steve Curtis – eight-time World Offshore powerboat racing champion

== D ==
- Sean Davis – footballer, played for Bolton Wanderers, Fulham, Tottenham Hotspur and Portsmouth
- Clint Dempsey – footballer, during his playing career at Fulham
- Sandy Denny – singer, born at the Nelson Hospital
- Laurence Doherty – winner of thirteen Wimbledon tennis championships and two Olympic gold medals
- Reginald Doherty – winner of twelve Wimbledon tennis championships and three Olympic gold medals
- John Donne – Jacobean poet
- Hugh Dowding – commander of RAF Fighter Command during the Battle of Britain in 1940, Blue Plaque at 3 St Mary's Road
- Henry Dundas, Viscount Melville – home secretary and secretary of state for War to William Pitt the Younger, resident of Cannizaro House

== F ==
- The Field Mice – pop group
- Michael Fielding – The Mighty Boosh comedian; Noel's younger brother
- Noel Fielding – The Mighty Boosh comedian
- Mike Fillery – footballer
- Ford Madox Ford (1873–1939) – author; works include The Good Soldier and Parade's End

== G ==
- Paul Geraghty – author, illustrator
- David Gibson – cricketer
- John William Godward – painter
- Good Shoes – indie music band
- Charles Patrick Graves – journalist
- Robert Graves – poet
- Deryck Guyler – actor

== H ==
- Victoria Hamilton – actress
- George Hamilton-Gordon, 4th Earl of Aberdeen – prime minister 1852–55; resident of Cannizaro House
- Florence Harmer – historian, born in Mitcham
- Will Hay – actor
- Tubby Hayes – jazz musician
- Georgette Heyer – novelist, born and grew up in Wimbledon; wrote her first five novels there; a later novel, Pastel, is set in a suburb very like Wimbledon
- Leslie Hore-Belisha, 1st Baron Hore-Belisha – while minister of transport, 1934–37, he introduced the driving test and the Belisha Beacon; then secretary of state for war, 1937–40
- John Horne Tooke – politician, lived at Chester House on Wimbledon Common
- Neil Howlett – opera singer, born in Mitcham
- Thomas Hughes – author of Tom Brown's Schooldays, written in Wimbledon
- James Hunt – 1976 Formula 1 World Champion

== J ==
- Vinnie Jones – former footballer and film actor

== K ==
- Barbara Kelly – TV personality
- Hetty King – music hall artiste and male impersonator; a blue commemorative plaque was erected on her home in Palmerston Road, Wimbledon by The Music Hall Guild of Great Britain and America in November 2010
- Lorelei King – actress
- Maxwell Knight – spymaster
- David Kynaston – author, historian

== L ==
- Jay Laga'aia – actor
- Don Lang – Britain's answer to Bill Haley; with his band, a mainstay of Britain's first television rock and roll programme Six-Five Special
- Libera – boy vocalists; regular contributors to the BBC's Songs of Praise TV programme; have toured extensively throughout the world; have released several chart-topping albums; based at St Phillip's Parish Church in Norbury
- Glen Little – footballer
- Sir Joseph Norman Lockyer – scientist and astronomer; joint discoverer of helium

== M ==
- M.I.A. – singer-songwriter and rapper
- Alexander Maconochie – founder of the Royal Geographical Society; penal reformer
- Frederick Marryat – author, Blue Plaque at Gothic Lodge, 6 Woodhayes Road; also lived at Wimbledon House
- John Martyn – singer-songwriter
- Master Shortie – MC
- Tony McGuinness – musician, Above and Beyond
- Mat McNerney – singer-songwriter, guitarist, grew up in Wimbledon and attended Donhead Catholic Prep School and Wimbledon College
- Will Mellor – actor
- Thomas Ralph Merton – physicist
- Sally Morgan – celebrity psychic medium
- Mud – glam rock group
- Marcus Mumford – musician, Mumford & Sons
- Gillian Murphy – dancer, American Ballet Theatre
- John Murray III (1808–1892) – publisher; significant publications include Charles Darwin's The Origin of Species; built a house called "Newstead" at Somerset Road

== N ==
- Lord Horatio Nelson – admiral; his estate, Merton Place, included part of Wimbledon at the eastern end of the Broadway, though strictly he was a resident of Merton, the neighbouring parish

== O ==
- Mikel John Obi – Chelsea FC defensive midfielder

== P ==
- F. W. J. Palmer – engineer, born here
- Alan Pardew – football manager
- Michelle Paver – author, Chronicles of Ancient Darkness
- Charles Pepys, 1st Earl of Cottenham – lord chancellor
- Augustus Porter – socialite
- Chris Powell – manager of The Championship football club Charlton Athletic, former footballer, grew up in Mitcham
- Sir William Henry Preece – developed English telephone system; Blue Plaque at Gothic Lodge, 6 Woodhayes Road
- Robert Prizeman – classical crossover music composer; choirmaster of Libera and St Phillip's Parish Church, Norbury; composed the BBC's Songs of Praise signature music
- Steve Punt – comedian

== R ==
- Oliver Reed – actor
- Diana Rigg – actress
- Laura Robson – Junior Wimbledon tennis champion
- Annie Ross – jazz singer
- Rox – musician
- Margaret Rutherford – actress, Blue Plaque at 4 Berkeley Place

== S ==
- Sampha – singer-songwriter, known for collaborative work with SBTRKT, Jessie Ware and Drake
- Arthur Schopenhauer – philosopher, Blue Plaque at Eagle House where he lived in 1803
- Ridley Scott – film director, Blade Runner and Gladiator
- Jay Sean – R&B singer
- Haile Selassie I of Ethiopia – guest at a house in Parkside while in exile from Ethiopia owing to the Italian invasion; his statue stands in Cannizaro Park
- Brian Sewell – art critic and media personality
- Slick Rick (Richard Walters) – rapper, hip-hop musician, born in Mitcham but moved to the Bronx, New York
- Shane Smeltz – New Zealand footballer: lived in Mitcham when he played for AFC Wimbledon
- Mark Edgley Smith – composer
- Alex Stepney – former Manchester United footballer and 1968 European Cup winner
- Steve-O – Jackass performer
- Bert Strudwick – cricket wicket-keeper
- Graham Stuart – footballer
- Dave Swarbrick – fiddler of Fairport Convention

== T ==
- Jamie T – singer-songwriter and musician
- Arnold Toynbee (1852–1883) – economic historian, Blue Plaque at 49 Wimbledon Parkside
- Joseph Toynbee (1815–1866) – surgeon, Blue Plaque at 49 Wimbledon Parkside
- Ralph Tubbs – architect; his buildings include the Dome of Discovery and Charing Cross Hospital
- John Mosely Turner – supercentenarian

== W ==
- Terri Walker – R&B and soul singer
- Max Wall – actor, comedian and entertainer
- David Walliams – actor, comedian, TV sensation, children's book writer, awarded OBE
- Charles Watson-Wentworth, 2nd Marquess of Rockingham (1730–1782) – twice prime minister
- William Allison White – recipient of the Victoria Cross
- William Wilberforce (1759–1833) – 19th-century anti-slavery campaigner
- Nigel Winterburn – football player
- Jamie Woon – singer-songwriter

== Y ==
- Young MC (Marvin Young) – hip-hop musician, born in Wimbledon and moved to Queens, New York

== Z ==
- Faryadi Sarwar Zardad – Afghan warlord; later tried for war crimes, convicted and imprisoned
