= Nina Rajarani =

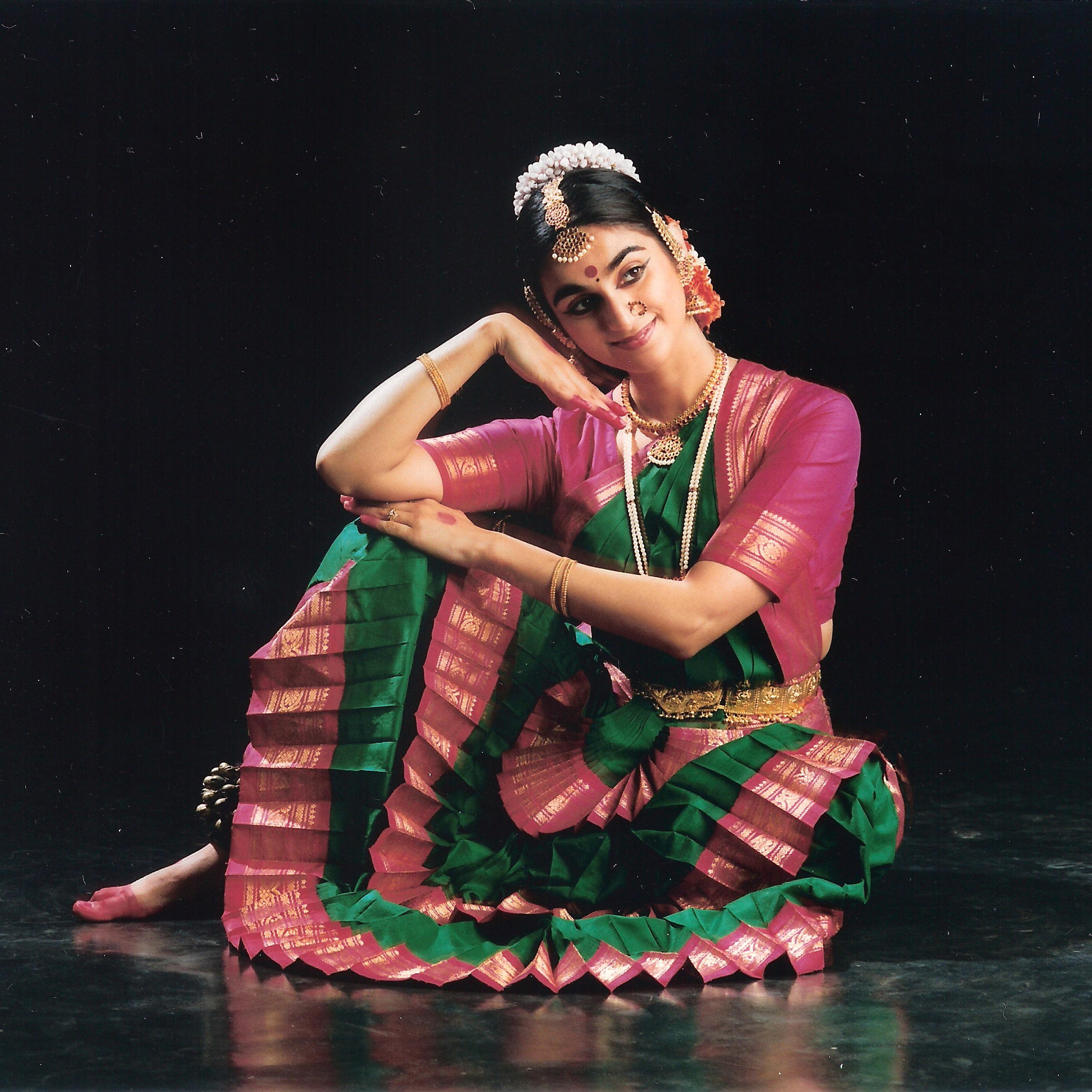
- Nina Rajarani in a reflective pose
- Born: New Delhi, India
- Occupations: choreographer, dancer
- Years active: 1990 - present
- Website: http://www.srishti.co.uk

Nina Rajarani, MBE, is a South Asian dancer and Artistic Director of Srishti - Nina Rajarani Dance Creations.

Nina Rajarani was awarded the Diploma in Bharatanatyam from the Bharatiya Vidya Bhavan in 1986 and in 1987 she staged her Arangetram. Rajarani has toured as a performer in the UK, Europe, Singapore, Malaysia and Australia.

Nina Rajarani was awarded an MBE in the Queen’s 2009 Birthday Honours, in recognition of her services to South Asian Dance. The award was announced on 13 June 2009.

After a three-year hiatus from performance, Rajarani returned to the stage in March 2010 in the touring company showcase These Are A few Of My Favourite Things.
