= List of people from the London Borough of Waltham Forest =

Waltham Forest is the birthplace of William Morris, best known as one of the principal founders of the British Arts and Crafts Movement. Morris was a designer of wallpaper and patterned fabrics, a writer of poetry and fiction, and a pioneer of the socialist movement in Britain.

Other famous people, such as footballer and former England Captain David Beckham; actor Derek Jacobi, star of I, Claudius; former Essex and England Cricket Captain Graham Gooch, and film director and producer Alfred Hitchcock, were also born in the borough.

Among those who were born in the London Borough of Waltham Forest, or have dwelt within the borders of the modern borough are (alphabetical order):

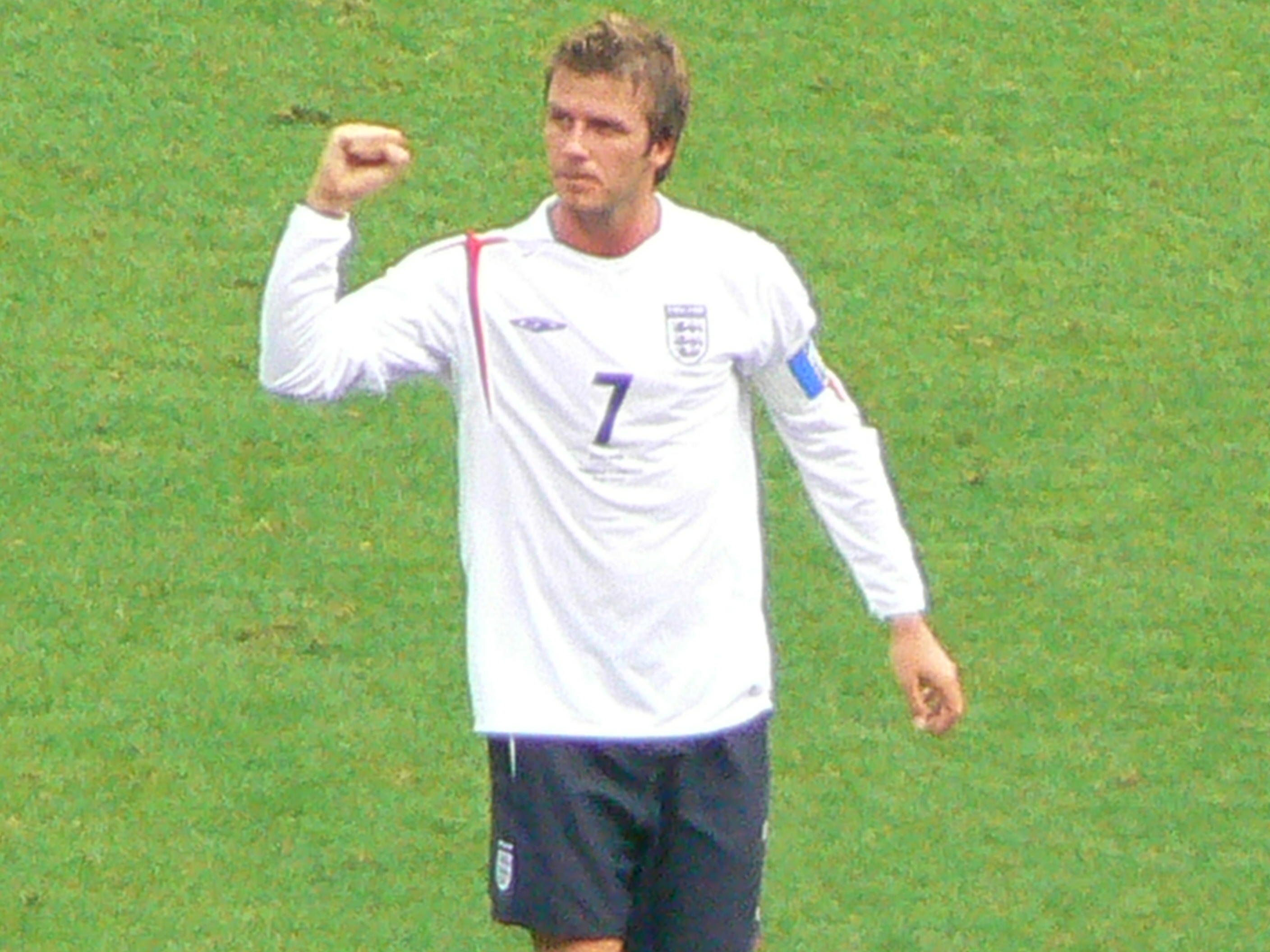
David Beckham

== List ==
- Naomi Ackie, actress
- Patrick Agyemang
- Damon Albarn
- Keith Albarn, manager of Soft Machine and father of Damon Albarn, taught art at Walthamstow College of Art in the 1960s
- Jodi Albert, former Hollyoaks actress
- Richard Ayoade
- Danny Bailey
- David Bailey
- Trevor Bailey, Essex and England cricketer
- Jill Barklem
- Robert Barltrop
- Graham Barnfield, pundit and academic, moved to Highams Park in 2001. He lived in the former home of actress Tara Moran.
- David Beckham, grew up in Chingford having been born at Whipps Cross Hospital in Leytonstone on 2 May 1975; as a child he attended Chingford School and played football for Ridgeway Rovers, a local side
- Steve Bell
- John Berger, socialist artist and writer, lived in Highams Park as a child
- Peter Blake (artist), artist, painted sleeve cover of the Beatles Sgt. Peppers Lonely Hearts Club Band
- Blazin' Squad, members of the band lived in or near Highams Park and studied at Highams Park School
- Paul Boateng
- Mick Box, guitarist for Uriah Heep born in Walthamstow
- Boy Kill Boy
- Matthew Bourne, choreographer and dancer, was born in Walthamstow
- Frederick Bremer, inventor
- Sir Reader William Bullard
- Lee Butcher, Leyton Orient Goalkeeper
- Edward Buxton (conservationist)
- David Cairns, musician, guitarist with Secret Affair was born in Walthamstow
- Cartrain
- Maurice Chambers
- Cornelius Cardew
- Harry Cohen, MP for Leyton, attended Selwyn School
- Terry Coldwell
- Terry Cole
- Phil Collen, lead guitarist of Def Leppard
- Jack Cornwell VC, born in Leyton in 1900
- Fanny Cradock
- Bobby Crush
- Sir John Dankworth, jazz musician, born in Highams Park in 1927, attended Selwyn School and Sir George Monoux Grammar School
- Paul Di'Anno, lead singer of Iron Maiden 1978–1981.
- Alan Davies, stand-up comedian and regular guest on quiz show QI, was born in Chingford
- Curtis Davies, Premiership footballer
- Chris Day
- Eric Deakins
- Joe Dever, author and games designer, was born in Chingford in 1956
- Adam Devlin, guitarist for The Bluetones lives in Walthamstow

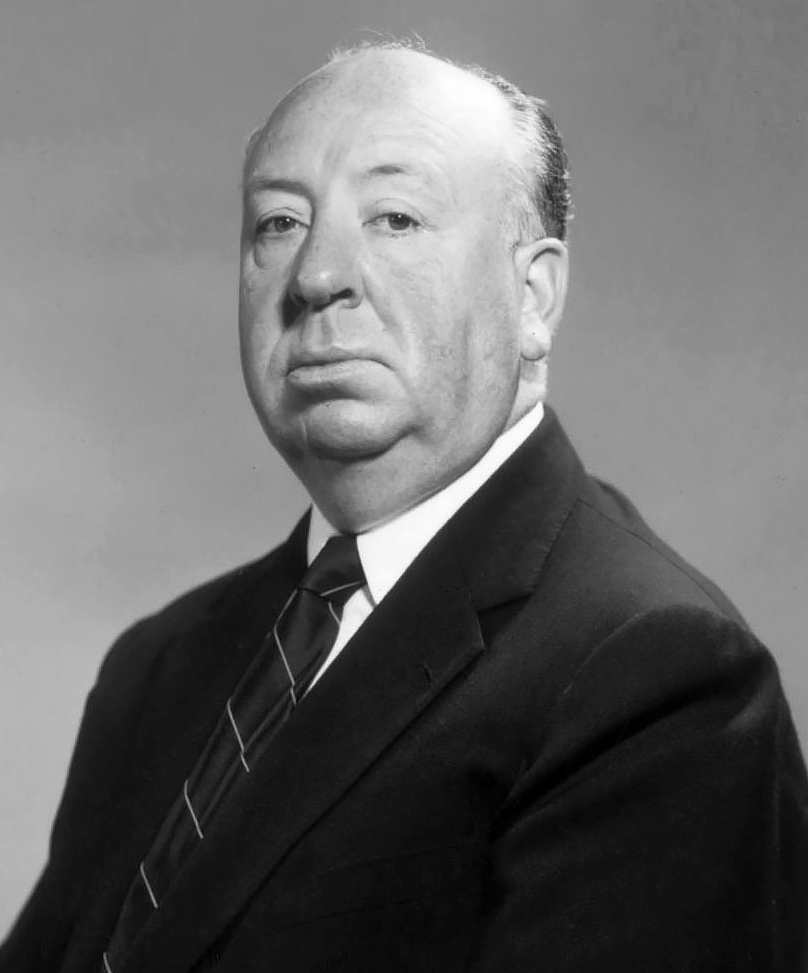
Alfred Hitchcock

- Benjamin Disraeli, former British Prime Minister, attended Higham Hall School in Walthamstow
- John Drinkwater
- Iain Duncan Smith, MP
- Ian Dury, singer and songwriter, studied at Walthamstow Art College
- Fleur East, singer-songwriter, runner-up to The X Factor UK, 2014
- East 17, British pop boy band, including singer/songwriter Brian Harvey
- Sir George Edwards (aviation), aircraft designer (Concorde) and industrialist was born in Hale End Road, Highams Park, on 9 July 1908.
- Eamon Everall, studied at Waltham Forest School of Art
- Ken Farnes
- Joanne Fenn
- Patrik Fitzgerald
- Marion Foale
- Quinton Fortune
- James Foster (cricketer, born 1980)
- Samantha Fox
- Dwight Gayle
- Neil Gerrard, MP for Walthamstow
- Terry Gibson
- Sir Stephen Gomersall
- Graham Gooch
- Jon Goodman
- Nickolas Grace
- Michael Grandage
- Peter Greenaway, CBE
- Mark Greenstreet
- Gunshot (British Hip hop group)
- Fitz Hall
- King Harold I
- Steve Harris, founder and bass player of Iron Maiden
- Brian Harvey (musician)
- Martin Hayes (footballer)
- Paul Hayes (footballer)
- Darren Hayman I
- Barry Hearn
- Don Henderson
- Peter Hennessy, historian
- John Hewer "Captain Birdseye"
- Steve Hillage
- James Hilton
- Sir Alfred Hitchcock
- David Holdsworth
- Dean Holdsworth
- Helen Hollick
- Richard Holmes (military historian)
- Tom Hood, humourist and playwright, born at Lake House in 1835
- Sydney Horler
- Justin Hoyte
- Mick Hume, journalist
- Nasser Hussain, OBE
- Doug Insole, England cricketer
- Jonathan Ive, designed the iPod (all generations) iMac (all generations), iBook, Powerbook, MacBook and MacBook Pro, as well as the new iPhone
- Iron Maiden
- Derek Jacobi
- Harry Kane
- Tolga Kashif
- Colin Kazim-Richards
- Lena Kennedy
- The Kray twins, buried in Chingford cemetery
- Kwasi Kwarteng, Conservative Party politician
- Terry Lawless
- T. E. Lawrence
- Lethal Bizzle
- Leyton Buzzards
- John Lill
- Russell Lissack, from Bloc Party grew up in Chingford
- Natasha Little
- Valentine McEntee, 1st Baron McEntee
- Morell Mackenzie
- Bryan Magee
- Dominic McVey, Britain's youngest self-made millionaire
- Shazia Mirza
- George Allan Mitchell, VC
- Chris Moncrieff, political journalist
- George Monoux, Lord Mayor of the City of London, 1514
- Bobby Moore
- Tara Moran
- More Fire Crew
- Ian Morgan
- Roger Morgan

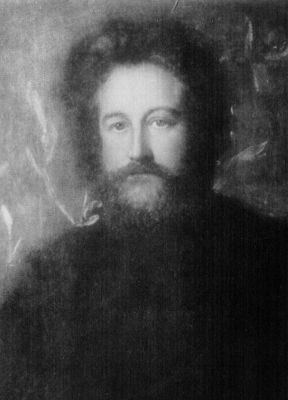
William Morris

- William Morris
- Tony Mortimer
- Fabrice Muamba
- Frank Muir, writer and radio personality
- Jimmy Neighbour
- Grant Nelson, radio DJ, went to school in Chingford
- Peter Nicol, MBE
- Michael Nyman, composer and musicologist
- Ronnie O'Sullivan
- Cornelia Parker
- Grayson Perry, ceramicist and 2003 Turner Prize winner, has his studio in Walthamstow
- Mark Petchey
- Pascale Petit, poet, twice shortlisted for T.S. Eliot Prize, lives in Walthamstow
- Eddie Phillips
- Leslie Phillips, comedy star of the Carry On Films, lived in Chingford
- Sol Plaatje
- Fred Pontin, founder and managing director of Pontins holiday camps
- Ruth Rendell
- Lt.Col V.C. 'Dope' Richmond, designer of the R101
- Tony Robinson
- Alliot Verdon Roe
- Jonathan Ross
- Paul Ross
- Ken Russell
- Pam St. Clement
- Nick Saloman
- June Sarpong, television presenter
- Graham Saville
- Baroness Scotland, Attorney General, grew up in Walthamstow and attended Walthamstow School for Girls
- Jamie Shea
- Teddy Sheringham, footballer, born on 2 April 1966 in Highams Park
- Rita Simons, British actress, singer and model
- Talvin Singh
- John Smith, avant–garde filmmaker, born in Highams Park, attended Selwyn Avenue School and George Monoux School
- Rodney "Gypsy" Smith, evangelist
- Vivian Stanshall, musician, painter, singer, broadcaster, songwriter, poet and writer, best known for his work with the Bonzo Dog Doo-Dah Band, grew up in Grove Road, Walthamstow
- Seán Mac Stíofáin
- Meera Syal
- Thomas Griffith Taylor (1890-1963), Antarctic explorer
- Norman Tebbit
- Nicola Walker
- Michelene Wandor
- Peter Waterfield, born in Walthamstow
- Angela Watkinson, MP
- Michael Watson
- Douglas Webb, Dam Buster and photographer
- Geoffrey Wellum
- Danniella Westbrook, former EastEnders star lives in Chingford
- Joe Willock, footballer, midfielder for the English club Newcastle United F.C.
- Adam Woodyatt, English actor who plays Ian Beale in EastEnders, born in Walthamstow 1968
- Phil Woosnam
- Matthew Xia
- Dr Rashid Akhtar community worker
