= List of people from the London Borough of Lambeth =

The following is a list of people who were born in the London Borough of Lambeth, or have dwelt within the borders of the modern borough (in alphabetical order by surname):

- Tony Abbott, Prime Minister of Australia, born in Lambeth in 1957
- Michael Adebolajo and Michael Adebowale, two Islamists who murdered Lee Rigby
- Naveen Andrews, actor, born in Lambeth in 1969
- Muriel Angelus, actress, born Lambeth, 1912–2004
- Elias Ashmole, alchemist and collector died in Lambeth in 1692
- Winifred Barnes (1892–1935), musical theatre comedy actress and singer, born in Brixton
- William Blake, religious visionary, poet and artist
- David Bowie, singer, songwriter, multi-instrumentalist, record producer, arranger, and actor
- Ben Bryant, cricketer
- Henry Burton, cricketer, born in Lambeth in 1874
- Shane Byrne, 6-time British Superbike champion
- Kevin Campbell (1970–2024), footballer, born in Lambeth
- Jamal Campbell-Ryce, professional footballer for Carlisle United FC, born in Lambeth
- Phoebe Carlo (1874–1898), actress, born in Lambeth
- Loyle Carner (born 1994), musician
- Charlie Chaplin, film actor and comedian, spent his early life in Lambeth
- Graham Chidgey (born 1937), cricketer
- Simon Cowell, television personality, born in Lambeth
- Joy Crookes, singer-songwriter, born in Lambeth
- Helen Hoppner Coode, Punch's first woman cartoonist
- Karamoko Dembele (born 2003), footballer
- John Doulton and Sir Henry Doulton, founded pottery company Royal Doulton in Lambeth
- John Dimmer, lieutenant colonel, recipient of the Victoria Cross in 1914.
- Aubrey Fair, footballer who played mainly as a left-back for West Ham United
- Kieran Gibbs, professional footballer, currently playing for Inter Miami, born in Lambeth
- Christopher Newman Hall, founded the Christ Church complex in Lambeth of which only the Lincoln Memorial Tower survives
- William Henry Hann, viola player, head of a musical family that performed in Brixton, 1886-96
- Henrietta Hodson, Victorian actress and theatre manager was born in Upper Marsh, Lambeth in 1841.
- Catherine Howard, Queen of England, born c.1521-1526
- Ken Livingstone, former London Mayor, born in Lambeth in 1945
- Rob Lord, composer of music for films, TV and computer games
- Archie Madekwe, actor; born in Lambeth
- Pat Marsh, secretary of the British Ice Hockey Association, born in Brixton
- Geoff Marshall, video producer and presenter; born in Lambeth
- Ephron Mason-Clark, footballer for Coventry City FC
- W. Somerset Maugham, completed his training in obstetrics in Lambeth and used that experience as the basis for his novel Liza of Lambeth
- Stella McCartney, English fashion designer
- Carl McCoy, frontman for gothic rock band Fields of the Nephilim, born there in 1963
- F. B. Meyer, pastored Christ Church in Lambeth
- William Chester Minor, major contributor to the Oxford English Dictionary; while living at Lambeth, he murdered George Merrett, for which crime he was found criminally insane and confined for the rest of his life at Broadmoor.
- Chris Murtagh (born 1984) cricketer who has played for Surrey County Cricket Club, the Reigate Priory Llamas and Shropshire County Cricket Club
- Tim Murtagh (born 1981), international cricketer who has played for the Ireland national cricket team, Middlesex County Cricket Club, Surrey County Cricket Club and the Reigate Priory Llamas in the Surrey Championship
- John Nash, architect and urbanist, born in Lambeth in 1752
- Annabelle Neilson (1969–2018), socialite, born in Lambeth
- Akai Osei, street dancer; winner of Got To Dance; born in Lambeth
- Scott Parker, manager of Burnley F.C, born in Lambeth
- Conrad Phillips, actor (1925–2016)
- Shirley Pitts (1934–1992), English fraudster and thief, the "queen of shoplifters", born on the Lambeth Walk
- Guy Pratt, bass guitarist, born in Lambeth
- Elliot Rodger, perpetrator of the Isla Vista attacks, born in Lambeth in 1991
- Frederick Ruffell (born 1997), cricketer
- Tony Selby (1938–2021), actor played Corporal Marsh in the comedy series Get Some In (ITV 1975 to 1978); starred in Eastenders; Doctor Who, The Good Life, and Bless This House.
- Katie Seymour, Gaiety Theatre dancer, Lambeth resident
- Charlie Smirke, Derby-winning jockey, born in Lambeth
- James Stephen, undersecretary of state for the colonies (1836–1847)
- Sir Arthur Sullivan, composer of the Gilbert and Sullivan operas, born in Lambeth in 1842
- Edward Thomas, poet, born in Lambeth
- Michael Thomas (footballer, born 1967), born in Lambeth
- Arthur Tooth, ritualist clergyman in the Church of England, curate of St. Mary's Lambeth in 1863
- Harriet Vernon, music hall performer and principal boy; born in Lambeth in 1858
- Carl Wheatle (born 1998), basketball player
- Peter Whittle (born 1961), politician, author, journalist and broadcaster, born in Lambeth
