= F. B. Meyer =

English Baptist pastor and evangelist (1847–1929)

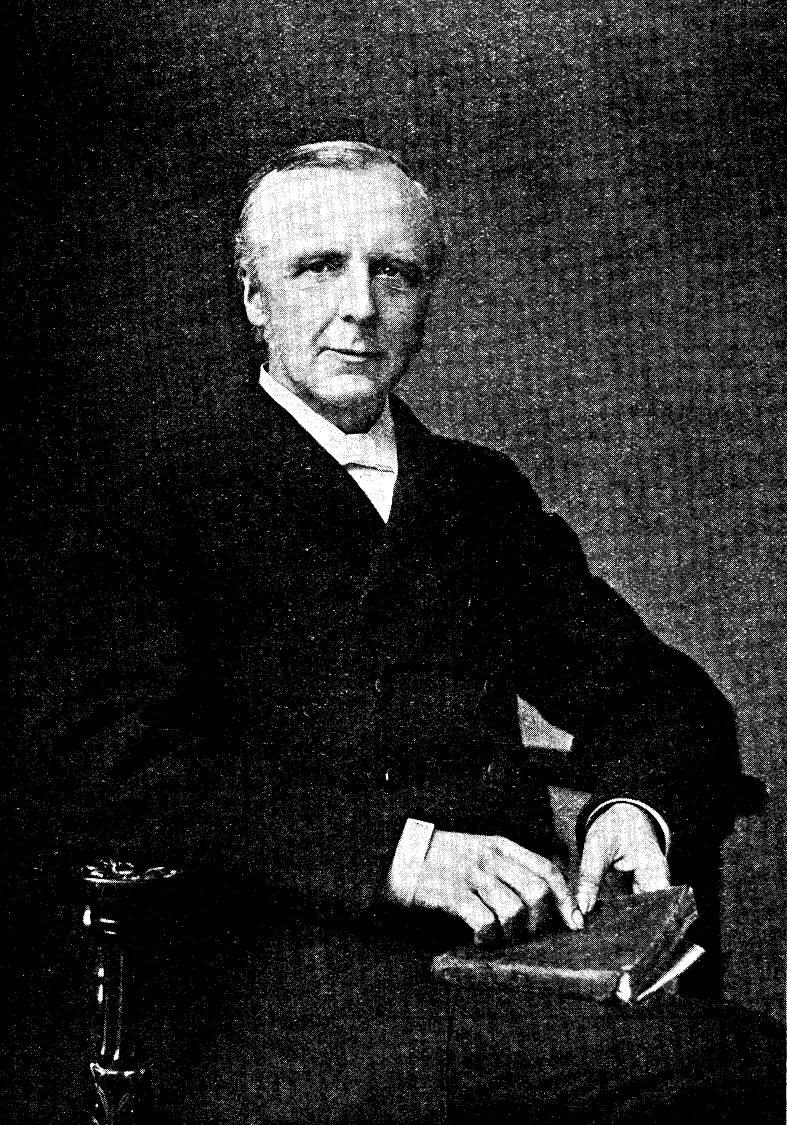
F. B. Meyer, c. 1899

Frederick Brotherton Meyer (8 April 1847 – 28 March 1929), a contemporary and friend of D. L. Moody and A. C. Dixon, was a Baptist pastor and evangelist in England involved in ministry and inner city mission work on both sides of the Atlantic. Author of numerous religious books and articles, many of which remain in print today, he was described in an obituary as The Archbishop of the Free Churches.

== Introduction ==
Frederick Meyer was born in London. He attended Brighton College and graduated from the University of London in 1869. He studied theology at Regent's Park College.

Meyer was part of the Higher Life movement and preached often at the Keswick Convention. He was known as a crusader against immorality. He preached against drunkenness and prostitution. He is said to have brought about the closing of hundreds of saloons and brothels.

While in York in the early 1870s F. B. Meyer met the American evangelist Dwight L. Moody, whom he introduced to other chapels, churches, and ministers in England, and by exchange was invited to make several trips to minister in America. The two preachers became lifelong friends.

Meyer played an important part in the beginnings of the Welsh revival, holding Keswick meetings in Wales in 1903 at which Evan Roberts, among others, pledged to spend at least one day a month praying for revival.

In 1908, Meyer and his wife made a tour of South Africa, where they met Mohandas Gandhi spending several days with him in May. Meyer expressed a cautious sympathy with Gandhi's movement of passive resistance.

In June 1916, together with Hubert Peet, a Quaker, he visited British conscientious objectors in France, to report upon their position in the light of news that 42 resisting men had been forcibly transported there. The visit took place shortly before 35 of the men were court-martialled and formally sentenced to death, but immediately reprieved.

F. B. Meyer wrote over 75 books, including Christian biographies and devotional commentaries on the Bible. In 1918, Meyer, along with seven other clergymen, was also a signatory to the London Manifesto asserting that the Second Coming was imminent.

An illustrated biography of his life was published in 1929, with a new edition a few years later. 2007 saw the release of a new biography of Meyer, F.B. Meyer: If I had a hundred lives, written by Professor Bob Holman and published by Christian Focus Publications.

== Associated chapels ==
Meyer began pastoring churches in 1870; his first pastorate was at Pembroke Baptist Chapel in Liverpool, his second at Priory Street Baptist Church in York, 1872. Other chapels and churches he pastored were:

- Victoria Road Church in Leicester (1874–1878)
- Melbourne Hall in Leicester (1878/80-1888) - founded by Meyer
- Regent's Park Chapel in London (1888–1892 and 1909–1915)
- Christ Church in London (1892–1909 and 1915–1921)

Of these, Melbourne Hall and Christ Church are perhaps most closely associated with his independence of approach.

Melbourne Hall, Leicester : Melbourne Hall has been described as F. B. Meyer's abiding monument; it was initiated in 1878 as a 'Church of Christ' with a small band of believers who fund-raised for, built, and opened the premises in 1880. As an entirely new, independent venture, designed to evangelise the people lying outside ordinary Christian agencies as a local mission, with every member a 'worker' active in the local community, it was decided not to name it a 'chapel' or a 'church', nor a 'tabernacle', and not the old nonconformist term of 'meeting house'; but simply a 'hall'.

Meyer's mission centre attracted great interest - visitors included national figures such as Hudson Taylor as well as local people; Melbourne Hall became a centre as well as a sphere. All sorts of people visited... it became, in fact, the Church of the Cordial Welcome, and as a consequence a place of pilgrimage and a centre of evangelical and missionary influence in Leicester and far beyond. His 'Farewell Meeting' in 1888 was presided over by the Mayor of Leicester.

Meyer nevertheless decided to move on to other pastorates in London - Regent's Park Chapel and Christ Church.

Christ Church, London : In 1892, Christopher Newman Hall was due to retire from the Christ Church complex in Lambeth, and invited Meyer to leave the Baptist's Regent's Park Chapel and its wealthy church-going district, to become his successor at the non-denominational institution, the successor to Rowland Hill and James Sherman's Surrey Chapel from where many welfare societies and services operated for the largely working class and slum district. Meyer wrote to his people at Regent's Park Chapel Shall I devote the remaining years of my manhood to the service of a section of the Church of Christ, or accept a position that is equally in touch with all sections of Evangelical Christians ? and after careful consideration, and successfully negotiating that a Baptistery would be provided, he decided to take on the role. Meyer left Regent's Park Chapel and entered upon his new charge in September 1892.

This being the year that Charles Spurgeon died, leading to unrest at the nearby baptist Metropolitan Tabernacle, Meyer was able to attract a considerable number of its former members to migrate to Christ Church. Frederick Meyer stayed there until 1902, when Dr. A. T. Pierson was asked to undertake his duties during two prolonged periods of travel abroad. Returning from his sabbaticals to Christ Church, Meyer continued as its pastor until 1909. In September of that year he returned to Regent's Park Chapel for nearly 6 years, coming back to Christ Church as sole minister from May 1915 until 1921.

== Final days ==
Frederick Meyer spent the last few years of his life working as a pastor in England's churches, but still made trips to North America, including one he made at age 80 (his earlier evangelistic tours had included South Africa and Asia, as well as the United States and Canada). A few days before his death, Meyer wrote the following words to a friend:

I have just heard, to my great surprise, that I have but a few days to live. It may be that before this reaches you, I shall have entered the palace. Don't trouble to write. We shall meet in the morning.

Following F. B. Meyer's death in 1929, an English newspaper, The Daily Telegraph, described him as The Archbishop of the Free Churches. Across the Atlantic, he had earlier been described in The New York Observer as a man of international fame whose services are constantly sought by churches over the wide and increasing empire of Christendom. In 2007 Stephen Timms wrote of him as a man with enduring popularity, dubbed virtually a Christian socialist.

== Works ==
- Israel: a Prince with God - The Story of Jacob Re-Told (1887)
- Christian Living (1888)
- Elijah and the Secret of His Power (1888)
- The Shepherd Psalm (1889)
- Abraham: The Obedience of Faith (1890)
- John the Baptist (1890)
- The Prophet of Hope: Studies in Zechariah (1890)
- Joshua and the Land of Promise (1893)
- Moses: The Servant of God (1893)
- The Way Into the Holiest: Expositions on the Epistle to the Hebrews (1893)
- Christ in Isaiah (1895)
- David: Shepherd, Psalmist, King (1895)
- The Secret of Guidance (1896)
- A Castaway, and other addresses (1897)
- A Good Start (1897)
- Love to the Uttermost (1897)
- Paul: A Servant of Jesus Christ (1897)
- Saved and Kept: Counsels to Young Believers and Christian Endeavourers (1897)
- Our Daily Homily (1898)
- Tried by Fire (1900)
- Back to Bethel: Separation from Sin, and Fellowship with God (1901)
- Jottings and Hints for Lay Preachers (1903)
- In Defence of the Faith (1907)
- A Winter in South Africa (1908)
- Peter: Fisherman, Disciple, Apostle (1919)
- Samuel: The Prophet (prior to 1924)
- The Gospel of John (1950?)
- Expository Preaching; Plans and Methods
- Joseph: Beloved-Hated-Exalted

== Sources ==
- Fullerton, W.Y. (1929) F.B.Meyer: a biography, London:Marshall, Morgan, Scott
- Cowman, Lettie B. (1933) Consolation, Los Angeles:Oriental Missionary Society
- Holman, Bob (2007) F.B.Meyer: if I had a hundred lives, London:Christian Focus
