= Lincoln Memorial Tower =

Tower in Lambeth, London, England

Coordinates: 51°29′54″N 0°06′43″W

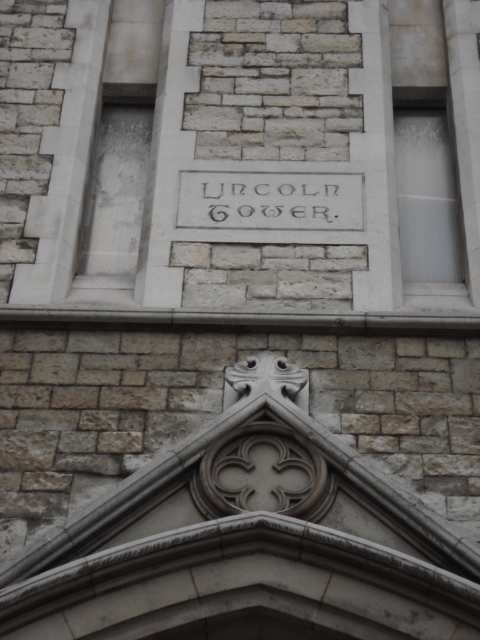
Name plaque of the Lincoln Tower above the original entrance in Westminster Bridge Road

The Lincoln Memorial Tower or Lincoln Tower is a Gothic Revival tower in Lambeth, London, housing small meeting rooms, that was opened in 1876 in memory of Abraham Lincoln, and paid for partly by Americans. Once part of a complex of nineteenth-century philanthropic institutions sited alongside a Congregational chapel, it is all that now remains of the original design. It is located at the corner of Westminster Bridge Road and Kennington Road close to Waterloo station and Lambeth North tube station in London, and is today a listed building associated with, and close to, Christ Church and Upton Chapel.

== Origins ==
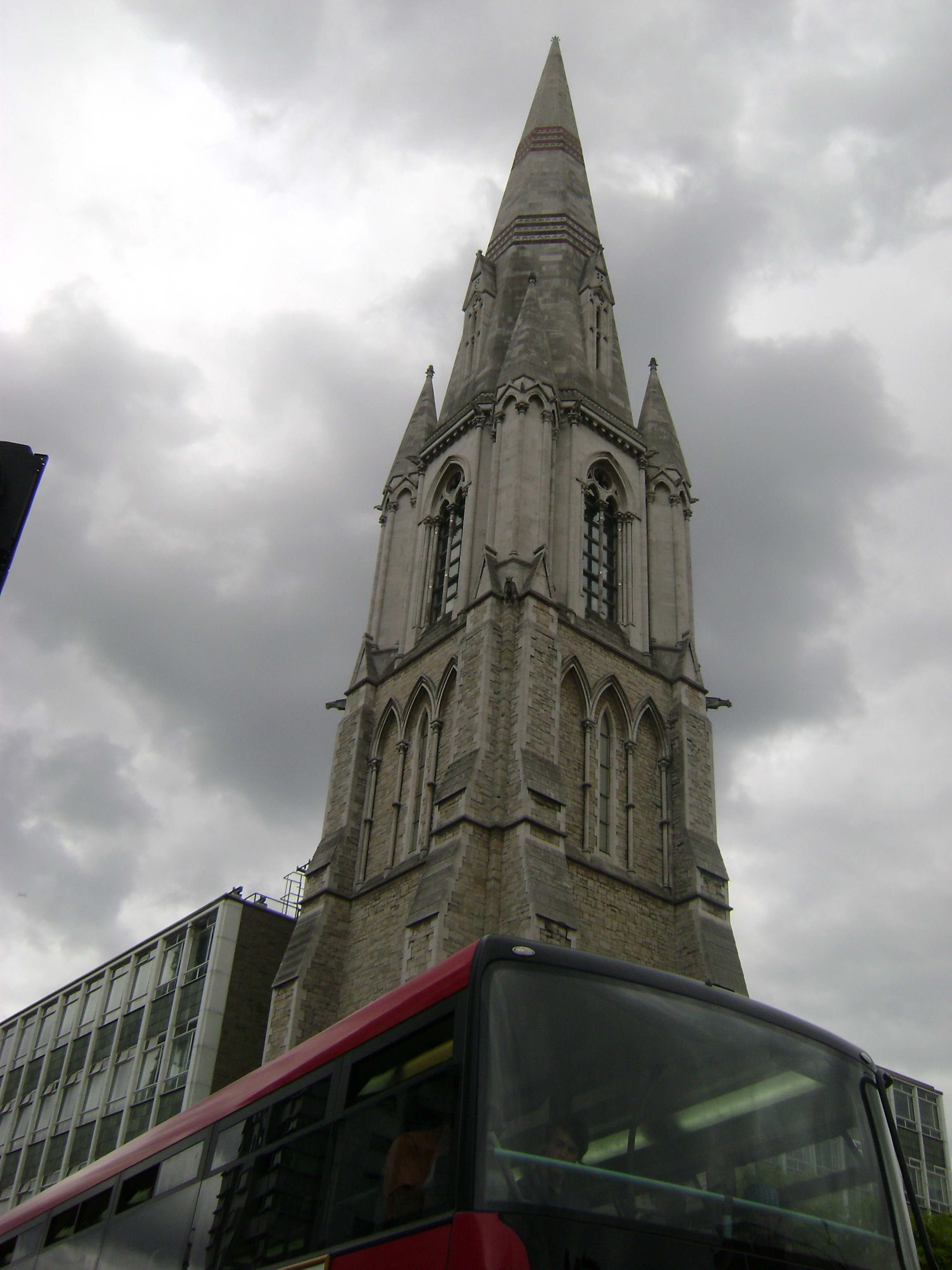
Lincoln Memorial Tower

The Lincoln Tower is built on the site of an orphanage for females, founded in 1758. When the orphanage closed in the mid nineteenth century, its site was acquired by trustees of the Surrey Chapel on nearby Blackfriars Road, whose own chapel lease was due to expire. This larger site provided them with ample opportunity to fund-raise not only for a new Congregational chapel which they named Christ Church, but also for a large complex of ancillary buildings.

The pastor of Surrey Chapel at the time was the energetic Christopher Newman Hall who had lectured and written extensively in support of Abraham Lincoln and abolition of slavery during the American Civil War. He raised funds in America for a permanent International Memorial in London, to Abraham Lincoln, and incorporated this into plans for redevelopment of the former orphanage site.

The Lincoln Tower was opened on 4 July 1876, the centenary of American independence. The foundation stone had been laid two years earlier, on 9 July 1874, by the American ambassador, Robert C. Schenck. The two main rooms in the tower were named the Washington and the Wilberforce rooms.

== Architecture and design ==
The original design by the architect E. C. Robins, developed in 1873, would have placed the tower and spire as an elevated structure above the centre of the new Congregational chapel. This was adapted in the final scheme by architects Paull and Bickerdike, who kept much of the original design and detailing of the building complex as a whole, but gave greater prominence to the Lincoln Tower. This became a stand-alone building with its own ground floor and entrances, though still integral to the complex. As more memorial funds were raised, the new architects, like E. C. Robins before them, added a lofty spire; raising the tower 200 feet high. The spectacular spire incorporated Robins' concept for an architectural version of 'stars and stripes' - the use of a polychromatic colour scheme of red and white stones.

On the Tower's north entrance, above the apex of a large archway, a stone was added bearing the title Lincoln Tower. Under the paved basement the coffin of preacher Rowland Hill was re-located from Surrey Chapel, with a tablet inset into the interior wall above. There was another tablet in memory of his successor, James Sherman, with a still larger tablet giving the name and purpose of the tower – to commemorate emancipation by the martyred Lincoln, the contribution of half the cost of the tower by American citizens, and as a pledge of international brotherhood.

The completed tower, built of Kentish ragstone outside and Bath stone within, and modelled on a Gothic style, was widely regarded at the time as one of the best examples of steeple and tower architecture in south-central London.

== Modern context ==
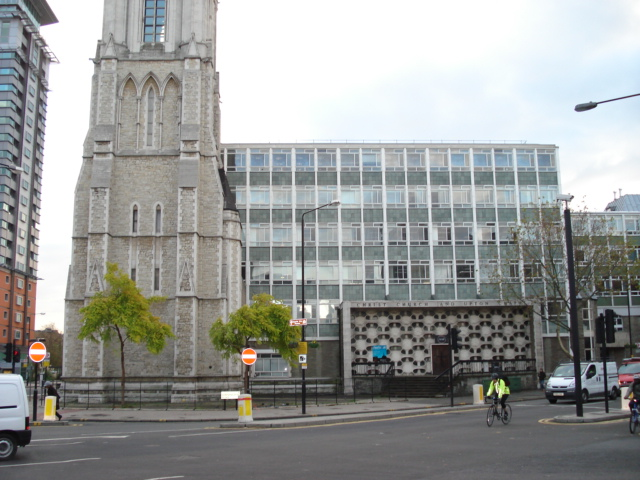
The Lincoln Tower within its contemporary setting – a modern office block and integral Christ Church & Upton Chapel

Much of the Christ Church complex was destroyed in the Second World War, although the Lincoln Tower survived. In the 1950s a large commercial office block, with an integral Congregational and Baptist chapel and community office space, was planned where the nineteenth-century Christ Church Congregational chapel and its school and meeting rooms (Hawkstone Hall) had stood.

Today, the complex, with its integral Christ Church and Upton Chapel form a modernist backdrop to the surviving Gothic Revival tower. The Lincoln Tower, as well as the chapel and adjoining community office space, are presently owned by United Reformed Church (as successors to the Congregationalists) and Baptists, and managed by Oasis Church Waterloo, part of the Oasis Trust charity. The chapel is also open as a cafe.

== See also ==
- Lincoln Memorial
- Abraham Lincoln Memorial Garden
- Abney Park Cemetery
- List of buildings and monuments honoring presidents of the United States in other countries
