= Chidgey =

Chidgey is a surname. Notable people with the surname include:

- Catherine Chidgey (born 1970), New Zealand novelist and writer
- David Chidgey, Baron Chidgey (1942–2022), Liberal Democrat politician in the United Kingdom
- Graham Chidgey (born 1937), former English cricketer
- Harry Chidgey (1879–1941), English first-class cricketer and Test match umpire
