= Samuel Ringgold Ward =

American journalist, abolitionist, minister (1817–c. 1866)

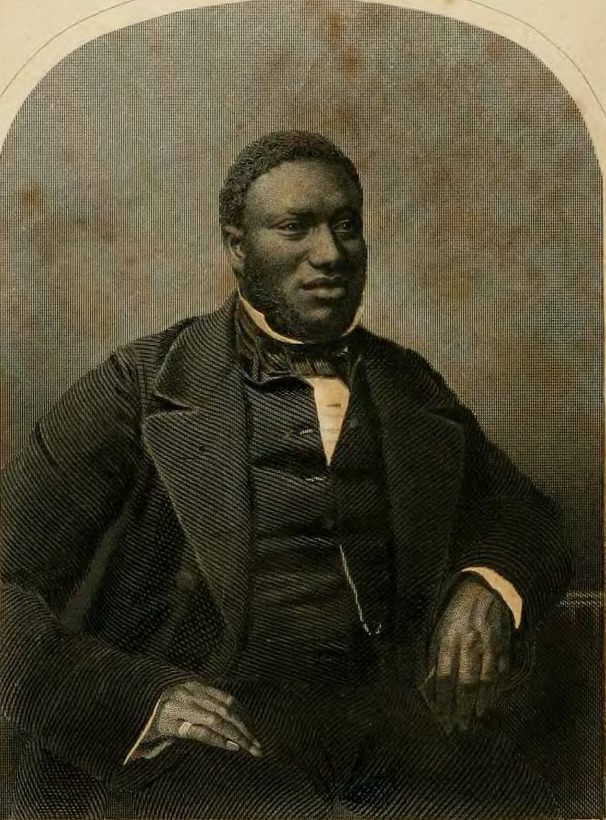
- Ward in 1855
- Born: October 17, 1817; Eastern Shore, Maryland, U.S.
- Died: c. 1866 most likely in Jamaica
- Education: African Free School
- Occupations: Abolitionist, newspaper editor, journalist, author, labor leader, minister

Samuel Ringgold Ward (October 17, 1817 – c. 1866) was an African American who escaped enslavement to become an abolitionist, newspaper editor, labor leader, and Congregational church minister.

He was author of the influential book Autobiography of a Fugitive Negro: his anti-slavery labours in the United States, Canada and England, written after his speeches throughout Britain in 1853. It enabled him to raise funds for the Anti-Slavery Society of Canada, where many escaped slaves from the USA were arriving in the 1850s.

== Early life ==
Samuel Ringgold Ward was born into slavery in 1817 on Maryland's eastern shore, the son of William Ward and Anne. In 1820, Ward and his parents escaped to New Jersey and soon relocated to New York in 1826. Once settled, Ward's parents enrolled him in the African Free School.

== Pastoral and abolition work ==
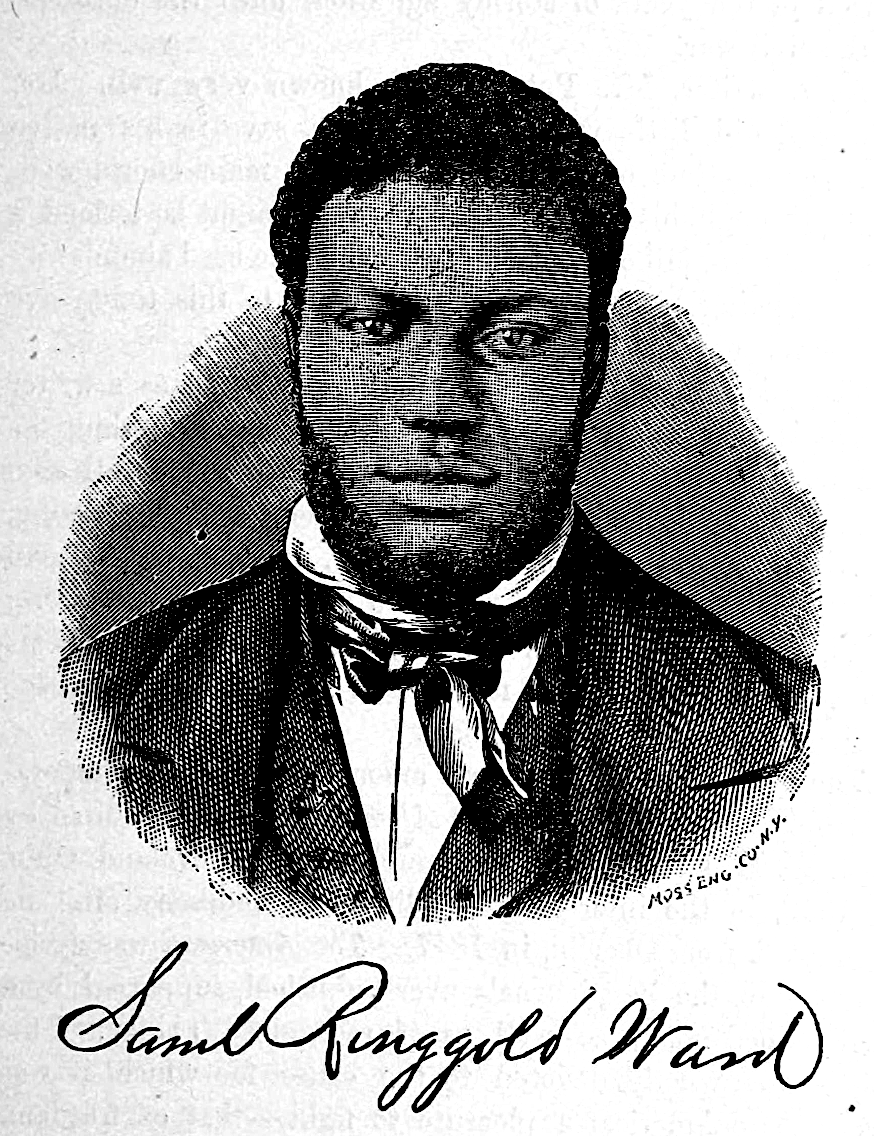
Ward in 1891

In 1835 Ward moved to Newark, New Jersey and taught school there until 1839. His beliefs in the end of slavery and his oratory skills led him to politics where he joined first the Liberty Party in 1840, where he remained until 1848, and later the Free Soil Party in 1848, becoming one of the few from the latter party that was interested in the abolitionist aspect of preventing further inclusion of slave states into the union. Indeed, at the Liberty Party National Convention in June 1848, Ward received 12 out of a possible 84 votes to place second in balloting for that party's nomination as their candidate for the office of U.S. vice president.

Other abolitionists, both white and black, were well aware of Ward's oratory abilities and commended his brilliant efforts in the abolitionist movement. His activities brought him in close contact with fellow orator and abolitionist Frederick Douglass, who said of him, "As an orator and thinker [Ward] was vastly superior to any of us" and that "the splendors of his intellect went directly to the glory of race."

Little progress had been made in America while he had been away and he was to record that "here I saw more of the foolishness, wickedness, and at the same time the invincibility, of American Negro-hate, than I ever saw elsewhere". While there, his youngest son, William Reynolds Ward, died and was buried; and two of his daughters, Emily and Alice, were born. From Cortland, the family moved to Syracuse, New York, in 1851. However, the stay was brief, on account of Samuel Ward participating in the "Jerry Rescue" on the first day of October in that year, leading him to emigrate in some haste to Canada that November.

During the last few years of Samuel Ward's residence in the United States he had become editor and part owner of two newspapers; the Farmer and Northern Star, and Boston's Impartial Citizen. He was a firm believer in the need for "anti-slavery labors, organizations, agitation, and newspapers" and conscious of the need to keep the papers from being censured, or worse as in the death of Elijah P. Lovejoy, he commenced the study of law.

== The first African-American labor leader ==
Freed blacks during the Antebellum also faced discrimination in employment, as black laborers were not welcome in most unions. In response, Frederick Douglass and Ward helped organize the American League of Colored Laborers, the first black American labor union. Assembled on June 13, 1850, in the lecture room of Zion's church in New York City, the League appointed Samuel Ringgold Ward as its first president, Frederick Douglass as its vice-president, and Henry Bibb as its secretary. Although short-lived and stymied by the small number of black workers in cities at the time, the union's goals included the creation of a fund to give loans to black entrepreneurs, the creation of a bank that would provide credit and encourage saving, and an industrial fair.

== Anti-slavery work in Britain ==
In Canada, he worked with Mary Ann Shadd Cary to found a newspaper, The Provincial Freeman, in 1853. While she was the editor-in-chief, as the first woman publisher in North America, she was afraid of not being taken seriously and originally hid her involvement with the paper by putting Ward's and the Rev. Alexander McArthur's names on the masthead.

"Proclaimed editor of this bold venture, Ward only lent his name to the newspaper to generate interest and subscriptions."

He was then offered work by the Anti-slavery Society of Canada, who decided he should visit Britain to further their anti-slavery work. He was given the names of contacts in London who would be keen to accommodate his visit, to strengthen their own long-standing anti-slavery work, and might be willing to help organise fund-raising for anti-slavery work in Canada.

Ward's preparation paid off and he was well received in Britain early in 1853; as Samuel Ward records:

The Rev. Thomas Binney, to whom I brought letters from Rev. Mr. Roaf, my pastor, received me most kindly. Mrs. Binney acted as if we had been acquainted for the preceding six-and-twenty years; and, being the first London lady with whom I had the pleasure of acquaintance, I saw in her what I have since seen in English people of all ranks, who are really genteel - a most skilful and yet an indescribably easy way of making one feel perfectly at ease with them. I cannot tell how it is done.

At the annual meeting of the Congregational Union, Samuel Ward was formally introduced to the body by the Secretary, Rev. George Smith of Trinity Independent Chapel, in company with Rev. Charles Beecher, the brother of Harriet Beecher Stowe, whom he had not met before. A dinner for the Congregational ministers and delegates was organised at Radley's Hotel, at which Samuel Ward gave his first London anti-slavery speech about the need for financial support in Canada:

The amiable Rev. James Sherman, at that time minister of Surrey Chapel, with his accustomed kindness took me in his carriage to the dinner; and afterwards, for four months, not only made me his guest, but made his house my home. I never lived so long with any other person, on the same terms. While I live, that dear gentleman will seem to me as a most generous fatherly friend.

Samuel Ward's visit to London was, he considered, at a most fortunate time for his fund-raising endeavour, because: "of the twofold fact that Uncle Tom's Cabin was in every body's hands and heart, and its gifted authoress was the English people's guest. For anti-slavery purposes, a more favourable time could not have been chosen for visiting England." As he further explained, "When Mrs. Stowe arrived in England... the book from the one side of the Atlantic, the address (by James Sherman) from the other side... awakened more attention to the anti-slavery cause in England, in 1853, than had existed since the agitation of the emancipation question in 1832." Ward, having met Mrs. Stowe at the house of Rev. James Sherman, next door to his Surrey Chapel on Blackfriars Road, in May 1853, was invited to stay at the Surrey Chapel Parsonage along with Mrs Stowe's husband, the Rev. Dr. Calvin Stowe, and her brother Rev. Charles Beecher, for three weeks.

On June 7, 1853, Samuel Ward was able to deliver his major London anti-slavery speech, and had secured Lord Shaftesbury to take the chair. Ward's address had a successful impact, for almost immediately—21 June—it led to the formation of a London Committee to seek financial support for the Anti-Slavery Society of Canada. The Committee comprised Lord Shaftesbury, Rev. J. Sherman, and S. H. Horman-Fisher, with G. W. Alexander its treasurer. This led to several months of hectic speaking engagements for Samuel Ward. He received invitations to speak at the London Missionary Society, kindred charities, and the pulpits of the most distinguished Dissenting divines in the land. Travelling in these causes took him to almost every county in England, and then on to Scotland. After just ten months, some £1,200 had been donated and it was possible to bring the organising committee to a close. A final, large meeting was held at Crosby Hall on March 20, 1854, chaired by Samuel Gurney, where Samuel Ward was accompanied by many of those who had helped him—Rev. James Sherman, Samuel Horman Horman-Fisher, L. A. Chamerovzow, Esq., Rev. James Hamilton D.D., Rev. John Macfarlane, and Josiah Conder.

Ward also delivered a speech in Leeds on October 11, organised by the Leeds Anti-Slavery Association, where large crowds required the intervention of the police.

Samuel Ward's success enabled the Anti-slavery society of Canada to finance its work in support of escaped slaves from the US, and in the following year, 1855 Ward published his influential book recounting all that he had achieved. The proceeds enabled him to retire to Jamaica, where he became involved in the Baptist church in Kingston. Not much was heard from Ward until early 1866 when he published a short pamphlet denouncing the leaders of the Morant Bay Rebellion only a few months before in October 1865 and supporting Governor Edward Eyre's actions putting down the rebellion. Ward's testimony taking the side of white colonists against Black Jamaican rebels demanding their rights has confounded historians ever since.

== Death and memory ==
Samuel Ringgold Ward died in c. 1866, after spending his last 11 years of life as a minister and farmer in Jamaica.

== Literature ==
- Richard J.M. Blackett: Samuel Ringgold Ward : A Life of Struggle, New Haven : Yale University Press, 2023, ISBN 978-0-300-25494-5
