= John Vine Hall =

English bookseller, known as a religious writer (1774–1860)

John Vine Hall (1774–1860) was an English bookseller, known as a religious writer.

== Life ==
Hall was born on 14 March 1774 in Diss, Norfolk, where his father had come down in the world. At 11 he was apprenticed to a schoolmaster who taught him the legal lands, then hired him out. In January 1786 he became errand-boy to a bookseller in Maidstone, and rose to be the chief assistant.

In 1801 Hall became clerk and traveller to a Maidstone wine merchant. He drank, and read Constantin Volney's Law of Nature and Tom Paine's The Age of Reason. In 1802 a friend lent him Beilby Porteus's Evidences of Christianity, and his views changed. In February 1804 he bought a bookseller's shop at Worcester, and moved there. In 1812 he became the subject of strong religious convictions.

In April 1814 Hall returned to Maidstone as proprietor of the bookshop where he had been errand-boy 28 years before. He became a total abstainer from 1818 and an advocate of teetotalism, and visited prisoners in the county gaol.

Hall retired from business in 1850, and in 1854 went to reside at Heath Cottage, Kentish Town, taking up religious and temperance work. He died on 22 September 1860, and his remains were interred in Abney Park cemetery.

== Works ==
In 1821 Hall conceived the idea for The Sinner's Friend. The first edition consisted of a series of selections from Karl Heinrich von Bogatzky's Golden Treasury, with a short introduction by Hall. It appeared on 29 May 1821. In subsequent editions he gradually substituted pages from his own for those taken from Bogatzky, until in the end the short work was his own with the exception of one extract. It quickly became an evangelical classic. It was translated into 30 languages, and sold nearly three million of copies.

== Family ==
Hall married, at Worcester, in August 1806, Mary Teverill.

His son was the preacher, abolitionist and writer Christopher Newman Hall.

Vine became an elder in Surrey Chapel, Southwark, where his son was minister.

== Notes ==
Attribution

This article incorporates text from a publication now in the public domain: Stephen, Leslie; Lee, Sidney, eds. (1890). "Hall, John Vine". Dictionary of National Biography. Vol. 24. London: Smith, Elder & Co.
