= Rowland Hill (preacher) =

English preacher and vaccination advocate (1744-1833)

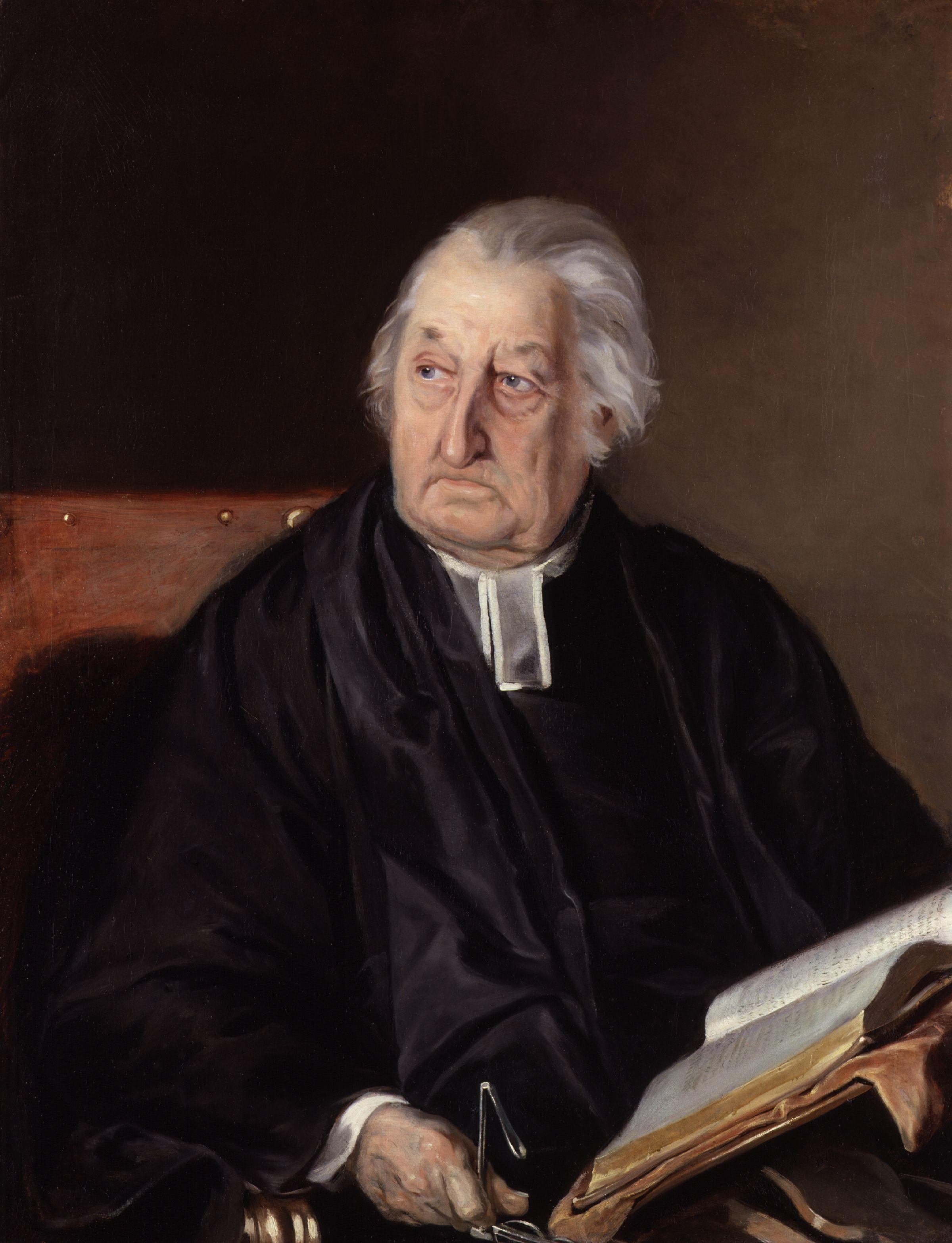
- Rowland Hill by Samuel Mountjoy Smith
- Born: 23 August 1744; Hawkstone Park, Shropshire, England
- Died: 11 April 1833 (aged 88); London, England
- Occupation: pastor
- Parent: Sir Rowland Hill

Rowland Hill (23 August 1744 – 11 April 1833) was a popular English preacher, enthusiastic evangelical and an influential advocate of smallpox vaccination. He was founder and resident pastor of a wholly independent chapel, the Surrey Chapel, Southwark, London; chairman of the Religious Tract Society; and a keen supporter of the British and Foreign Bible Society and the London Missionary Society. The instigator of penny postage, Rowland Hill (1795–1879), is said to have been christened 'Rowland' after him.

== Early life ==
Rowland Hill was born at Hawkstone Park (11 miles from Shrewsbury), Shropshire, 23 August 1744, the sixth son of Sir Rowland Hill, 1st Baronet (died 1783), he was educated at Shrewsbury School, Eton College and at St John's College, Cambridge (B.A., 1769), where he came under the influence of the Methodists. For preaching in the open air in and around Cambridge without a licence, Hill was opposed by the authorities and insulted by mobs. Finally, after he had been refused ordination into the Church of England by six bishops, he was ordained as a priest by the bishop of Bath and Wells in 1773 and accepted the curacy of Kingston St Mary in Somerset and was domestic chaplain to Melusina, Countess of Chesterfield, but subsequently continued his vocation as an independent or nonconformist.

== Surrey Chapel ==
Having come into an inheritance through the death of his wealthy father, Sir Rowland Hill, he built his own free chapel, Surrey Chapel, in Blackfriars Road, London, which opened in 1783. The chapel's trust deed ensured it would not subscribe formally to the theological standpoint of any particular denomination. Despite Hill's own Calvinistic Methodist leanings, and a funding contribution towards his chapel from Selina Hastings, Countess of Huntingdon, the chapel was not a formal part of the Countess of Huntingdon's Connexion. Instead, it operated a relatively open door policy, attracting preachers from a range of denominations whilst also providing substantial facilities for non-religious meetings, and was operated by a Congregational form of management. Nonetheless, Hill provided the 'anchor' and personally preached to immense audiences when he was in London. During the summer months he would visit other parts of the country, preaching in Scotland and Ireland as well as England and Wales, frequently attracting large crowds.

Many benevolent institutions were established at the chapel or in the nearby district, including early Sunday schools. Enrollment in the latter steadily increased under Hill's successors, James Sherman and Newman Hall, reaching over 3,000 children by the 1860s. Hill was also one of the founders, and chairman, of the Religious Tract Society; and an active promoter of the interests of the British and Foreign Bible Society and the London Missionary Society.

Hill also wrote several hymns, including ‘Cast thy burden on the Lord’ and ‘Dear friend of guilty sinners, hear’.

== Smallpox vaccination ==
Hill was on close terms with Edward Jenner, the pioneer of smallpox vaccination, and promoted his own plans to inoculate the congregations he visited or preached to; he also published a tract on the subject in 1806 at a time when many medical men refused to sanction it. Later he became a member of the Royal Jennerian Society, which was established once the practice became accepted in Britain, India, the US and elsewhere. John C. Lettsome, an eminent Quaker physician of the day wrote to Hill commenting:

You have done more good than you imagine;
and for everyone you may have saved by your actual operation,
you have saved ten by your example;
and perhaps, next to Jenner,
have been the means of saving more lives than any other individual.

== Death and legacy ==
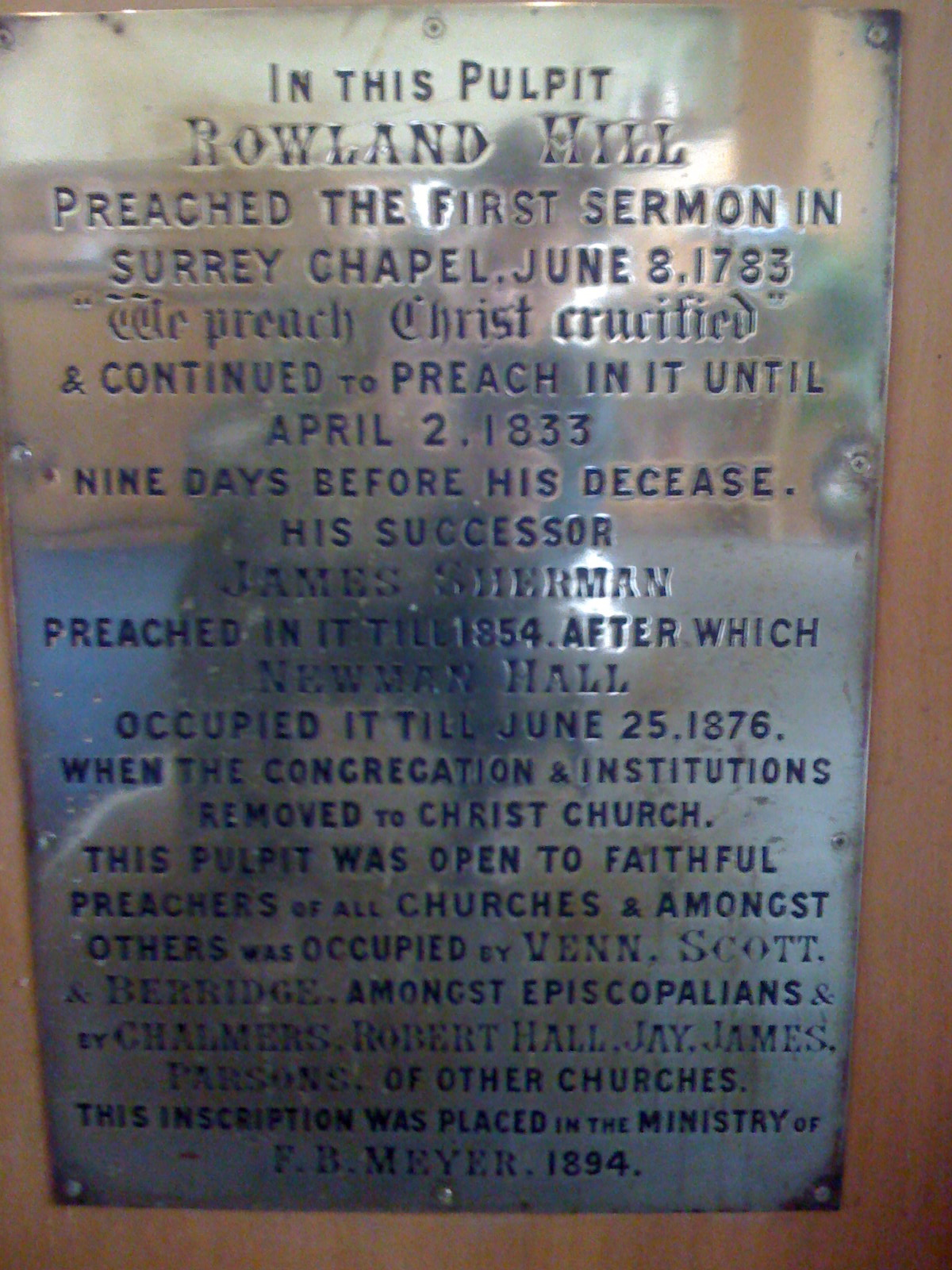
Pulpit plaque by Frederick Brotherton Meyer in Christ Church, Lambeth

Rowland Hill died in London on 11 April 1833 and was initially buried below his pulpit at the Surrey Chapel. He was succeeded at Surrey Chapel by James Sherman, whose tenure later passed to Christopher Newman Hall. Under Newman Hall, Hill's coffin was removed from Surrey Chapel and laid to rest at the Lincoln Memorial Tower, Westminster Bridge Road - part of a complex of Congregational buildings that included a new premises for the meeting hall named Hawkstone Hall which had been founded by Sherman in memory of Hill and his birthplace.

Hill's pulpit was also removed from Surrey Chapel when the congregation moved to Christ Church, Lambeth, and in later years a bronze plaque was affixed by Frederick Brotherton Meyer commemorating Hill and his successor. Christ Church was bombed during the Second World War, and the memorial plaque salvaged, to be re-erected in 1959 in the replacement building for Christ Church which stands today.

A portrait of Hill (Reference NPG 5397) by Samuel Mountjoy Smith in 1828 hangs in the National Portrait Gallery, London.

A Southwark Council housing block Rowland Hill House (1955) was named after him; the block is across the road from the site of his Surrey Chapel.

== Published works ==
- Hill, Rowland (1799). Journal of a tour through the north of England and parts of Scotland
- Hill, Rowland (1800). Extract from a Journal of a second Tour from London: The Highlands of Scotland and North-western parts of England. London: A. Paris
- Hill, Rowland (1801; 34th ed. 1839). Village Dialogues. London
- Hill, Rowland (1806). Cow-Pock Inoculation: Vindicated and Recommended from Matters of Fact (72-page pamphlet of religious sentiments about vaccination)

Religious titles
New title Chapel founded	Minister of Surrey Chapel; 1783–1833	Succeeded by Rev. James Sherman
