= William Gordon (physician) =

English physician (1801-1849)

William Gordon (1801–1849) was an English physician and Fellow of the Linnean Society of London, associated with Christian temperance and social causes in the English city of Hull in the early 19th century.

Gordon was born at Fountains Hall near Ripon, in Yorkshire, England on 2nd August 1800 and educated at the Grammar School in Ripon. On leaving school he was articled to a general practitioner at Otley. He further studied medicine at London and Edinburgh, and set up a medical practice at Welton in Northumberland. In 1832 he was elected a Fellow of the Linnean Society of London, and completed his M.D. in 1841.

Settling in Hull as a fully qualified physician, he became closely involved with Christian movements and as an active advocate of many of the claims put forwards by the working classes, became known as 'the poor man's friend'. His only child, Charlotte, was born at Welton in 1828. When only four years old he taught her elements of Latin and botany, and thought it a disgrace that the education of ladies should be merely that of superficial accomplishments, sending her to London for an education and writing to her every day enclosing botanical specimens. She was married at the Albion Chapel, Hull on 14 April 1846, to the chapel's Congregational pastor Christopher Newman Hall.

Towards the end of his life Gordon became president of the Hull Christian Temperance Society. His funeral sermon was preached in Albion Chapel, Hull by his son-in-law Christopher Newman Hall, and published. A public subscription monument was raised over his grave in his honour. An obelisk of white marble, it stood twenty-five feet high and was inscribed: Erected by public subscription, to William Gordon, M.D., F.L.S. - the People's Friend. Ob. Feb. 7 1849.
