= Aubrey Fair =

English footballer

Personal information
- Full name: Aubrey Claude Fair
- Date of birth: 26 August 1881
- Place of birth: Brixton, England
- Date of death: 4 December 1954 (aged 73)
- Place of death: Shoreham-by-Sea, England
- Position: Left-back

Youth career
- Russell Road

Senior career*
Years	Team	Apps	(Gls)
- South West Ham
1901–1907	West Ham United	31	(1)
- * Club domestic league appearances and goals

Aubrey Claude Fair (26 August 1881 – 4 December 1954) was an English footballer who played mainly as a left-back for West Ham United.

At age 14, Fair captained Russell Road schoolboys. He later played for South West Ham.

Fair never held a permanent spot in the first team at West Ham United. He made his Hammers debut in an FA Cup game at Leyton on 3 November 1901, but this was his only appearance that season. He made 12 appearances during the 1902–03 season. He featured seven times in 1903–04 and scored his only goal for the club on 17 October 1903, in a 3–2 loss to Brighton and Hove Albion at the Goldstone Ground. At the end of the campaign, the West Ham hierarchy reacted to what had been a poor season for the club and a purge of players was initiated. Fair was one of only five players to remain at the club.

He played ten games for the club in 1904–05, but didn't appear at all during the 1905–06 season. His last of 33 West Ham appearances was a 2–1 home win against Queens Park Rangers on 25 February 1907.
