= Newman Hall =

English Nonconformist divine

- Newman Hall; a Woodburytype photograph published in Men of Mark, 1877
- Born: 22 May 1816; Maidstone, England
- Died: 18 February 1902 (aged 85)
- Occupation: Nonconformist divine

Christopher Newman Hall (22 May 1816 – 18 February 1902), was an English preacher, abolitionist and writer. He was born at Maidstone and known in later life as a 'Dissenter's Bishop', was one of the most celebrated nineteenth century English Nonconformist divines. He was active in social causes; supporting Abraham Lincoln and abolition of slavery during the American Civil War, the Chartist cause, and arranging for influential Nonconformists to meet Gladstone. His tract Come to Jesus, first published in 1848 also contributed to his becoming a household name throughout Britain, the US and further afield, supposedly selling four million copies worldwide over his lifetime.

== Early life and the Albion Chapel ==
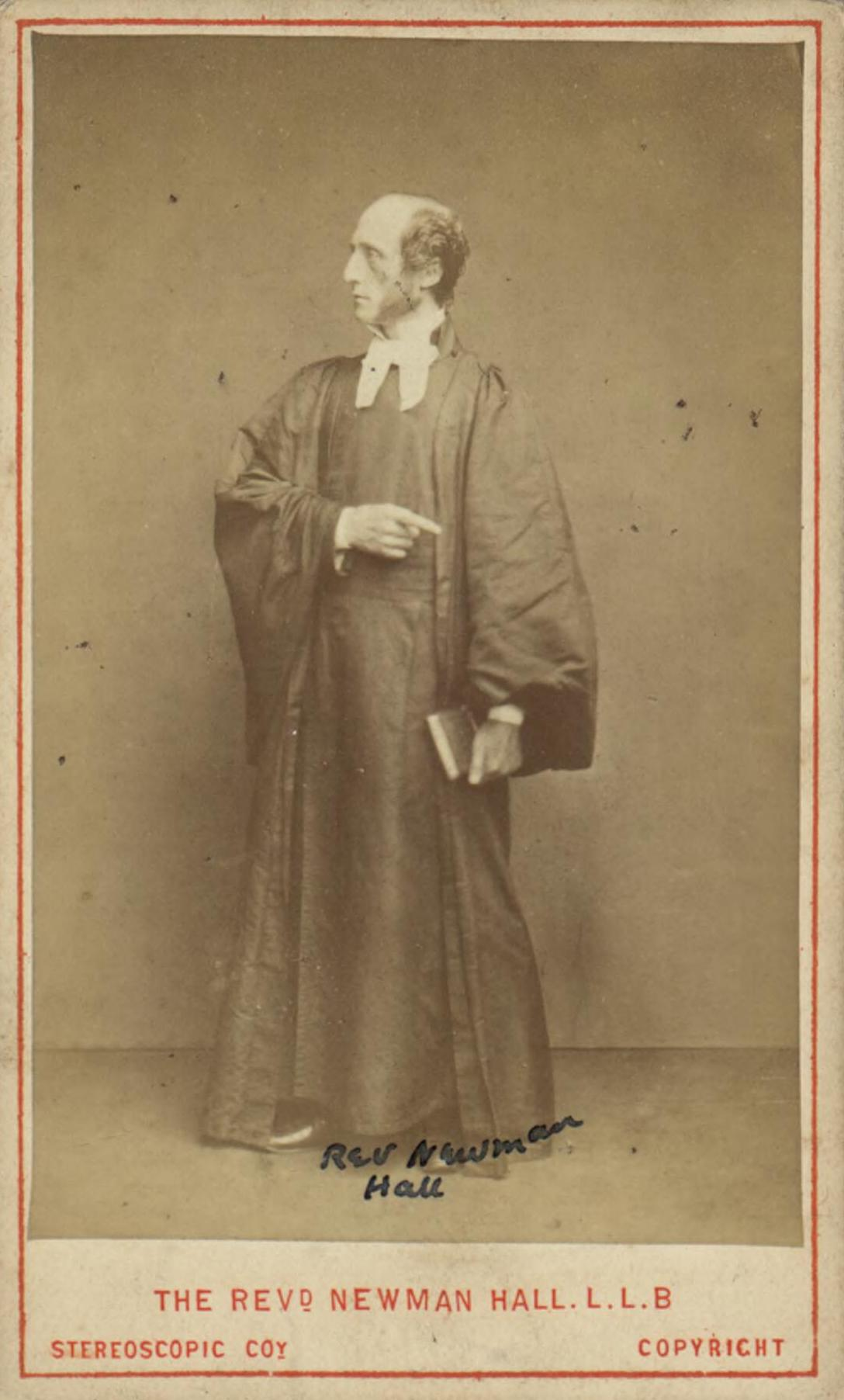
Photograph of Newman Hall taken c. 1865

Newman Hall's father was John Vine Hall (1774–1860), proprietor and printer of the Maidstone Journal, and the author of a popular evangelical work called The Sinner's Friend. Newman's first university degree was a London University BA in theology obtained at Highbury College, Middlesex in 1841. The following year he began his pastoral work at a Congregational chapel, the Albion Chapel, Albion Street, Hull. In 1843 he travelled through Scotland with a companion, where he found himself debating slavery with two American ladies who were slave owners themselves.

At Hull, Newman Hall engaged actively in social causes, including support for Chartism and temperance reform. To promote the latter cause he wrote The Scriptural Claims of Teetotalism, whilst his thoughts on Chartism and political causes, being influenced by the weekly Christian Socialist written by Charles Kingsley, Frederick Maurice and Thomas Hughes, was brought together in a small pamphlet entitled Divine Socialism, or The Man Christ Jesus. In 1846 Newman Hall married his first wife, Charlotte, only daughter of Dr William Gordon FLS, both of Hull.

In 1848 he published his most famous tract, Come to Jesus.

During the twelve years of his ministry at Albion Chapel, the membership increased greatly, necessitating a branch chapel. A school was also opened. His popularity led to invitations to preach at many of Yorkshire's Free Churches in Beverley, Selby, Leeds, Huddersfield, Filey, Harrogate, York, and Ripon.

== Surrey Chapel ==
In 1854 Newman Hall succeeded the Rev. James Sherman as pastor of the celebrated Surrey Chapel in London, which was founded in 1783 by the Rev. Rowland Hill and by now had numerous foundations and charities associated with it. Whilst ministering at the chapel, Newman Hall won a scholarship to study law in his spare time; he was awarded an LLB degree in 1856.

== Abolition and American Civil War ==
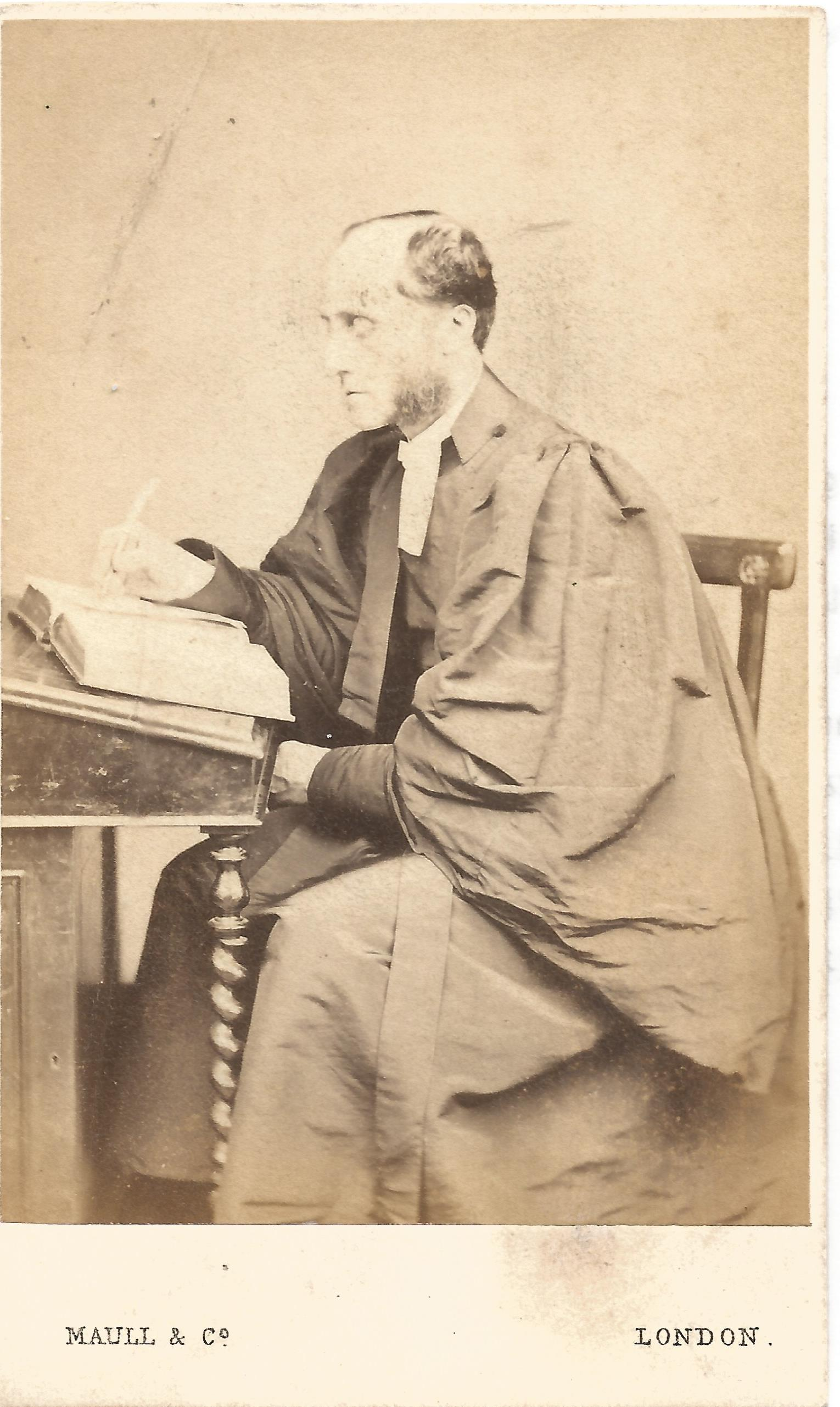
Carte de visite of Newman Hall taken c. 1865

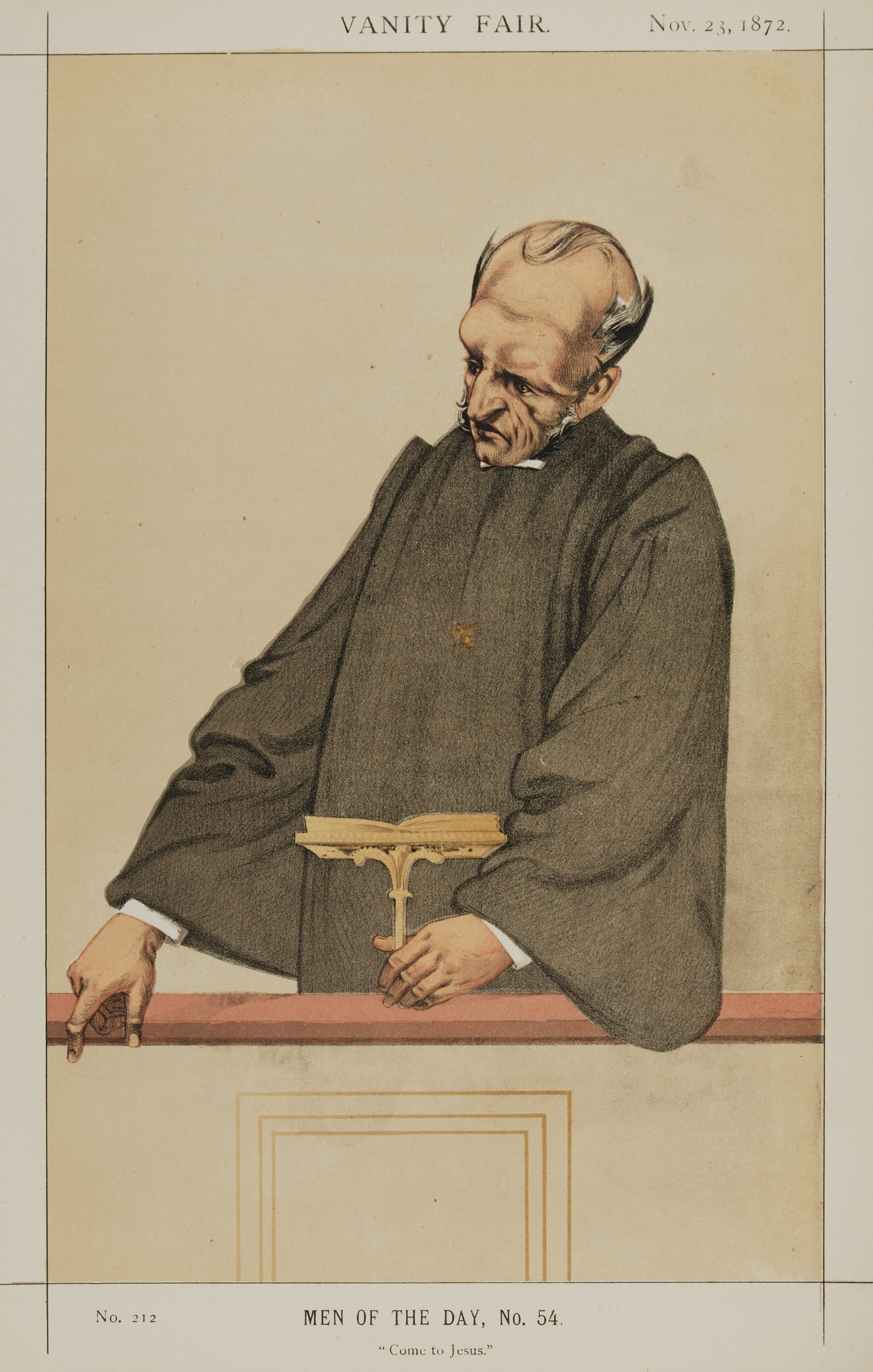
Newman Hall by Montbard in Vanity Fair, 1872

During the 1860s, dissenting from the British government's position, Newman Hall passionately supported the north in the American Civil War. He disapproved of secession by southern states. "England should side with the North", he wrote, "particularly because emancipation of the slaves is just". He felt so strongly that he published one of his few non-theological books: The American War. A Lecture delivered in London, October 20, 1862. Newman Hall visited the United States during the Civil War. He published a passionate anti-slavery speech co-authored by Abraham Lincoln and Henry Ward Beecher.

Hall gave the main speech at the Great Union and Emancipation Meeting at Exeter Hall, London, on 29 January 1863 in support of Lincoln's Emancipation Proclamation. The meeting was a huge success, showing support for abolition in the United States, and reported by Harper's Weekly to have been "one of the largest and most enthusiastic meetings ever held in London"; its overspill of people who could not get into the packed meeting itself, was formed into three large, ancillary, open-air meetings. Subsequently, Newman Hall made extensive tours in the United States. At Washington, he was invited to open Congress with prayer, and in the House of Representatives he delivered an address on international relations.

== Christ Church, Hawkstone Hall and Lincoln Memorial Tower ==
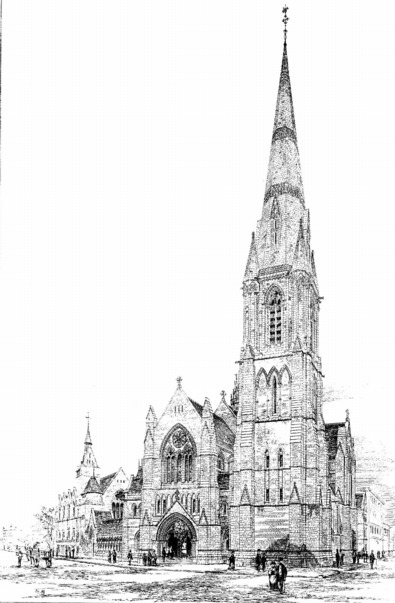
Christ Church in 1875

After some years at Surrey Chapel it became apparent to Newman Hall and the chapel's trustees that closure was inevitable. A considerable sum had been bequeathed by the chapel's founder for the perpetuation of his work on the expiration of the lease; but, owing to some legal flaw in the will, the bequest had to be given to the residuary legatee, Hackney Itineracy, later known as Hackney College, a non-conformist theological institution co-founded by George Collison. The trustees were faced with the prospect of raising all of the funds needed to buy a new lease on Surrey Chapel, or moving elsewhere.

Surrey Chapel on Blackfriars Road was by then a popular religious, educational, and music venue with many associated foundations and charities, but was too small to house all of these. To provide sufficient space, a local temperance hall in Waterloo Road had been leased, and duly renamed Hawkstone Hall - the country seat of relatives of Rev. Rowland Hill. Were a more spacious site found for an entirely new chapel, the trustees might provide on-site facilities for some of the foundations and perhaps acquire a freehold. Costly though this would be, Newman Hall was undaunted by this challenge. Through weekly offertories and donations, and fund-raising in America, he led a campaign to raise sufficient money and loans.

A grand building project emerged at the junction of the Kennington and Westminster Bridge Roads on the site of a former Orphan Asylum. It comprised a large new chapel, Christ Church, adjoined by a large lecture hall and school building to which the name Hawkstone Hall was transferred, and an international monument to Abraham Lincoln - the Lincoln Memorial Tower. The whole complex was initially designed by the architect E. C. Robins FRIBA in 1873, and then enlarged and modified by Paull & Bickerdike. Within four years of the new complex being opened by Samuel Morley MP in 1876, the total cost of about £60,000 was cleared.

== Later life, memorial and legacy ==
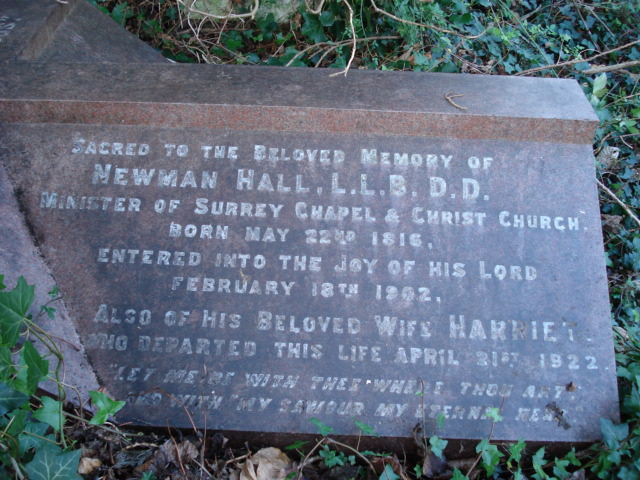
Memorial to Newman Hall and Harriet at Abney Park Cemetery London

In the 1860s Newman Hall became Chairman of the Congregational Union, and was awarded a Doctorate in Divinity from Amherst College in the US. Newman Hall became involved in W E Forster's educational bill and met with Gladstone personally. At a service conducted by Rev Henry Allon at Christ Church, on Easter Monday 1880, Newman Hall married his second wife, Miss Harriet Knipe - daughter of Henry Knipe, barrister-at-law and J.P. His first marriage had ended in a controversial divorce case which had eventually led to a decree nisi in February 1880 - a time when divorce was rare. Neither marriage was followed by children. In 1892 he received a second Doctorate of Divinity degree - from Edinburgh University.

In 1892 Hall resigned as pastor at Christ Church whilst continuing with his interests in social and evangelical work. Non-party, but broadly Liberal in his political views, few preachers of any denomination have exercised so far-reaching an influence. Towards the end of his life he completed an autobiography, in which he set out his philosophy in these words: "The Christian Church, as tribunes of the people should be ever ready to plead the people's cause...Christians should be in the forefront of the battle of philanthropy." By this time he had many books to his name, including two books on travel, The Land of the Forum and Vatican, and From Liverpool to St. Louis. He also published a book of poetry entitled Pilgrim Songs in Cloud and Sunshine.

== Family ==
Hall was married twice, firstly to Charlotte Gordon in 1846 (ending in divorce), and secondly to Harriet Knipe in 1880; he had no children.

Newman Hall is buried at Abney Park Cemetery in Stoke Newington with his father John Vine Hall (d. 1860), and wife Harriet (d. 1922), in a polished red coffin tomb.

According to Hall, his tract Come to Jesus sold more than four million copies during his lifetime. He further claimed that it was read by 100,000 Civil War soldiers, and that it sold 10,000 copies per year in Warsaw.

== Works ==
- Hall, Newman (1850/reprinted 2007). The Christian Philosopher... a narrative of the life of the late William Gordon. USA: Kessinger Publishing, 2007
- Hall, Newman (1858). Hymns composed at Bolton Abbey, and other Rhymes.
- Hall, Newman (1861). The Saviour's Bible. J. Nisbet & Company.
- Hall, Newman (1863/reprinted 2007). The American War. by Newman Hall, LLD. A lecture delivered in London October 20, 1862. US: University of Michigan Library, 2007
- Hall, Newman (1865/reprinted 2007). Sermon on the Assassination of Abraham Lincoln preached at Surrey Chapel, London, May 14, 1865. US: Cornell University Library, 2007
- Hall, Newman (1871). Pilgrim songs in cloud and sunshine. Hamilton, Adams & co.
- Hall, Newman (1898). Newman Hall, an autobiography. Cassell: London.

== Notes ==
Religious titles
Preceded by Rev. James Sherman	Minister of Surrey Chapel; 1854 – 1876	Congregation moved to Christ Church, Lambeth
