= Christ Church, Lambeth =

Church in South London, England

Coordinates: 51.49844°N 0.11191°W

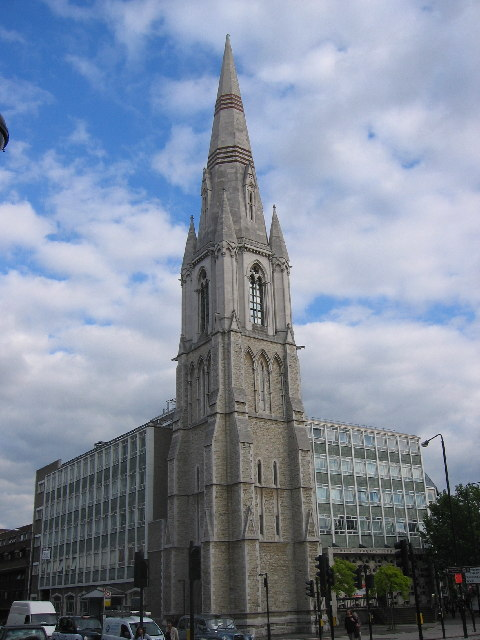
Christ Church in 2005

Christ Church, Lambeth, England, was founded by the Rev Dr Christopher Newman Hall in 1876 as a Congregational chapel, on Westminster Bridge Road. It drew its congregation largely from Surrey Chapel.

Christ Church formed part of a complex of new mission buildings, including the Lincoln Tower and a new premises for Hawkstone Hall. On Newman Hall's retirement, it passed to F. B. Meyer.

== The modern-day chapel ==
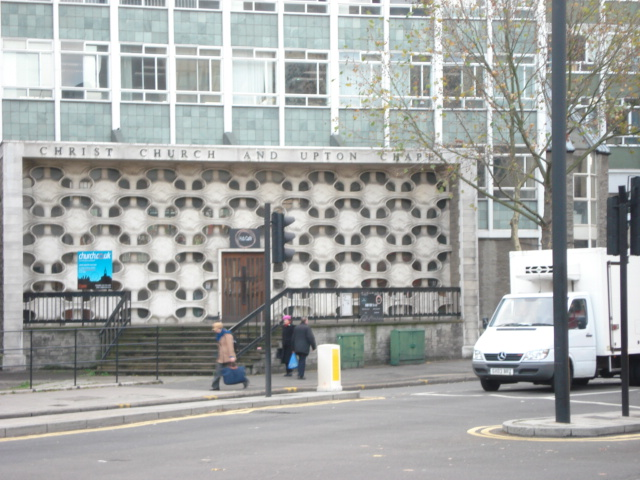
Christ Church & Upton Chapel (2008)

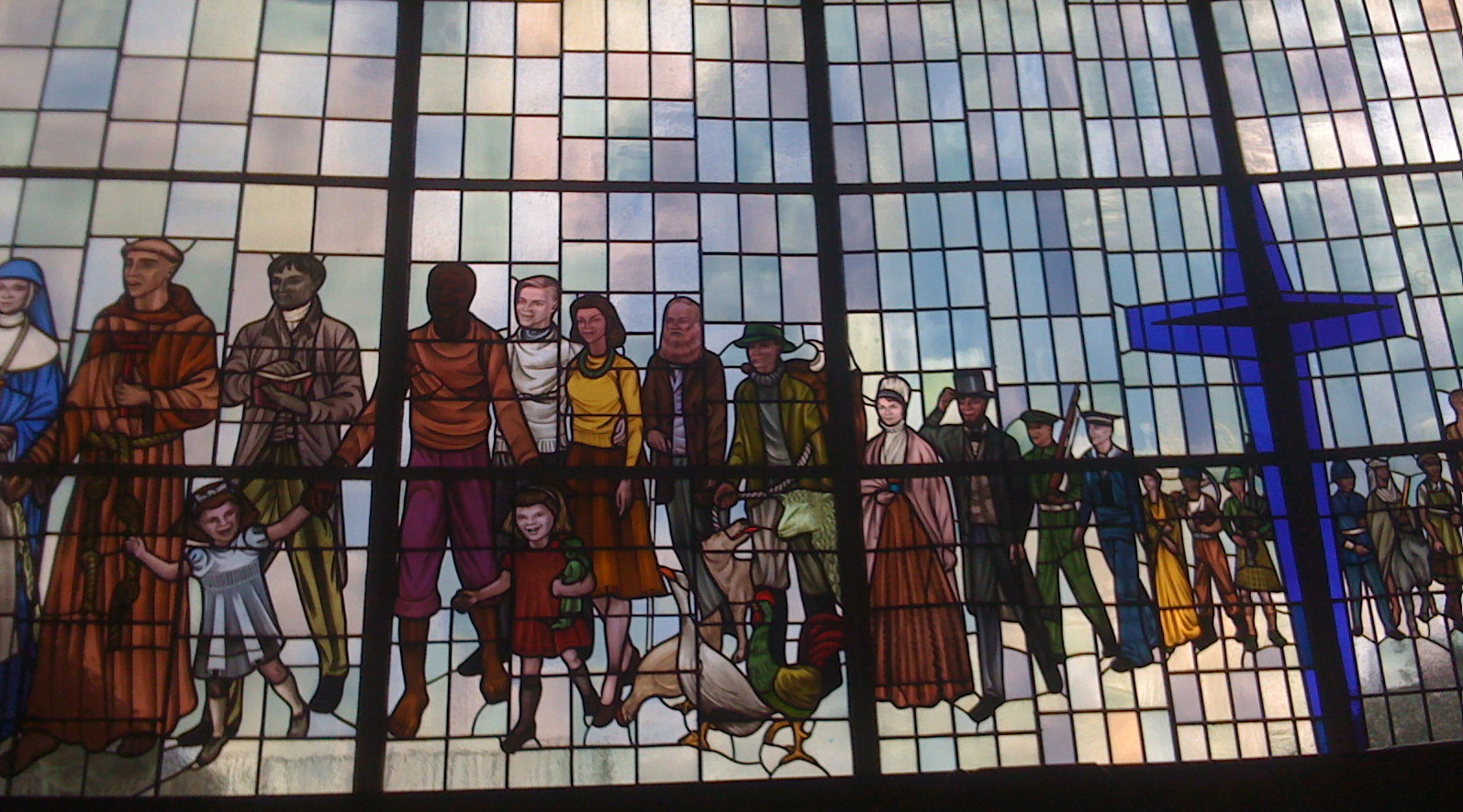
Stained glass window

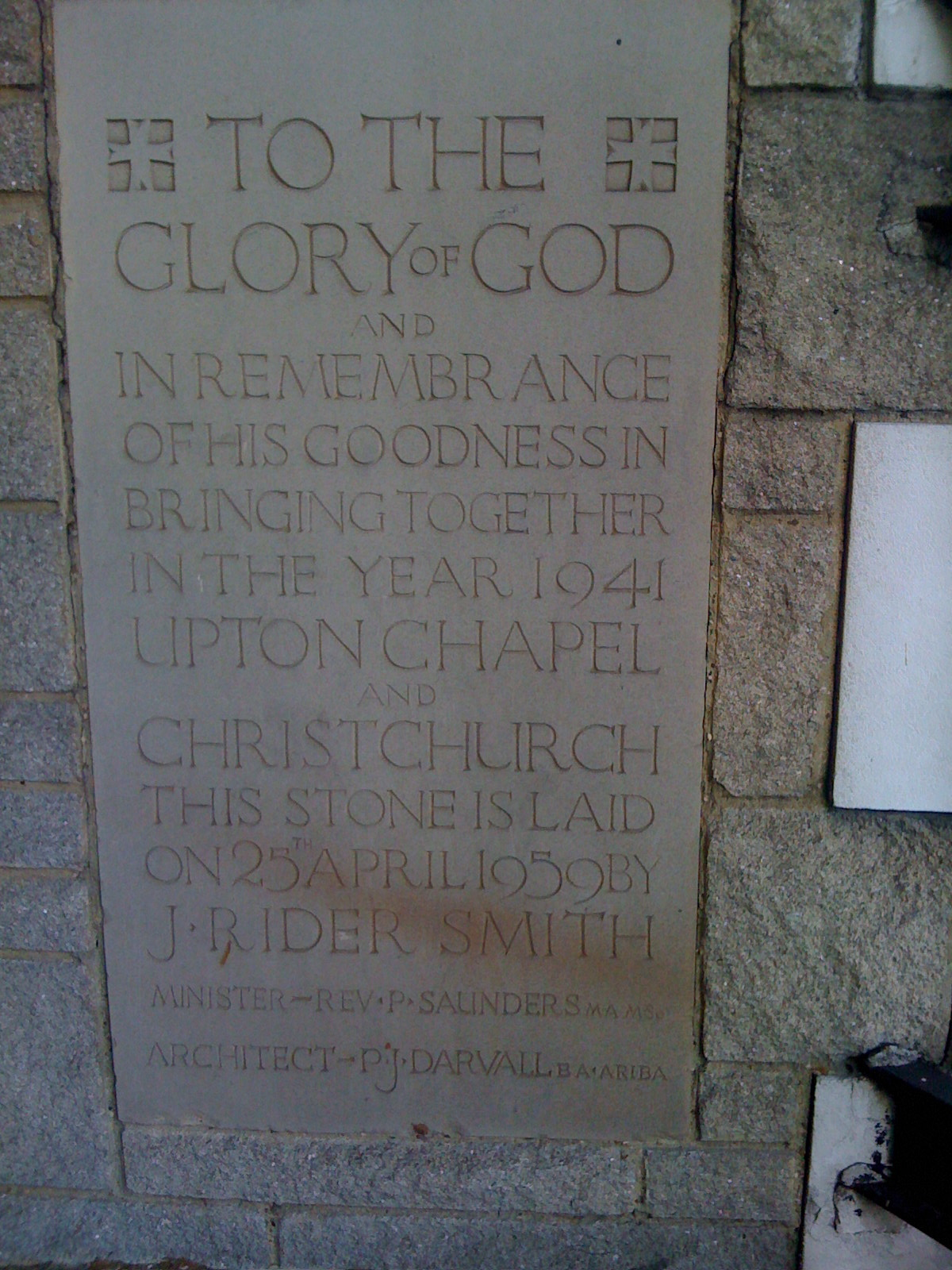
Foundation Stone, 1959

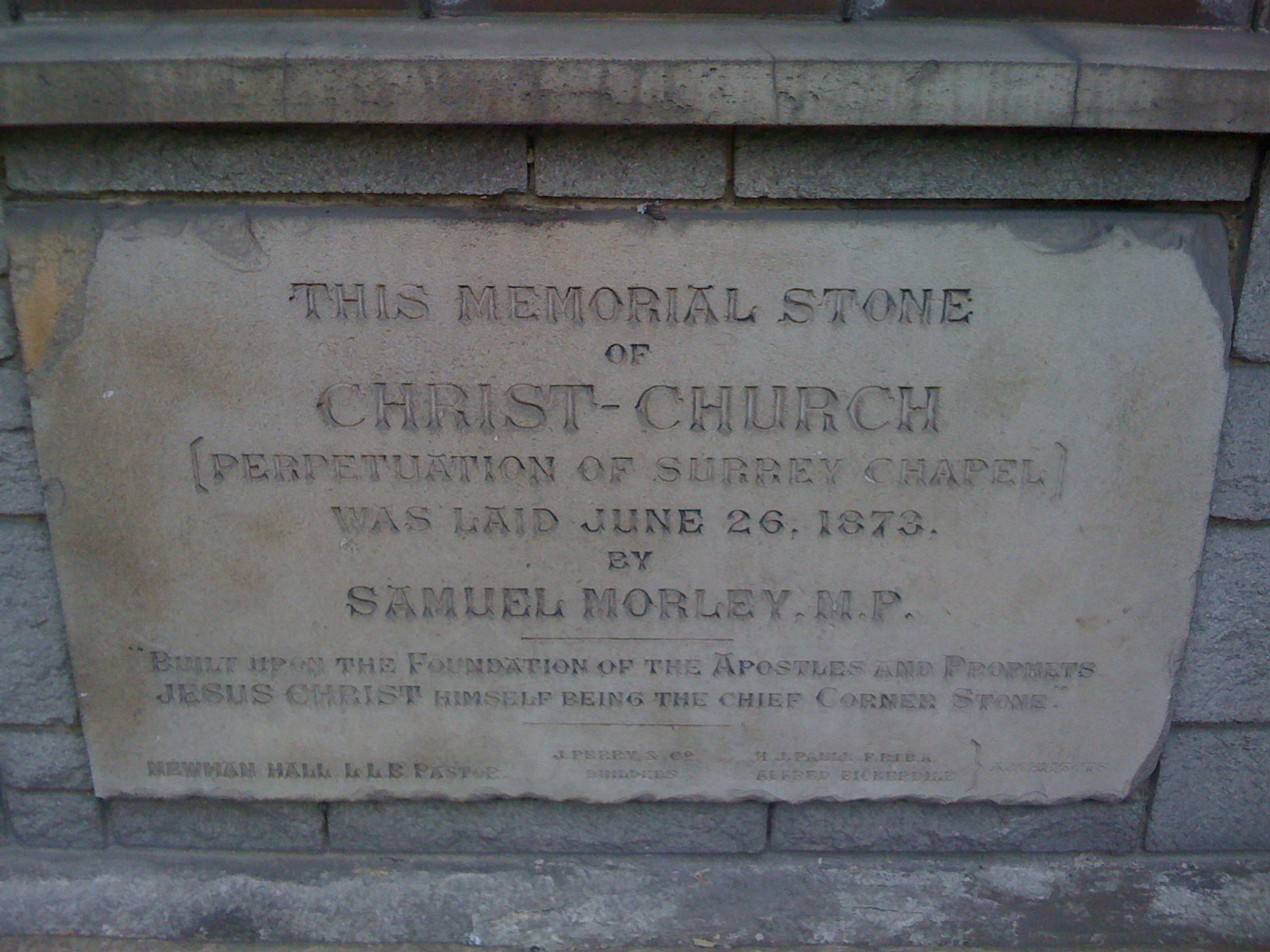
Foundation Stone, 1873

Christ Church was rebuilt on a smaller scale in the late 1950s and early 1960s, following the destruction of the original church during the Second World War, and was combined with Upton Chapel (Baptist), which had also been destroyed during the war (the Lambeth Road Upton Chapel had been built in 1862, providing a purpose-built chapel for baptist meetings that had been originated in 1785 by James Upton).

The chapel is now known, in this combined form, as Christ Church & Upton Chapel United Reformed, and more recently as Church.co.uk, Waterloo following its association with the Oasis Trust. The tower is occupied by Shiva Limited.

The chapel is inconspicuous, being integrated into an office block of a modernist architectural style. Its interior is used as a café as well as a chapel. Here, a plaque, dating from 1894, has been displayed – salvaged from the chapel built by Newman Hall. It reads:

In this pulpit Rowland Hill preached the first sermon in Surrey Chapel, June 8, 1783 'We preach Christ crucified' & continued to preach in it until April 2, 1833 nine days before his decease. His successor James Sherman preached in it till 1854, after which Newman Hall occupied it till June 25, 1876 when the congregation and institutions removed to Christ Church. This pulpit was opened to faithful preachers of all churches and amongst others was occupied by Venn, Scott and Berridge amongst episcopalians, and by Chalmers, Robert Hall, Jay, James, Parsons, of other churches.
This inscription was placed in the ministry of F.B.Meyer, 1894.

A stained glass window illuminates the chapel from the east. On the exterior of the chapel, a foundation stone records details its rebuilding in 1959. The architect was P. J. Darvall ARIBA, the minister was Rev. P. Saunders, and the stone was laid by J. Rider Smith. In between 2013 and 2014 the whole church site was converted into Oasis Academy Southbank, a secondary academy school, part of the Oasis Academy network. The chapel was converted into a sports hall. The stained glass window has been boarded up due to its out date depictions of black people and slavery.

== The Victorian chapel ==
The Victorian Christ Church was bombed during World War II, and only the adjoining Lincoln Memorial Tower remains. The original foundation stone of Newman Hall's Christ Church was salvaged after the war, and has been placed at the foot of the nearby Tower on Westminster Bridge Road. It reads;

This memorial stone
of
Christ Church
[perpetuation of Surrey Chapel]
was laid June 26, 1873,
by
Samuel Morley M.P.
'built upon the foundation of the apostles and prophets Jesus Christ himself being the chief corner stone'.
Newman Hall LLB pastor. J. Perry & Co builders. H.J.Paull FRIBA, Alfred Bickerdike, architects.

== See also ==
- List of churches in Lambeth
- Westminster Bridge Road
- Oasis Charitable Trust
