= E. C. Robins =

English architect and author

Edward Cookworthy Robins (1831 – 20 June 1918), known as E. C. Robins, was an English architect and author.

== Early life and background ==
He was the son of the businessman and canal carriage investor John Robins and his wife Mary Ann Snell, daughter of Richard Snell. His sister Jane Elizabeth Robins married the educator Henry Cook, as his second wife, and was the mother of Theodore Andrea Cook. She is known, under her married name, as an artist who exhibited at the Royal Academy, as a book illustrator, and for silhouettes. Edward Robins attended schools in Esher, Derby and London.

=== Snell & Robins, carriers ===
For a period in the early 1820s, Snell, Robins & Snell were one of the competitors to Pickford & Co. as Manchester–London carriers. John Robins, who married into the Snell family in 1814, was from a nonconformist background in Plymouth, and was a partner in the family firm by 1820.

Richard Snell senior, Richard Snell junior and William Snell junior were wharfingers and carriers in partnership at Paddington Basin until 1817. The canal carrier business of Richard Snell moved in 1819 to City Road Basin. A partnership of those three and John Robins, at West Paddington, was dissolved in 1820, with William Snell withdrawing; and Richard Snell senior then withdrew in 1821. The London Post Office Directory for 1820 mentions Snell, Robins and Snell, canal carriers, based at the White Bear Inn on Basinghall and 6 & 7, The Wharf, Paddington.

The canal carriers Snell & Robins took on Wharf 7 at the City Road Basin in 1823. In 1824 John Robins and Richard Snell were carriers at 87 London Wall. In 1825 they were managers of the London and Manchester Van Association. John Robins withdrew from the partnership on the last day of that year.

== Career ==
Robins studied under the civil engineer and artist Emile de Buck, and the architect Sancton Wood, and set up on his own in 1851. He won seven architectural design competitions in the period 1859 to 1874. Elected an Associate of the Royal Institute of British Architects in 1853, he became a Fellow in 1860. In 1870 he was elected a member of the Society of Arts, then at 16 Southampton Street, and 1878 a Fellow of the Society of Antiquaries of London. He acted as Surveyor to the Dyer's Company.

Robins came to concentrate on hospital design.

== Works ==
- 1863 consecration, St John's Church, Usk Road, Battersea. Competition winner, funded by the Incorporated Society for Building Churches. The church had closed by 1953; in 1939 its role as parish church had been taken over by St Paul's, St John's Hill (1868, Henry Edward Coe, now a nursery school).

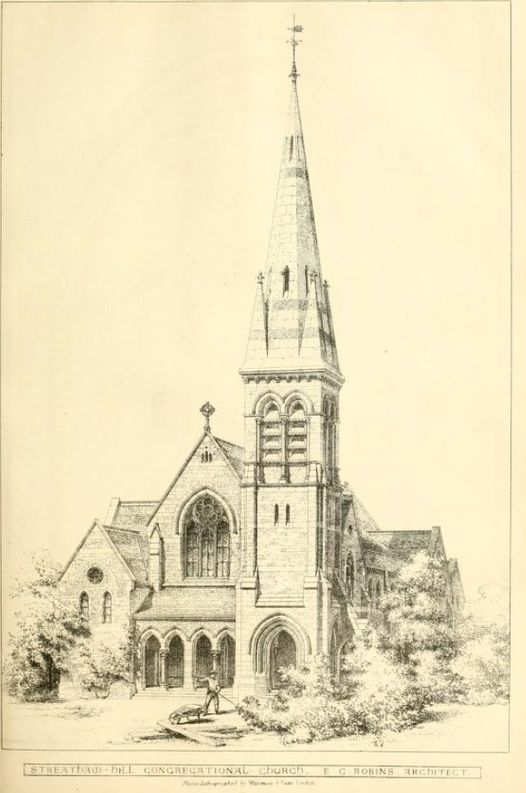
Streatham Hill Congregational Church

- 1871 Streatham Hill Congregational Church.

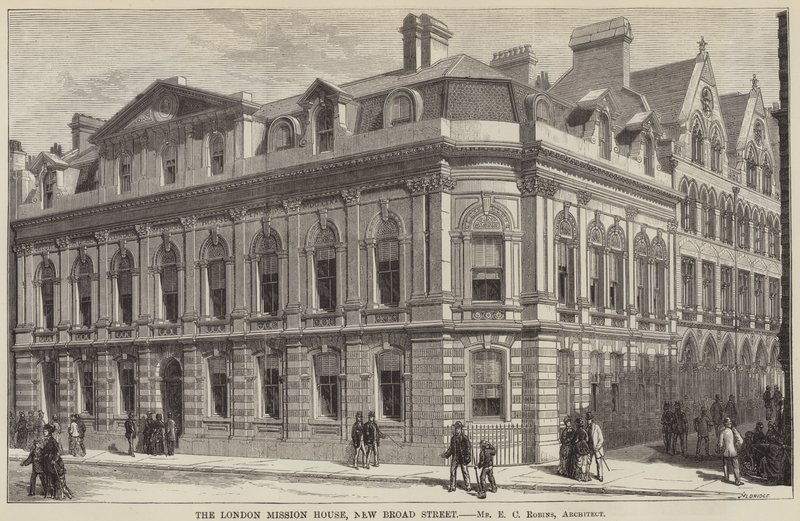
London Mission House, 1877 design drawing

- 1877, London Mission House, 23 Blomfield Street, London. It acted as headquarters for a period for the London Missionary Society, and was known also as Livingstone House. Replaced by Finsbury House at 22/23 Blomfield Street 1893–4 by Gordon, Lowther & Gunton.
- 1881, new building for the Evangelical Protestant Deaconesses' Institution and Training Hospital, Haringey. It was later known as Tottenham Hospital, and then Prince of Wales Hospital.

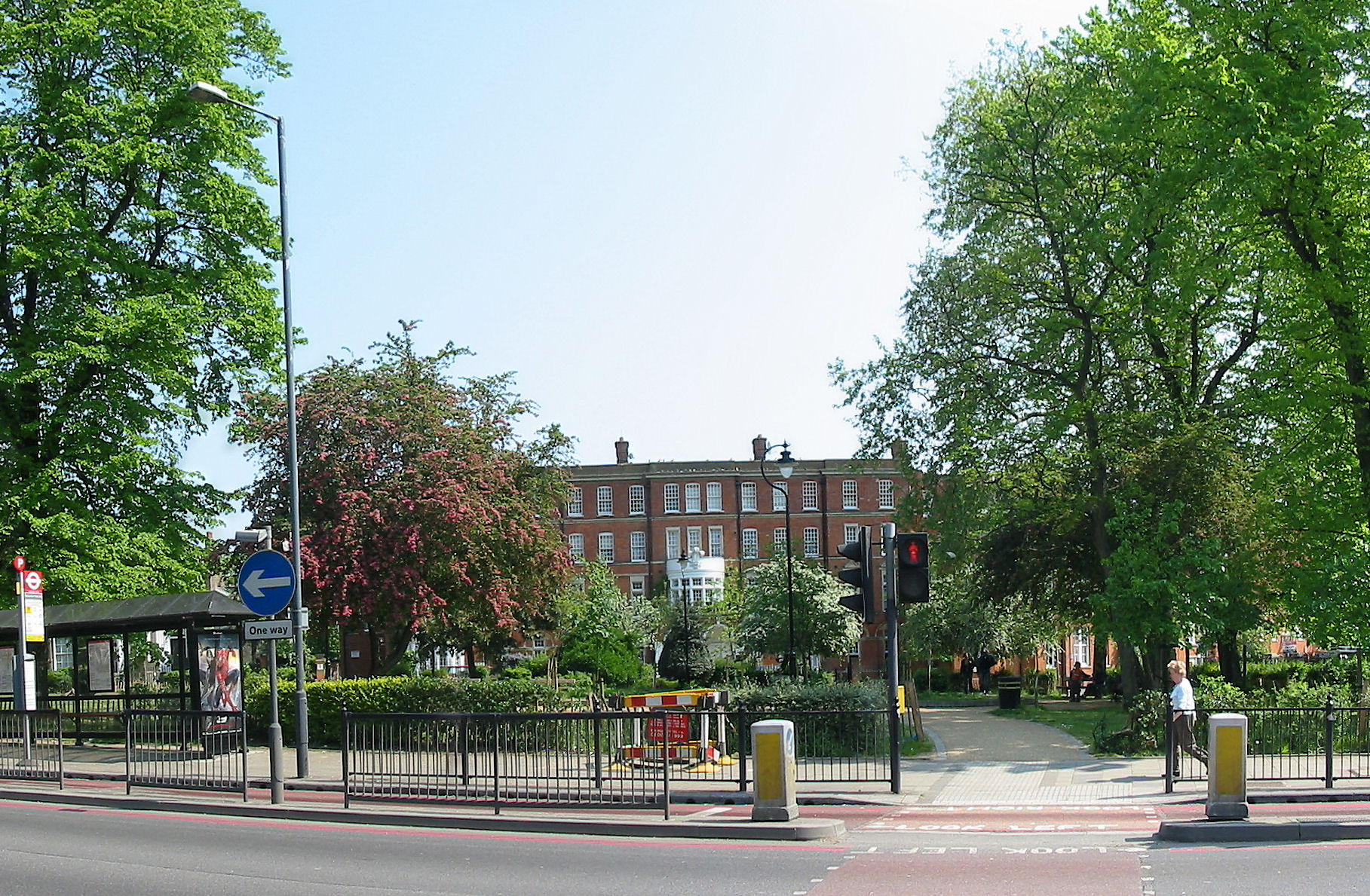
Former Tottenham Hospital building, now housing known as Deaconess Court, 2007 photograph

- Completed in 1883: designer of Finsbury Technical School, the first of a new crop of British training colleges. ##
- 1884, foundation stone laid in autumn 1883. Caterham School, architect.

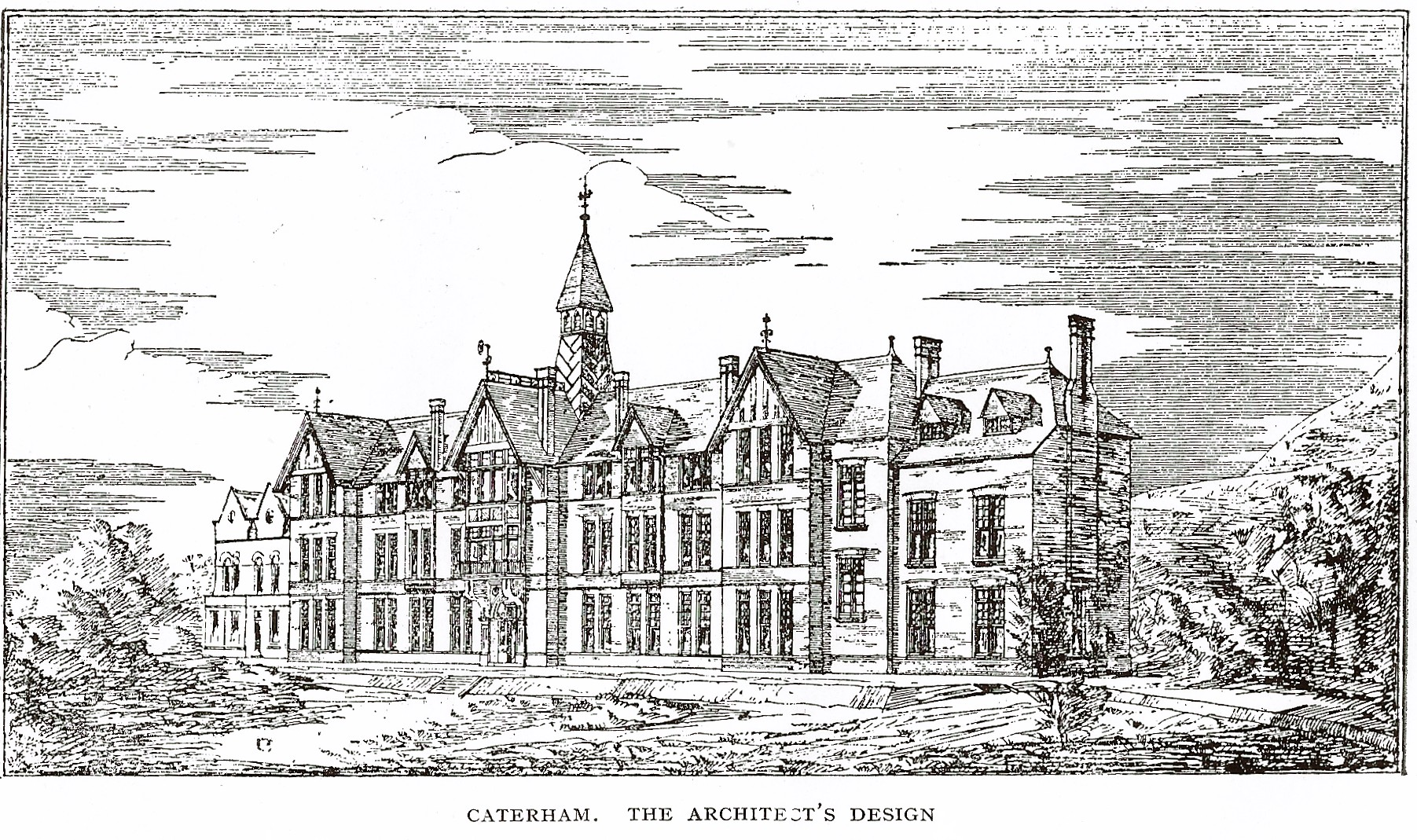
Caterham School, design view

== Books ==
- Papers on Technical Education, Applied Science Buildings, Fittings and Sanitation (1885)
- Technical School and College Building (1887). It included, for example, a chemistry bench design by Hermann Kolbe that became standard.
- The Temple of Solomon; & The Ethics of Art (1887), two lectures

== Family ==
Robins married in 1859 Elizabeth Southwell, sister of the three Southwell Brothers, photographers. Their only child, a daughter Ida Southwell Robins, a botanical artist, sculptor and illustrator, married in 1886 Henry Perrin.
