= Graham Chidgey =

English cricketer

Personal information
- Full name: Graham James Chidgey
- Born: 5 January 1937 (age 89); Lambeth, London, England
- Batting: Right-handed
- Bowling: Right-arm off break
- Role: Batsman

Career statistics
Competition	First-class
Matches	3
Runs scored	164
Batting average	27.33
100s/50s	1/0
Top score	113
Catches/stumpings	6/–
- Source: Cricinfo, 24 April 2013

Graham James Chidgey (born 5 January 1937) is a former English cricketer who made his career in the wine industry.

Chidgey was born in London and attended City of London School. A right-handed opening batsman who bowled right-arm off-spin, he was the school team's leading player in his final year, 1953, when he scored 370 runs at an average of 46.25, and took 27 wickets at 9.33.

Chidgey played club cricket, representing the Club Cricket Conference against the touring Indian team in 1959, and playing several matches for Surrey Second XI between 1955 and 1963. He made his first-class debut for the Free Foresters against Cambridge University in 1962 at Fenner's, scoring a century with a score of 113 in the Free Foresters' second innings. He made a further first-class appearance for the team in that season against Oxford University at the University Parks, while two years later he made a third and final first-class appearance for the Free Foresters against Oxford University.

Chidgey went into the wine trade in London after he left school in 1953. He took over the London wine firm of Laytons in 1965 and ran it until he sold it in 1997. He then spent many years in the Italian wine trade before returning to England in 2015. He wrote Guide to the Wines of Burgundy in 1977. In Italy he became an expert on the wine variety Brunello di Montalcino.
