= James Sherman (minister) =

English Congregationalist minister

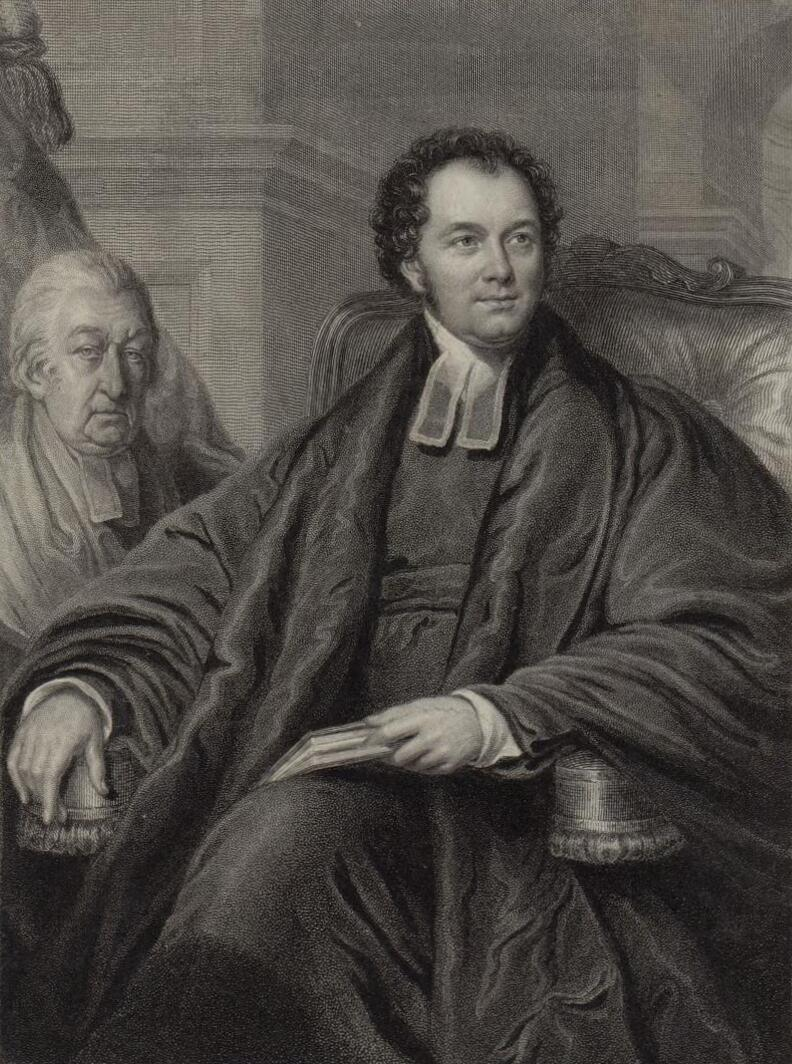
- Rev James Sherman, engraved for The Evangelical Magazine & Missionary Chronicle
- Born: February 21, 1796
- Died: February 15, 1862 (aged 65)
- Occupation: Congregationalist minister

James Sherman (21 February 1796 – 15 February 1862), was an English Congregationalist minister. He was an abolitionist, and a popular preacher at The Castle Street Chapel in Reading from 1821 to 1836. He and his second wife Martha Sherman made a success of Surrey Chapel, Blackfriars, London from 1836−54. Martha died in 1848.

Sherman was successor at the Surrey Chapel to Rowland Hill. Although he subsequently became known as a Congregationalist, Sherman was originally ordained to the Countess of Huntingdon's Connexion.

== Early life ==
The son of an officer in the East India Company, he was born in Banner Street, St. Luke's, London, on 21 February 1796. After some education from dissenting ministers, he spent three years and a half as apprentice to an ivory-turner.

Sherman entered, on 6 November 1815, the Countess of Huntingdon's Cheshunt College. He preached his first sermon in London in Hare Court chapel, Aldersgate Street, in 1817, and on 26 Nov. 1818 he was ordained to the ministry in Sion Chapel, Whitechapel. After preaching for some time in the Countess of Huntingdon's chapel at Bath, Somerset, he was appointed permanent minister of her chapel at Bristol, where he made the acquaintance of Hannah More and of Mary Anne Schimmelpenninck. In April 1821 he moved to Castle Street chapel, Reading, Berkshire.

== Association with the London Missionary Society ==
James Sherman was a prominent supporter of missionary work, principally the work of the non-denominational London Missionary Society. The missionary Rev. Samuel Oughton was sent to Jamaica from Sherman's Surrey Chapel in 1836; an arrangement on behalf of the Baptist Missionary Society, a body that worked closely with the LMS, and practiced congregational principles of church governance.

== Founding of Abney Park Cemetery ==
Shortly before 1840, James Sherman became a founding trustee and director of the Congregationalist's new non-denominational enterprise - Abney Park Cemetery.

All parts of the grounds were to be open for burial to everyone, regardless of denomination, without invidious dividing lines. It became the first garden cemetery in Europe to be wholly non-denominational in this respect whilst also having just one chapel, to be shared by everyone.

== Published books ==
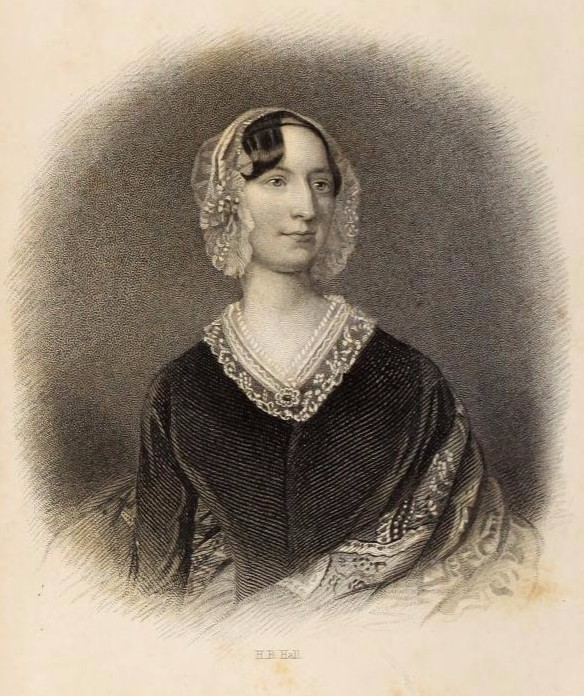
Martha Sherman

James Sherman's earliest works were devotional, but in the 1840s he developed his writing skills as a biographer. In 1848 James Sherman wrote The Pastor's Wife, a biography of Mrs Sherman in memory of her death that year from consumption on 18 May. He later completed a biography of Rowland Hill and the Quaker philanthropist and abolitionist William Allen.

== Work towards slavery abolition ==
Of political significance in the 1850s was a semi-fictional book written on one side of the Atlantic, to which James Sherman contributed an introduction written on the other. This was Uncle Tom's Cabin, by the American Congregationalist Harriet Beecher Stowe, with Sherman's introduction from London. The number of copies of the work sold was unprecedented in American literature. It was written in serial form for The National Era, an abolitionist newspaper, in 1851. When it appeared as a two volume work by March 1852, with Sherman's introduction, it quickly became a historic work. For the book's promotional tour in London in the early summer of 1852, Stowe, her husband, and her brother Charles Beecher, stayed at Sherman's house. At the same time he invited the African-American escaped slave and Congregational minister Samuel Ringgold Ward, and assisted his stay in Britain for nearly a year, helping him raise funds for the Canadian Anti-slavery Society at a time when many escaped slaves from the USA were trying to reach freedom in British Canada.

== Later life ==
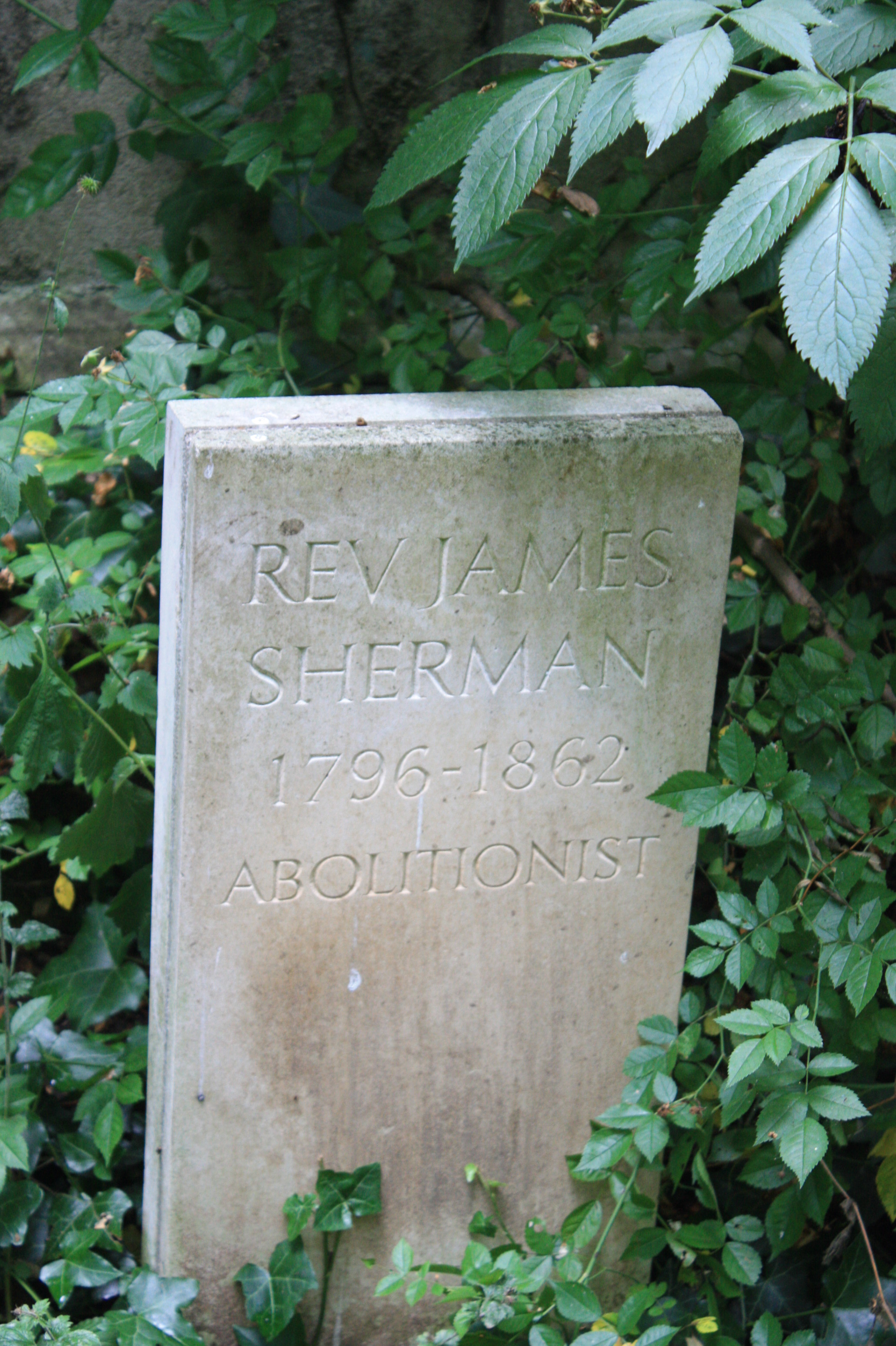
The modern marker stone to Rev James Sherman, Abney Park Cemetery, London

Sherman became minister at Blackheath Congregational Church 1854-62 and was succeeded at Surrey Chapel by Christopher Newman Hall. Hall continued Sherman's abolitionist cause by visiting America during the Civil War, and publishing books and making speeches to enlist British support on the side of the north: England should side with the North, he wrote, particularly because emancipation of the slaves is just.

== Death and memorial ==
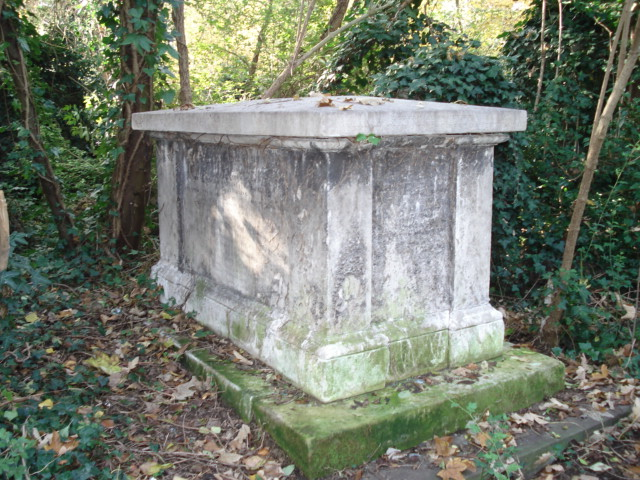
Memorial to Rev. James Sherman and Martha Sherman at Abney Park Cemetery, London

James Sherman died at his home in The Paragon, Blackheath, and was buried in a plain stone chest tomb at Abney Park Cemetery in Stoke Newington, London - the Congregationalist's novel non-denominational garden cemetery of which he was a founder director and trustee. His memorial stone is visible amongst the undergrowth from the westmost path. A modern marker stone has been placed in front of the original in order to distinguish the grave as seen from the path.

== Books ==
- Sherman, James (1851) Memoir of William Allen, London: Charles Gilpin
- Stowe, Harriet Beecher (1852) Uncle Tom's Cabin; or life among the lowly...with introductory remarks by J. Sherman, London:H.G.Bohn
- Stowe, Harriet Beecher (1875 edn.) Uncle Tom's Cabin; or life among the lowly...with introductory remarks by J. Sherman, London:George Bell & Sons
- Dearing, John (1993), The Church that would not die, Baron Birch
- Dearing, John (2021), "Sent from Reading", JBDearing
- Sherman, James (1829 edn.) A Guide to Acquaintance with God, Boston: James Loring
- Sherman, James (1850 edn.) The Pastor's Wife: a memoir of Mrs Martha Sherman, New York: American Tract Society

== Notes ==
Attribution

This article incorporates text from a publication now in the public domain: "Sherman, James". Dictionary of National Biography. London: Smith, Elder & Co. 1885–1900.

Religious titles
Preceded by Rev. Rowland Hill	Minister of Surrey Chapel; 1833 – 1854	Succeeded by Rev. Newman Hall
