= Surrey Chapel, Southwark =

Coordinates: 51.503907°N 0.104498°W

Surrey Chapel
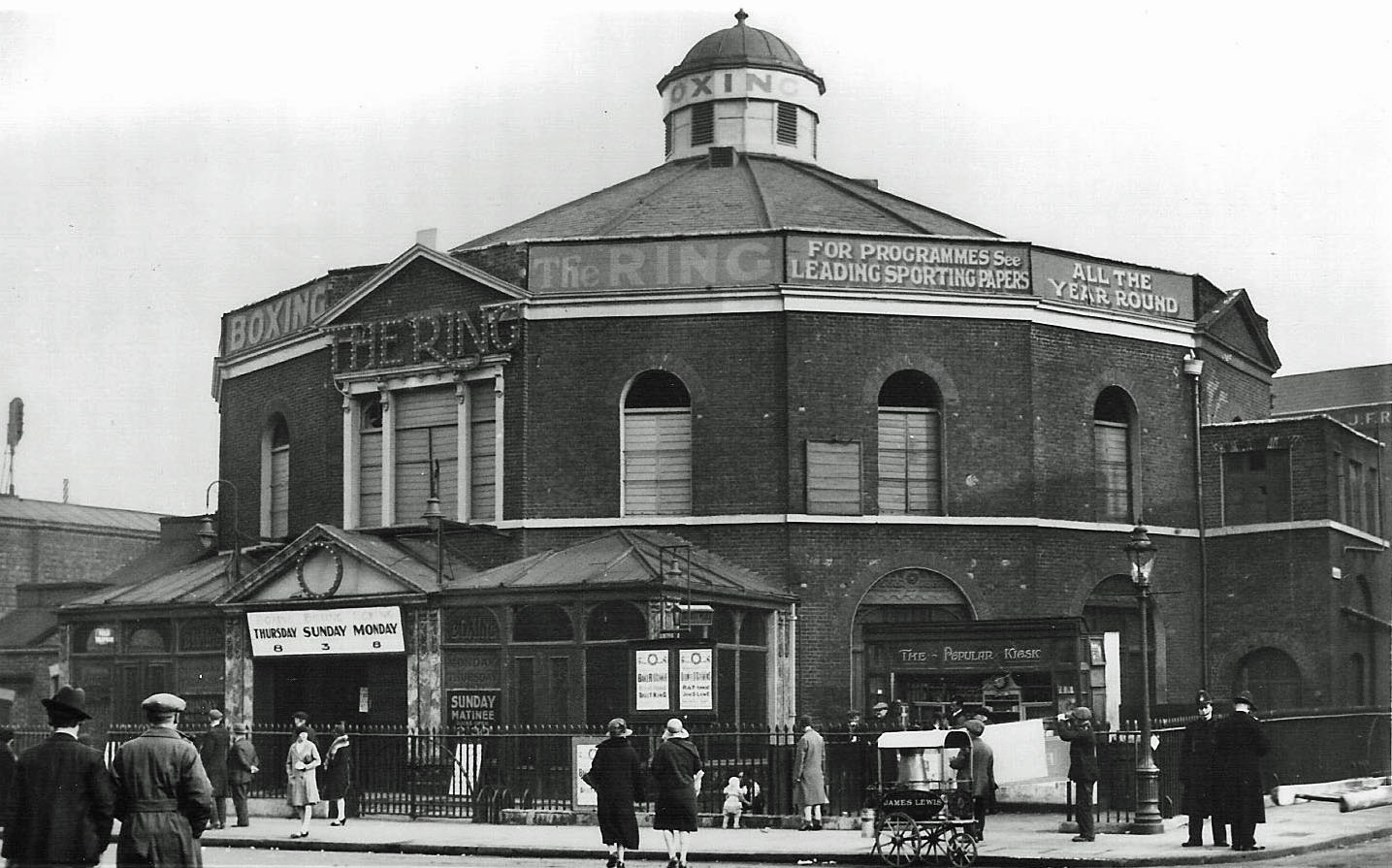
- The Chapel when in use as The Ring
- Surrey Chapel
- OS grid reference: TQ 31654 80033
- Location: Blackfriars Road, Southwark, London
- Country: England
- Denomination: Methodist, Congregationalist

History
- Founded: 8 June 1783
- Founder: Rowland Hill
- Dedicated: 1783

Architecture
- Architect: William Thomas
- Closed: 1881
- Demolished: 1942 (& partially in 1881)

Clergy
- Pastor(s): Rowland Hill, James Sherman, Christopher Newman Hall

The Surrey Chapel was an independent Methodist and Congregational church established in Blackfriars Road, Southwark, London on 8 June 1783 by the Rev. Rowland Hill. His work was continued in 1833 by the Congregational pastor Rev. James Sherman, and in 1854 by Rev. Newman Hall. The chapel's design attracted great interest, being circular in plan with a domed roof. When built it was set in open fields, but within a few years it became a new industrial area with a vast population characterised by great poverty amidst pockets of wealth. Recently the site itself has been redeveloped as an office block (currently occupied by Transport for London), and Southwark Underground Station has been built opposite.

== History ==
The chapel was designed by the obscure Welsh architect William Thomas (d. 1800). The building was hexadecagonal, a variation of the octagonal form preferred by Methodism's founder, John Wesley. The first stone of the chapel was laid in 1782, and the building opened in June 1783. Sponsorship was raised from Dissenting philanthropists such as the Methodist, Selina, Countess of Huntingdon. Regarding the form, its founding pastor Rowland Hill is said to have remarked, prevented the Devil from hiding in any corners. Rowland Hill, having a strong interest in inoculation, established one of the most effective vaccination boards in London at Surrey Chapel. He was buried, at his own request below the pulpit, but was later re-buried below the Lincoln Memorial Tower of the successor chapel, Christ Church, Kennington Road.

Surrey Chapel, though owned and managed by independent trustees primarily as a Nonconformist chapel, was operated as a venue for music, singing, and for the meetings of charities, associations and societies, several of which became closely associated with it. For a time, the composer and arranger Benjamin Jacob was organist, attracting thousands; a practical response to Rowland Hill's well known concern about chapel music of the time: "Why should the Devil have all the good tunes?".

One of the chapel's principal associations was with the non-denominational London Missionary Society; for over sixty years the society held its principal annual sermon at Surrey Chapel and from here dispatched many of its best known missionaries including Robert Moffat and John Williams.

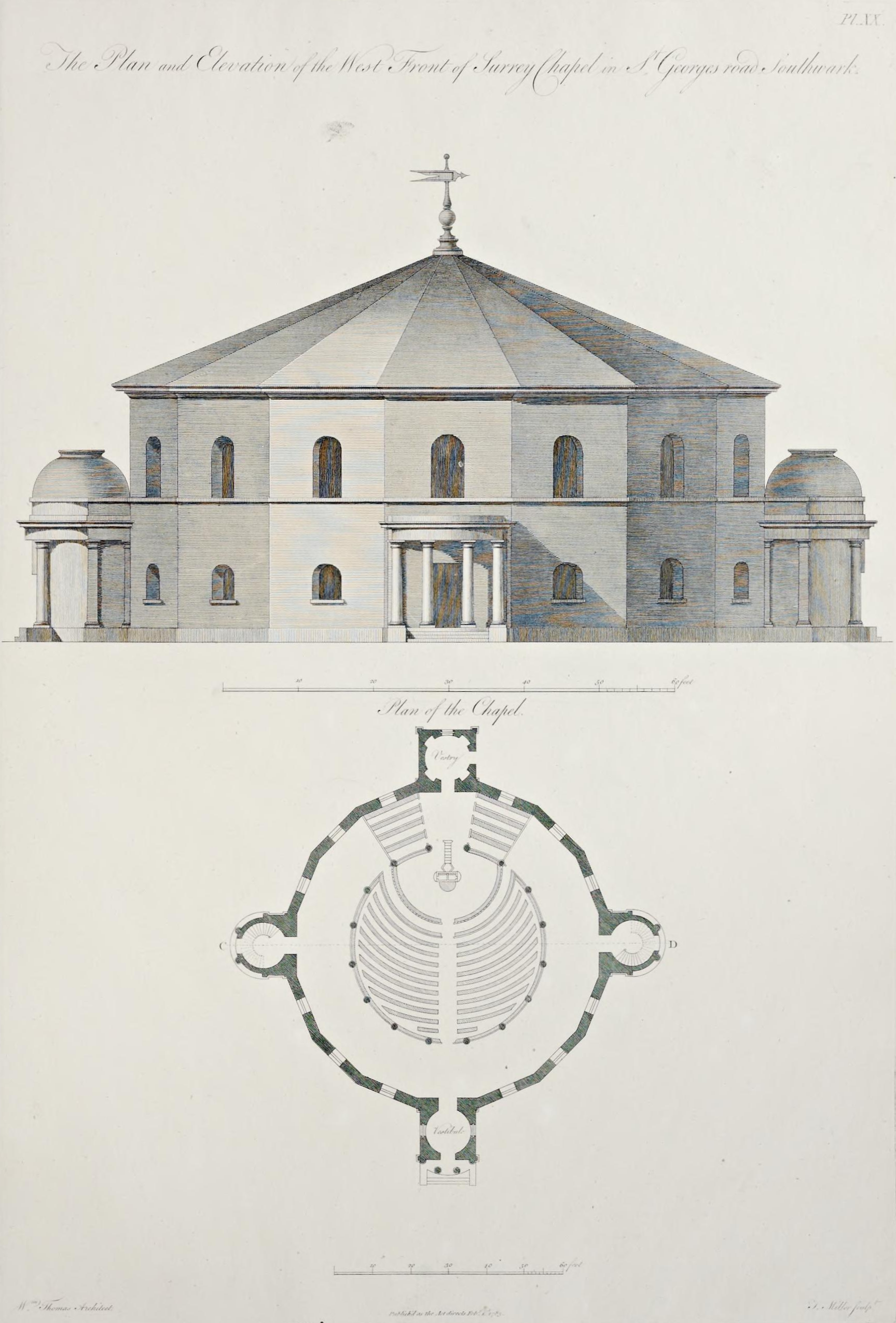
Architect William Thomas published his plans for the chapel in his 1783 book Original Designs in Architecture

The chapel made itself available to many religious figures of different denominations; those invited to preach within its walls included both Establishment and Nonconformist figures. Clergymen of the Establishment included Henry Venn) and Rev. Thomas Scott, whilst eminent Dissenting ministers included Dr Chalmers. Martha and James Sherman took over the pastorate in 1835 and their partnership contributed to the chapel's success. Sherman also took a nondenominational approach to burial reform, influencing the way Abney Park Cemetery. Surrey Chapel – as a result of this 'open door' policy – became a popular London venue for many different religious leaders, societies, and meetings, including some of an avowedly political nature, as well as the site of the first Sunday School in London. So much so, that new premises had to be found to accommodate the growth in services, ragged schools, Sunday schools and the Southwark Mission for the Elevation of the Working Classes – an auxiliary to Surrey Chapel managed by the plain speaking George Murphy for the increasing numbers of industrial poor of the district.

These additional premises included a nearby temperance hall (leased for about twenty years from 1844 using a centenary commemoration fund raised by James Sherman in honour of Rowland Hill, thus renamed Hawkstone Hall after his birthplace); and Lambeth Baths (whose use was paid for by Samuel Morley (MP) for additional Sunday services, meetings, lectures, classes, newspaper readings and musical entertainments). This growth led to the educational institutions of Surrey Chapel becoming probably more extensive than those connected with any free Church in the south of England. It became the nucleus of thirteen Sunday schools, four of them evening ragged schools, as well as day schools at Mansfield Street, Harrow Street, Kent Street, and Castle Yard, where more than five thousand children were taught by over four hundred teachers.

In 1859 the trustees and congregation, did not renew the lease and purchased land at Westminster Bridge Road and Kennington Road where (led by the pastor, Christopher Newman Hall) where they built a larger complex of buildings, which included a large chapel (Christ Church), lecture halls and school rooms (Hawkstone Hall) and the Lincoln Memorial Tower – the latter reflecting Newman Hall's campaigning role in the American Civil War and on the side of Abraham Lincoln and the abolition movement. The congregation migrated there in 1876, as did many of the societies associated with Surrey Chapel.

Rowland Hill's original chapel became used for various religious and social purposes, including by the Primitive Methodists for a time, before partial demolition, rebuilding and refitting works to suit it to commercial uses in 1881. The Illustrated London News reported its demise in May 1881 in these terms: "The demolition of the well-known circular meeting-house, or Dissenting Chapel, in Blackfriar's-road, Southwark, removes another familiar landmark of London's social and religious history".

== Later use ==
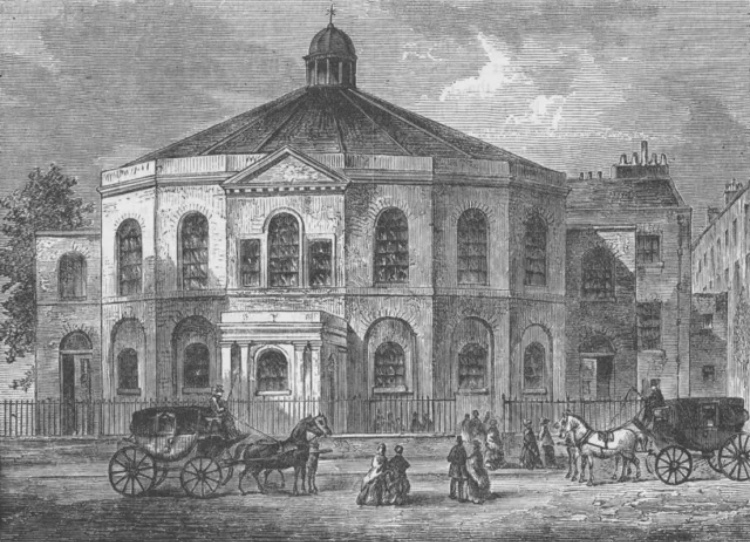
Rowland Hill's Chapel in 1814 – an 1880 illustration

Despite the fatalistic tone of the contemporary news report, sufficient of the original building was retained that it remained recognisable in the streetscene until bombed during the Second World War. Though it had various commercial uses after 1881, most notably as 'the Ring' – a boxing arena – which commenced in 1910. Dick Burge and his wife Bella Burge acquired the lease, and developed the venue so as to cater for a working class audience. In 1914 Bella became the first woman to attend a boxing match and soon her friend Marie Lloyd and other actresses became regular attendees at bouts.

Today, on the site of the Surrey Chapel is a modern office block named Palestra. The new building is used by Transport for London. Opposite, across Union Street, is Rowland Hill House, an interwar block of council flats named in honour of the chapel's founder.

The Surrey Chapel that existed in south London should not be confused with Surrey Chapel in Norwich, which was founded in 1844 and continues to the present day.

== Background reading ==
- Rev. Newman Hall D.D. (1868). Sermons with A History of Surrey Chapel and Its Institutions. New York: Sheldon

== See also ==
- 18th-century Western domes
