= New Society of Artists =

Art exhibition established in 1921

The New Society of Artists was formed in London in 1921. Its primary aim was to give a chance for artists whose work had not been accepted by the Royal Academy (RA) to exhibit their work in London and, later, in the provinces. In 1932 it became the United Society of Artists. The last known exhibition was in Margate in June 2017.

== History ==
The formation of the New Society of Artists (NSA) was announced in 1921. It was initially intended for artists whose works were “crowded out” from hanging by the RA, and to give artists in the provinces a chance to exhibit in London. The Provisional Council consisted of The Hon. John Collier, Mr Alex Maclean, Mr C R Chisman, Mr Henry S Kortright, Mr Percy Edsall and Mr Stafford Leake.

The inaugural exhibition was to have been at the Guildhall Art Gallery on 8 June, but instead it opened at the Royal Society of British Artists in Suffolk Street, not far from the RA, on 3 July. The location had been hired for five weeks each summer thanks to the efforts of Charles Robert Chisman and Percy Edsall, “both secretaries of well-known art societies”.

A Yorkshire newspaper reported that the exhibition opened with nearly 400 paintings and drawings, “and a very ordinary lot they are, showing in several instances marked imitative tendencies”. One of the most prominent exhibitors was the Welsh artist Miss Margaret Lindsay Williams, with two works: “Lorenzo Babini” and “The Imprisoned Soul”. Charles de Lacy reported that there had been a rush for membership of the new society.

The following year, the first provincial exhibition of works by NSA members was opened by the Mayor on 10 February at the Museum and Art Gallery, Burton on Trent. In April, a second such exhibition was opened in Worthing; it was greeted with lukewarm praise in the local press. In June 1922, the second annual exhibition opened. It was “an improvement on the first, and less like a collection of Academy crowded-outs. Women provide much of the quality…”

In 1923, the Westminster Gazette commented:

At the Suffolk-street Galleries there is the exhibition of the New Society of Artists. “New,” in this connexion, means lately formed, the general character of the work being that of a not very recent Academy exhibition. With the best will in the world it is impossible to say that the technical standard is high, too many of the works, particularly in portraiture, suggesting the anxiety of immature artists to come before the public.

Others took a more parochial view. The Hampstead News, for example, said that "There is much in it to interest residents in Hampstead and St John's Wood, as so many well-known artists from these parts have sent exhibits. The Hanging Committee ... have done their work well".

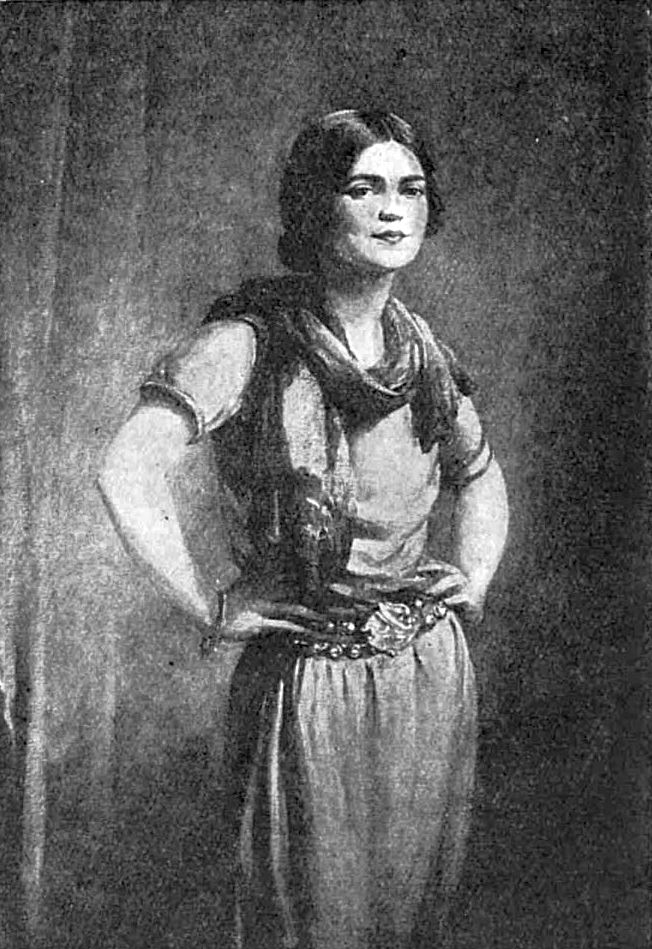
"Miriam" by Frank E Beresford, exhibited at the New Artists' Society exhibition, London 1924

The regional exhibition in February 1924 was held in Northampton. From there it moved to Cheltenham in March. At the 1924 annual exhibition in London, excellent portraits by W Howard Robinson, Frank E Beresford, A Jonniaux and E Newling were highlighted among the 400 exhibits. The fifth annual show opened as usual at Suffolk Street in June 1925. One reviewer commented:

Members of the New Society pride themselves that their work does not belong to the modern school of painting. When they paint a spade it looks like a spade, and no one could possibly mistake it for a banana. There is, among the 334 paintings shown at the exhibition, a refreshing lack of attempt at subtlety.

A significant change came in 1926, when the annual London show opened in January instead of the summer.

In June 1932 the annual exhibition opened in London, but this time under the name of the United Society of Artists; members were entitled to use the post-nominal UA.

The main reasons for the name change were

The United Society of Artists, hitherto styled the New Society of Artists, has decided to disuse the latter title because, as the Society was established in 1921, it is no longer appropriate. It was also found to be inconvenient, as it gave the erroneous impression that it is a body of so-called “advanced” artists, which is not the case. The aim is rather, while interfering in no way with the freedom of the members, to adhere to and if possible develop the best traditions of British Art, in preference to imitating those of Continental nations. An additional reason for the change of name was to avoid any misunderstanding due to the use of the word New, which is part of the title of an older and more distinguished Art Society.

The Society's 65th Annual Exhibition was held in London from 30 January to 10 February 1985, with an entrance fee of £1. The last known exhibition was in Margate in June 2017. A large number of the Society's annual exhibition catalogues is held at the National Art Library in London.

== Known NSA/UA members ==
Compiled from exhibitors mentioned in reviews of NSA exhibitions.

=== NSA members (1921-1931) ===
- Alfred Lys Baldry
- Edith Isabel Barrow
- Daisy Radcliffe Beresford
- Frank Ernest Beresford
- William Ramsden Brealey
- Beatrice Bright
- Louis Burleigh Bruhl
- Herbert Ashwin Budd
- Alice Mary Burton
- George Edmund Butler
- Conrad Hector Raphael Carelli
- Ernest Albert Chadwick
- Maurice Chesterton
- Charles Robert Chisman
- John Collier
- Gordon Coutts
- Frederick Thomas Daws
- Mary Ella Dignam
- Percy Edsall
- Augustus William Enness
- Leonard John Fuller
- Clive Gardiner
- Henry George Gawthorn
- Lewis Taylor Gibb
- Jessie Gibson
- Denis J Gill
- Stanley August Grimm
- Florence Eliza Haig
- Henry James Haley
- Sara Westralia Hall
- Ernest Llewellyn Hampshire
- Arthur William Head
- Hilde Hechler
- William Egerton Hine
- Jamison Howell
- Eric Hesketh Hubbard
- Robert Morson Hughes
- Cecil Ackland Hunt
- Alfred Jonniaux
- Sydney Percy Kendrick
- Erna Hoppe Kinross
- Henry Somers Kortright
- Llewelyn Stafford Leake
- Gerard Leigh-Hunt
- Peter Leslie
- Guy Lipscombe
- Stanislaus Soutten Longley
- William Luker
- Alexander (Alex) Maclean
- William Matthison
- Florence Marks
- Charles Stephen Meacham
- Frederick Howard Michael
- Harry Robert Mileham
- Arthur Croft Mitchell
- Mariquita Jenny Moberly
- Robert Morley
- Thomas Edwin Mostyn
- Bernard Munns
- Herbert Waterford Neville
- E Newling
- E L Norris
- William Edward Parkinson
- M Peploe-Earle
- Hedwig Esther Pillitz
- Hettie Tangye Reynolds
- William Howard Robinson
- WIlliam B Rowe
- Vivian Desmond Ryan
- Eva Savory
- Laurence J. Scott
- Lady Nora Scott
- Edward Seago
- G L Sheppard
- Kenneth Denton Shoesmith
- Louis F Silas
- Phyllis Simpson
- Leonard Frank Skeats
- Eric Slater
- Mabel Mary Spanton
- Nathaniel Sparks
- Harold Speed
- Phoebe Stabler
- Henry Straker
- Kathleen Sturgeon
- Anne Style
- Robert John Swan
- Henry John Sylvester Stannard
- Edward Spilsbury Swinson
- Vere Temple
- Duff Tollemache
- Marianne Lucy Trench
- Arthur Twidle
- Frederick Dudley Walenn (Principal of the St John's Wood Art School)
- J L Walker
- Catherine R. Walton
- Margaret Raymond Wansey
- Emily Warren
- Marjory Violet Watherston
- Elizabeth Watson
- Muriel, Lady Wheeler
- Dulcie Whetham
- Edwin Whitney-Smith
- Kate Stanley Wilkinson
- Charles Wills
- Winifred Wilson
- Roland Wheelwright
- Margaret Lindsay Williams
- Margaret Evangeline Wilson
- W P Caton Woodville
- Lilian Yeend-King

=== NSA/UA members in 1932 ===
- Ethel Lucy Adam
- Wilhelmina Rose Aitken
- Anne Anderson (Mrs Alan Wright)
- Alfred Lys Baldry
- Harry Banks
- Isabel Bannister
- Daisy Radcliffe Beresford
- Frank Ernest Beresford
- Capt. B H Bevan-Petman
- Clifford George Blampied
- Alfred Richard Blundell
- Alfred Edward Borthwick
- Lady DM Bower
- Beatrice Bright
- Nicholas Bristowe
- James Stuart Campbell McEwan Brown
- Charles Buchel
- James Ed Callahan
- Colin Cairns Clinton Campbell
- Ernest Albert Chadwick
- Albert Chanler
- Lena Chevalier
- The Hon John Collier
- M I Cotton
- Marion E L Cox
- Edward Rimbault Vere Dibdin
- Sara Beatrice Dibdin
- Mary Ella Dignam
- Joyce Deighton Dixon
- Dudley Dixon
- Evelyn, Lady Devonshire
- Alfred Henry Dyer
- Cecilia Engel
- Charles Edwin Flower
- Amy Constance Reeve-Fowkes
- Arthur F Reeve Fowkes
- Ralston Snow Gibbs
- Phoebe Gibson
- M A Gosling
- Doris Gregory
- Henry James Haley
- Hylda G Hall
- Sara Westralia Hall
- Nora G Hamilton
- Henry Edward Hiles
- Margaret McFarlane Hurd
- Frank Jameson
- Walter Monckton Keesey
- Thomas Meikle Kelly
- Sydney Percy Kendrick
- Esther Barbara Nicloux Kerr
- Henry Somers Kortright
- Elsie Lamont
- Percy Leslie Lara
- Mabel Elizabeth Lomnitz
- Elizabeth B Macdonald
- Alexander (Alex) Maclean
- Mary Macleod
- Winifred Marshall
- Evelyn Gladys Mellersh
- Lucy Constance Marian Millett
- Mariquita Jenny Moberly
- Frances Wynne Murray
- Herbert W Neville
- J H Norman
- E L Norris
- John A (Jack) Pamby
- Josephine Paxton
- Kathleen Margaret Pearson
- Cecile A Proctor
- E J Proctor
- Councillor T Ramsden
- A Constance Richardson
- Frank O. Salisbury
- Louis F Silas
- M Stuart Smithson
- Charles Neame Spencer
- Euphans Hilary Strain
- Henry Straker
- Robert John Swan
- M Theyre
- W E Thom
- Morgan Alfred Thornley
- Herbert Alker Tripp
- Alex F Turner
- Arthur Twidle
- Joseph William Topham Vinall
- Hilda Annetta Walker
- Vernon Beauvoir Ward
- Kathleen Waters
- Evelyn Watherston
- Marjory V Watherston
- Rosa Mary Whitlaw
- Winifred Wilson
- Arthur George Witherby
- Harold J Yates

=== UA exhibitors/members, 1932 and later ===
Entries without references are derived from the 1932 catalogue.

- Anne Acheson
- Hester Elizabeth Adlercron
- M. Aitken
- Beth Amoore
- Elaine Ask
- Evelin Winifred Aston
- Jean Aust
- Elizabeth Christie Austen-Brown
- Stanley Nicholson Babb
- Miss G. B. Barlow
- Gertrude Bayes
- Gilbert Bayes
- E. H. Blakesley
- Barbara Blue
- Annie Bryant
- Lorna Burgoyne
- H. O. Carroll
- Mary Carruthers
- Nelia Casela
- F. E. Castle
- Edwina Chaston
- Minnie Ellen Clarke
- Arthur Cotterell
- Gordon Coutts
- Heather Craigmile
- Janet Cree
- Gerard Crichton
- Stella Rebecca Crofts
- Cedric Dawe
- Rodolphe d'Erlanger
- J. Doyle
- Steve Duffy
- Christina Dugnid
- Mary Duncan
- Dorothy Zinaida Duval
- Mabel G. East
- Grace English
- Margaret Evans
- Wilfred (Mick) Finn
- Sydney Foley
- Peter Foulkes (honorary)
- Mary Fowdrey
- Jacqui Galise
- Mabel Molesworth Godfrey
- Elizabeth Goudge
- L. D. Green
- Joseph Greenup
- P. M. Greenwood
- M. A. F. Grove
- C. G. Guy
- Gordon Hales
- David Headon
- Robert William Hill
- Janet Mabel Haughton
- Louise Heertjes-Comerell
- Florence Hess
- Forrest Hewit
- Reginald Arthur Hignett
- William Eric Horsbrugh-Porter
- G. E. Hunt
- George Robert Hunt
- Henry Hay Hunter
- John Wilson Jowsey
- Christine Koch
- Geoffrey Lilley
- M. C. Livingston
- Hermione Thornton Lofthouse
- W. P. W. Lucas
- Arthur Stewart Mackay
- Clive Madgwick
- E. Philip B. Mansel
- Franco Matania
- J J McConnell
- Kirsten Meyer
- Blenda A. R. Morgan
- Matilda Mulvey
- Ruby Mundin
- Constance Bertha Nash
- John Henry Norman
- Bess Norriss
- A. B. Novis
- Richard Bertram Ogle
- Leigh Parry
- George Malcolm Patterson
- Eric Patton
- Florens Paul
- Brian Petch
- Charles James Pibworth
- Marcus W. Pitts
- G H Vincent Plant
- Stewart Rodgers
- Dorothy Savage
- K. Eileen Platt
- W. D. Pusinelli
- Omar Ramsden
- Rhys Raworth
- Michael Reilly
- K. Roberts
- Hans Royaards
- Eva Savory
- Donald Seagars
- John Semmence
- Joan Sawdon Smith
- Tony R Smith
- Yvonne Smith
- Belinda Tong
- Gladys Rees Teesdale
- Pat Trudghill
- Joyce Tully
- Sherree Valentine-Daines
- Michael Vincent
- Peter Walbourn
- David Innes Sandeman Wood
- Harold Workman
- Cai Yuan
- Linda Zelin
