= Keesey =

Keesey is a surname. Notable people with the surname include:

- Michael S. W. Keesey (born 1937), scientist and namesake of minor planet 5554 Keesey
- Jim Keesey (1902–1951), American professional baseball player
- Walter Monckton Keesey (1887–1970), English architect and artist
