= Alfred Lys Baldry =

English art critic and painter

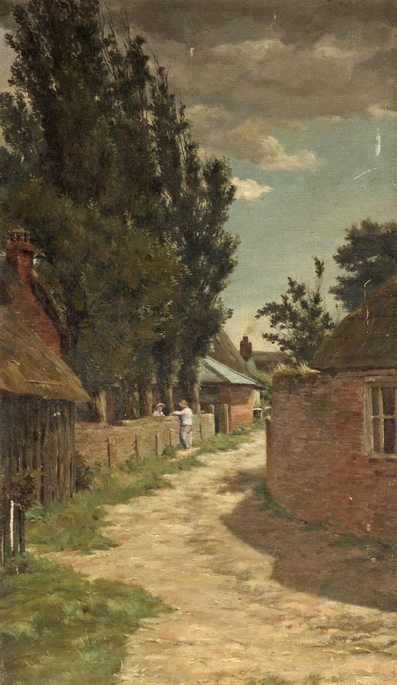
Wick Lane from Wick Ferry (1882) by Alfred Lys Baldry

Alfred Lys Baldry (1858 – 18 May 1939) was an English art critic and painter.

He was born in Torquay, Devon, the son of Alfred Baldry and Charlotte Whitehead.

Baldry studied at the University of Oxford and the Royal College of Art, and as a pupil of Albert Joseph Moore. He exhibited works during the 1880s. Later he was Moore's biographer, this being an 1892 commission from Montague Marks, editor of Art Amateur. After Moore's death in 1893 he arranged an exhibition, with Walford Graham Robertson, of 100 of Moore's works. He also wrote a biography of Hubert von Herkomer. Baldry was a member of the New Society of Artists.
