= Thomas Edwin Mostyn =

English artist (1864 – 1930)

Thomas Edward Mostyn RWA RCA ROI
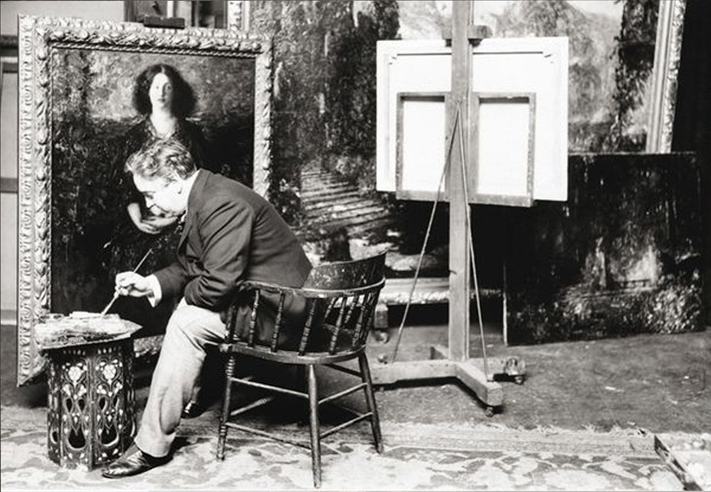
- Thomas Edwin Mostyn in his studio working on a painting, likely Romance.
- Born: 1864; Liverpool
- Died: 22 August 1930 (aged 66); Manchester

Thomas Edwin Mostyn (1864 – 1930) was an English artist who worked during the late Victorian era and the early 20th century. Mostyn's works are mainly remembered from his idealistic and romantic garden scenes, as well as various portraits.

== Biography ==
Although born in Liverpool in 1864, Mostyn was raised in Manchester. He studied at the Manchester Academy of Fine Arts, and had exhibited at the Royal Academy by the time he was 29. He entered the school of Sir Hubert Von Herkomer in 1893, where he created paintings in a realistic style that often depicted the poverty of the working classes. By the end of World War I, Mostyn's style was changing, preferring to depict enchanted garden scenes, which he would become most famous for. He held several solo exhibitions in the Fine Art Society, London during the 1920s, and was also a member of the New Society of Artists.. Mostyn died in Manchester, in 1930, aged 66.

== Legacy ==
Mostyn's works are often offered at auction, even up to today. In September 2003, a work of his (Portrait of a lady, three-quarter-length, in a green and gold dress – see here) sold at Christie's for £39,950, almost 800% more than the high-estimate of £5,000, and broke the record price for a work by the artist.

== Gallery ==
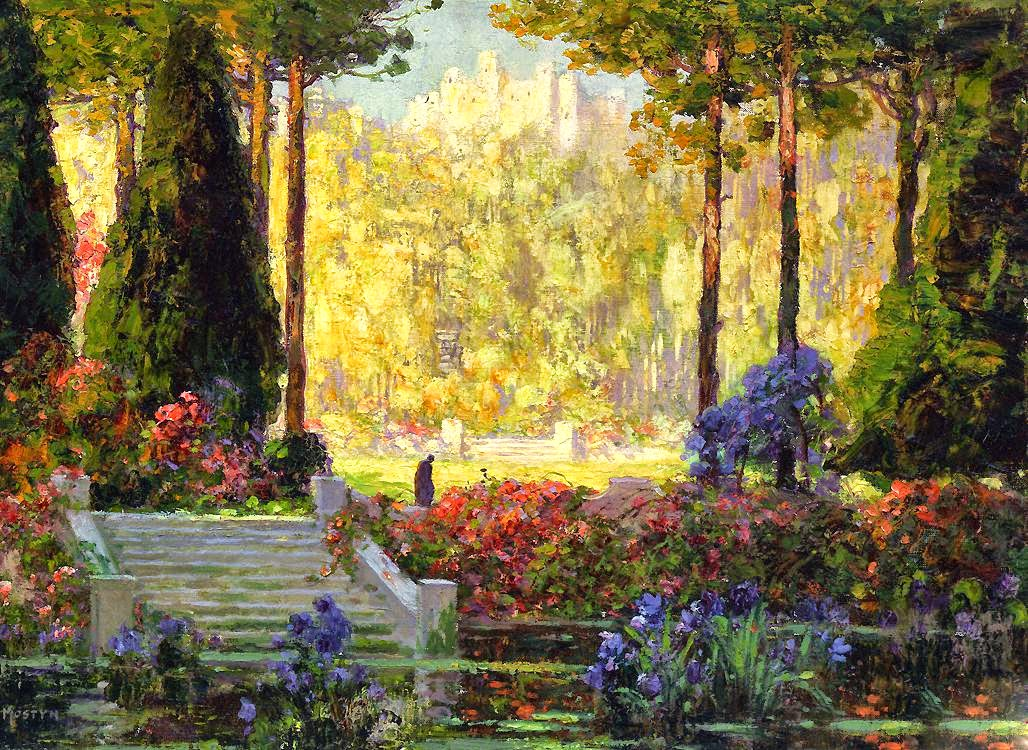

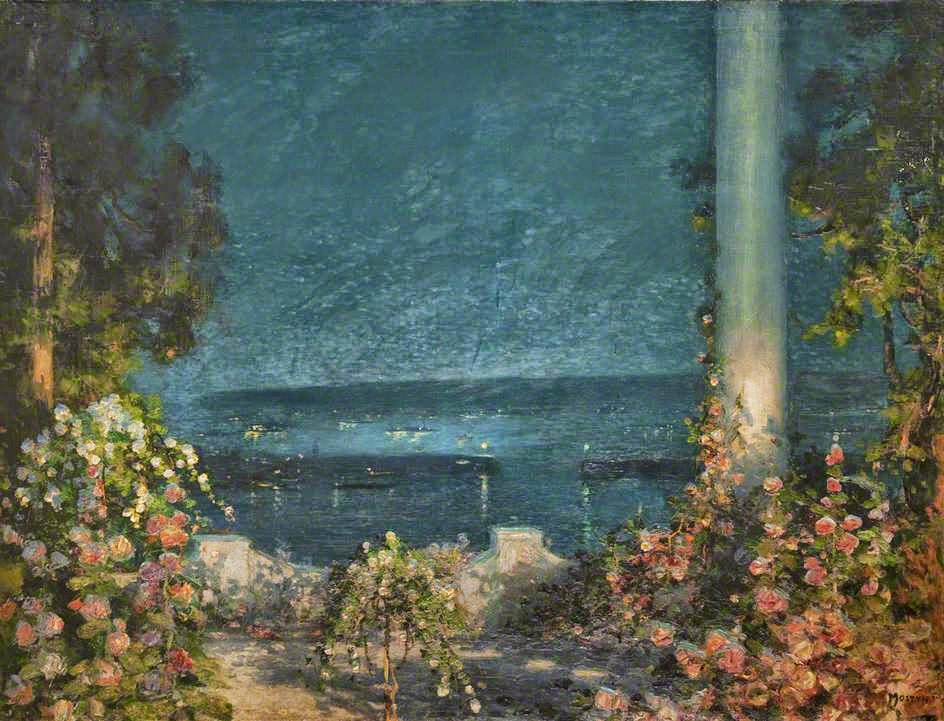

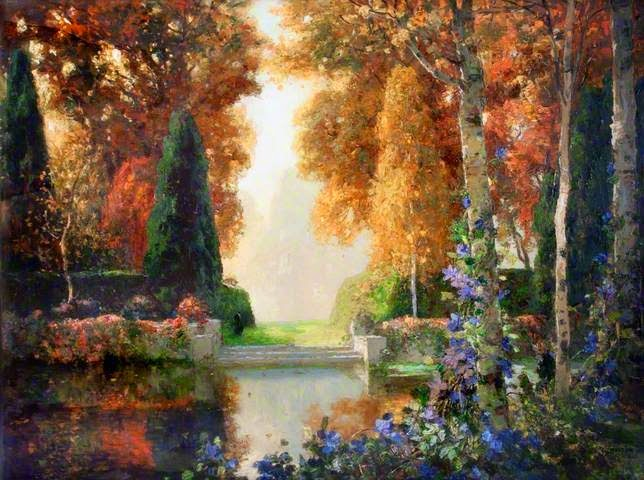

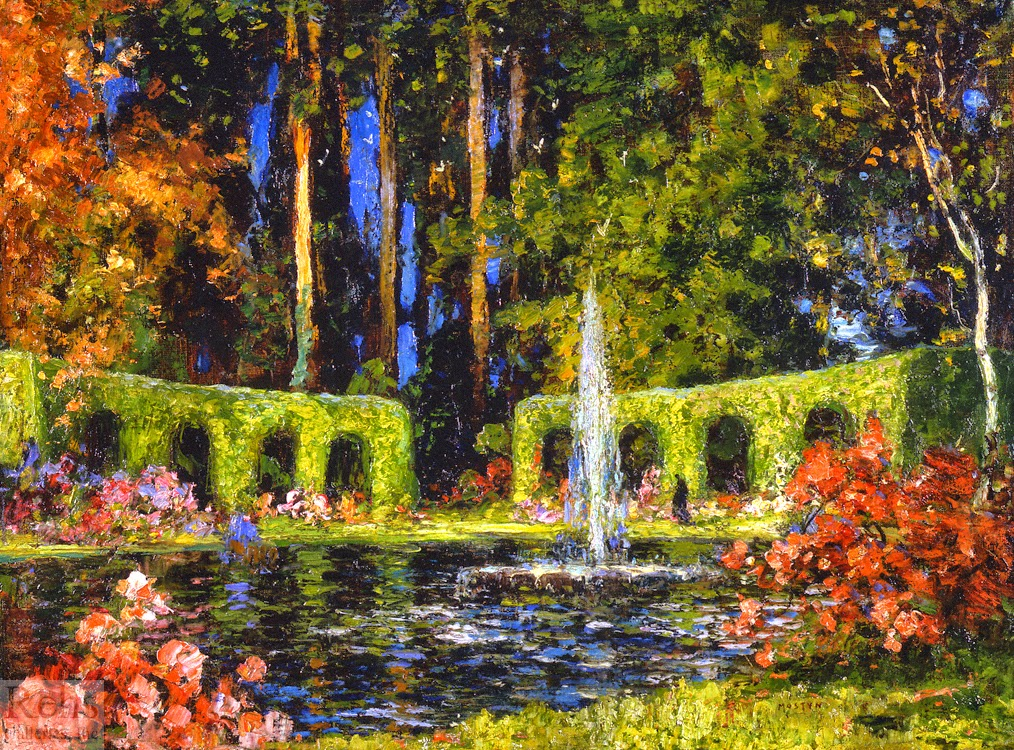

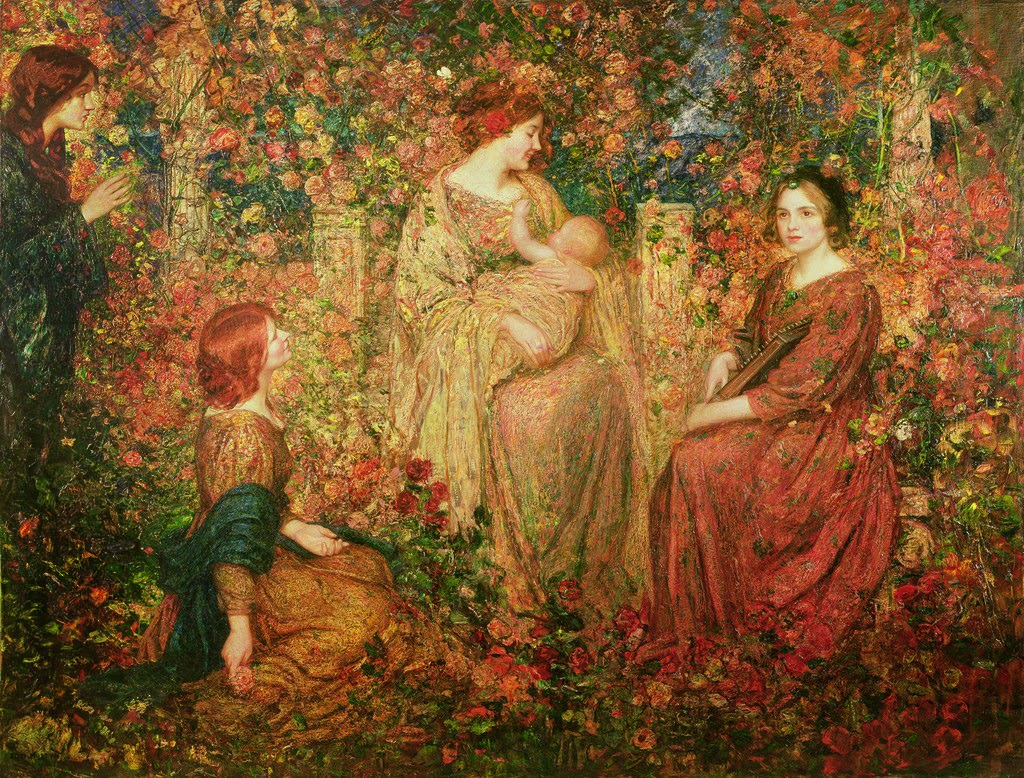

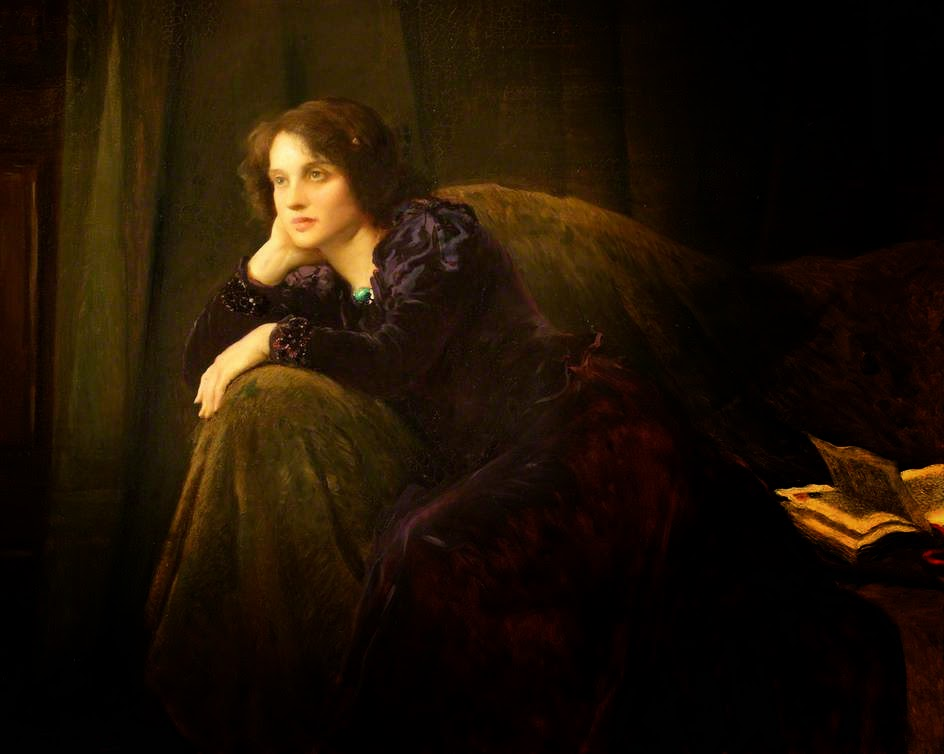

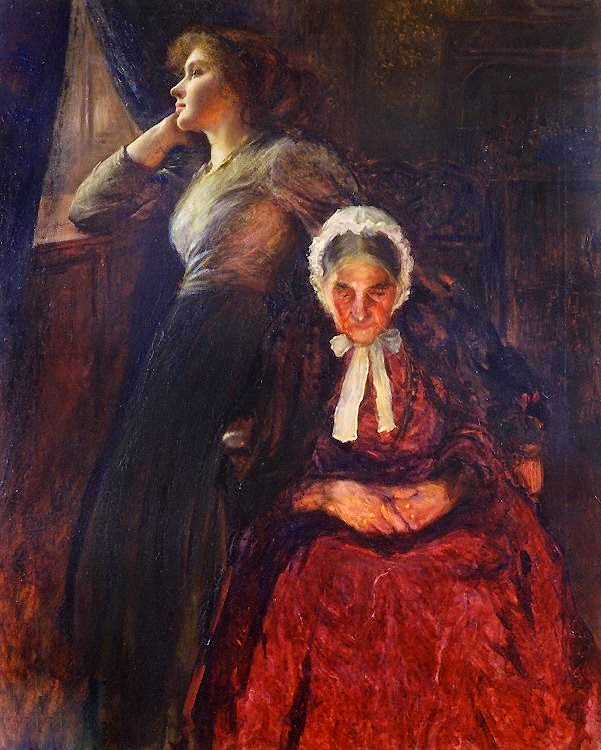

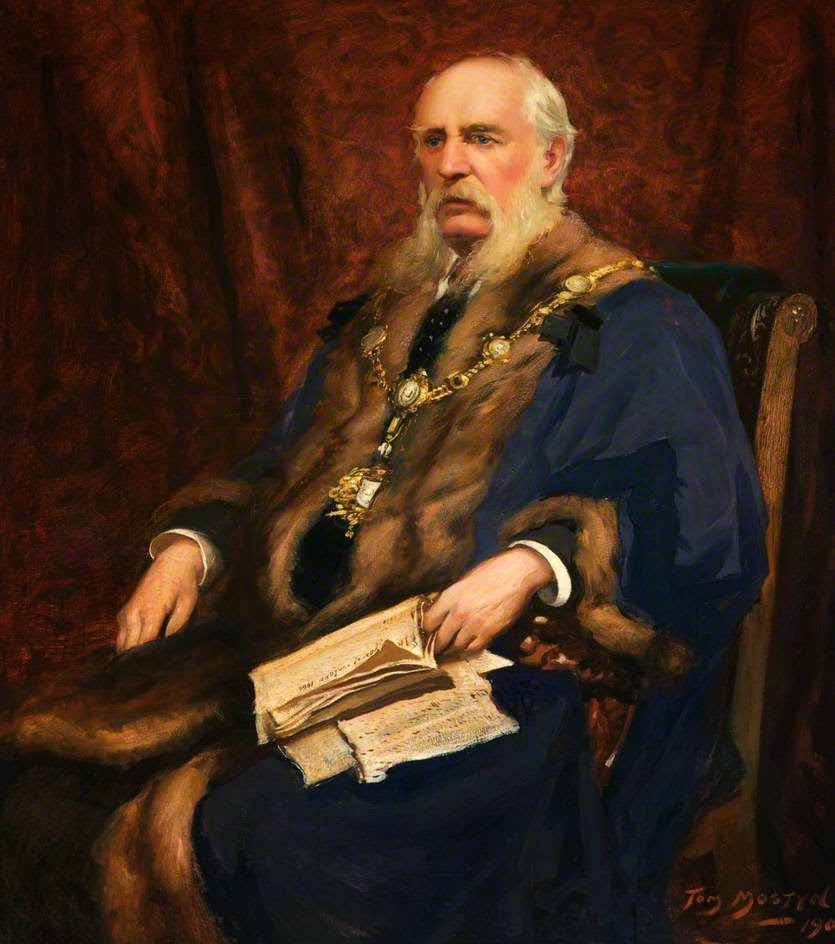
Henry Fishwick

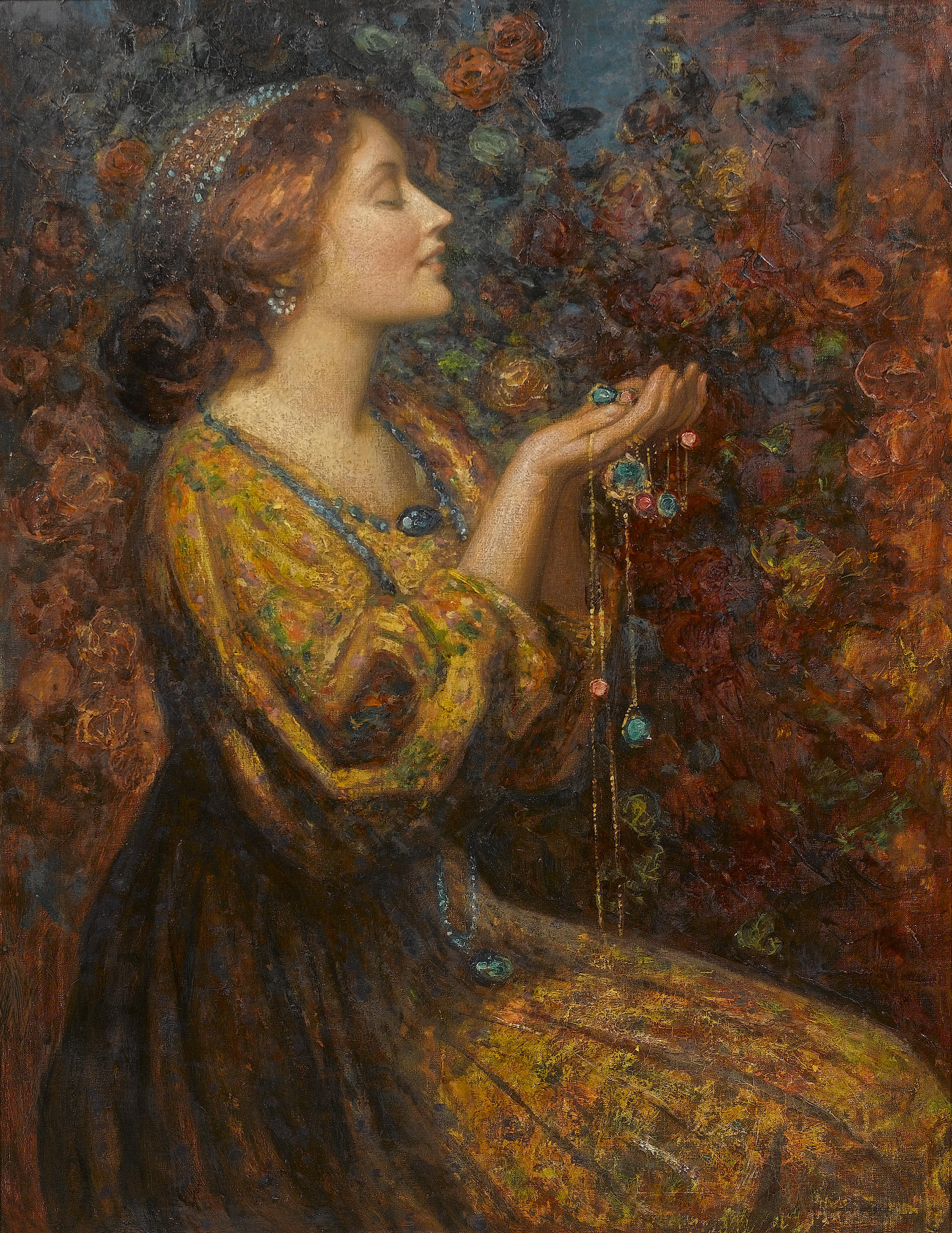
Jewels

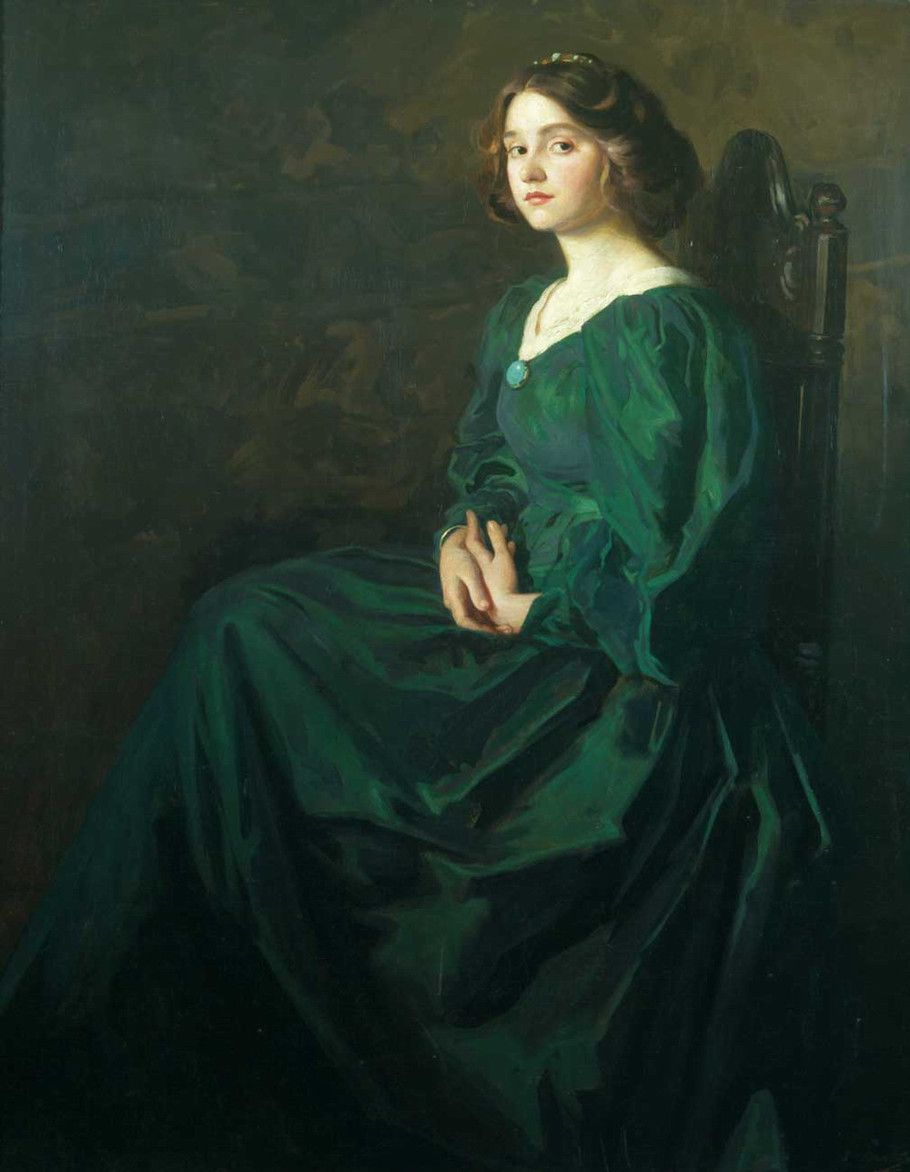
The Green Gown

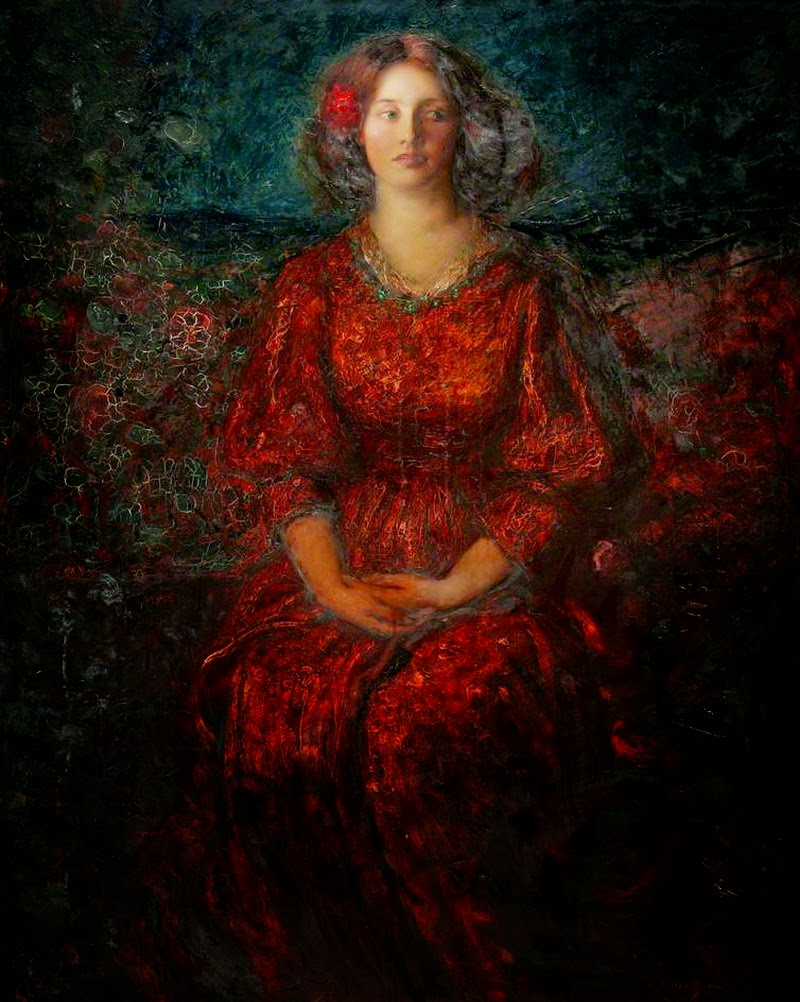
Romance

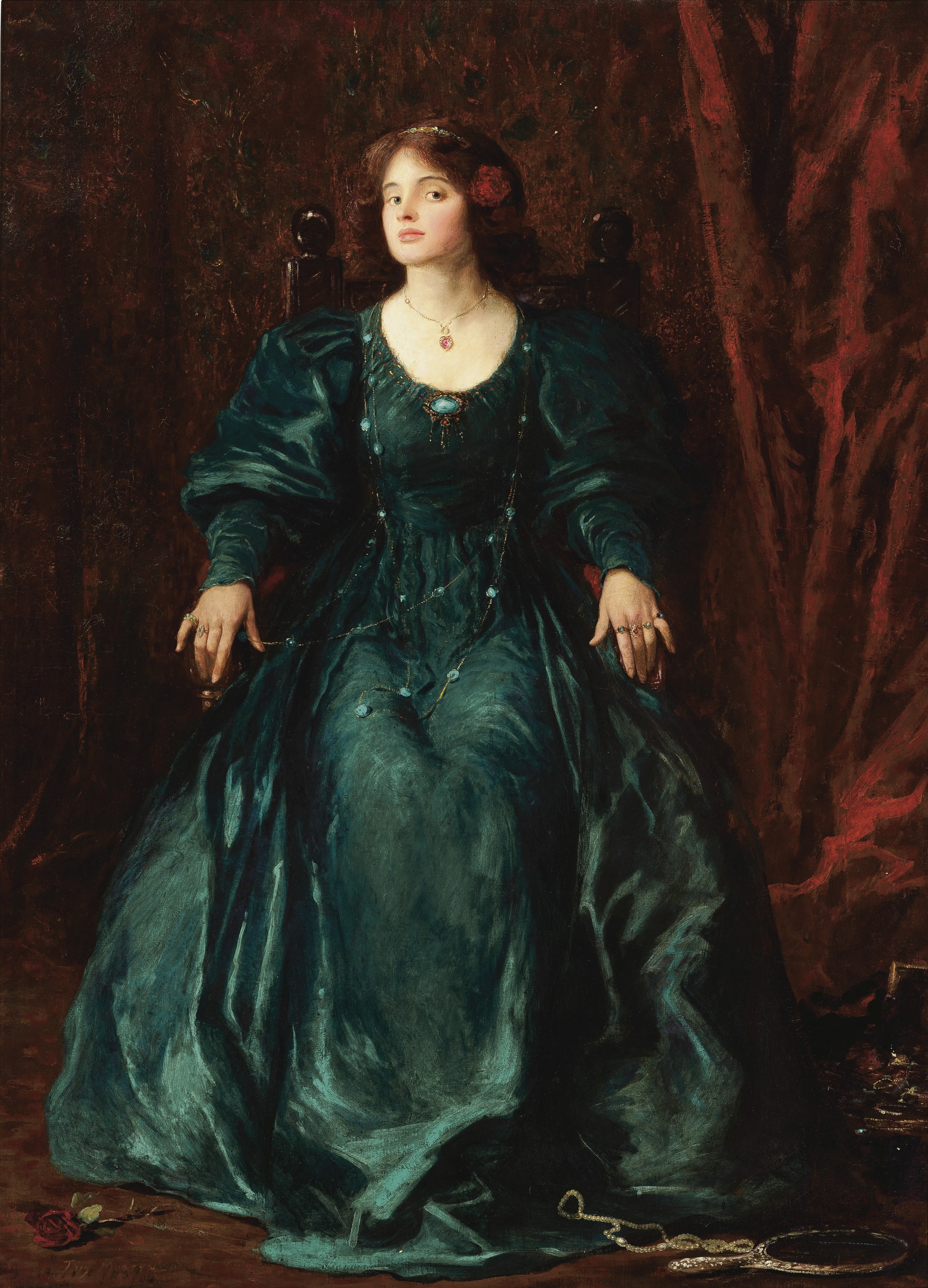
Vanity, 1904

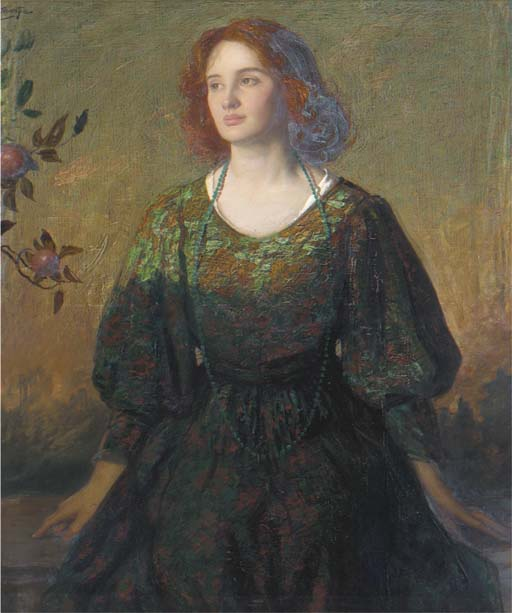
Portrait of a lady, three-quarter-length, in a green and gold dress
