= Vere Temple =

British artist

Vere Lucy Temple (8 February 1898 – 14 March 1980) was a British author and artist, best known for her illustrations of British wildlife. She had a particular interest in entomology.

== Life ==
Vere Temple was born at Boreham Manor, two miles east of Warminster, Wiltshire to parents Grenville and Katherine Temple. Her father was a man of "private means". She showed an early aptitude for art, and her mother compiled an album of her drawings, the earliest of which was dated December 1901 and in which "it is possible to spot evidence of the extraordinary 'eye' which was in due course to blossom". From the 1920s, her work was exhibited in many leading galleries across the country, including the New Society of Artists in London. In 1932, Temple had her portrait painted by Sir Cedric Morris.

In 1939, she was living in a flat in Notting Hill, London. By the 1940s, Temple was living at Tollard Royal, Wiltshire. By 1947, Temple was a member of the Royal Entomological Society of London.

She died in 1980 in Ringwood, Hampshire. In 1981, an auction of her "studio collection of very fine botanical, entomological, domestic and wildlife drawings, watercolours and book illustrations" was sold in more than 180 lots by the auctioneers Lawrence's of Crewkerne.

Examples of her art are held in the collections of the British Council, Manchester City Gallery, the National Portrait Gallery and the Museum of New Zealand Te Papa Tongarewa.

== Books by Vere Temple ==
- An Artist Goes to the Dogs (1937)
- Baby Animals on the Farm, and How to Draw Them (1941)
- How to Draw Wild Flowers (1942) London: Studio Publications
- Butterflies and Moths in Britain (1945) London: B. T. Batsford
- Flowers and Butterflies (1946) London; New York: The Studio, "How To Do It" Series, no. 33
- British Butterflies (1949) London: Collins, "Britain in Pictures" Series
- How to Draw Pond Life (1956) London: Studio Publications

== Illustrating others' works ==
- Hedgerow Tales by Enid Blyton (1935)
- Hutchinson's Dog Encyclopaedia (1935)
- Insect Life in Britain by Geoffrey Taylor (1945)
- British Garden Flowers by George M. Taylor (1946)
- Some British Beetles by Geoffrey Taylor (1948)

== Catalogues ==
- List of water colours of British plants and trees executed by Vere Temple of Kings Chase, Tollard Royal, Salisbury
