= Mariquita Jenny Moberly =

English artist, working in oil and watercolour

Mariquita Jenny Moberly RI BWS NSA
- Born: Mariquita Jenny Phillips; 2 November 1855; Deptford, London, England
- Died: 1 November 1937 (aged 81); Mitcham, Surrey, England
- Known for: Painting
- Spouse: Herbert Guy Moberly

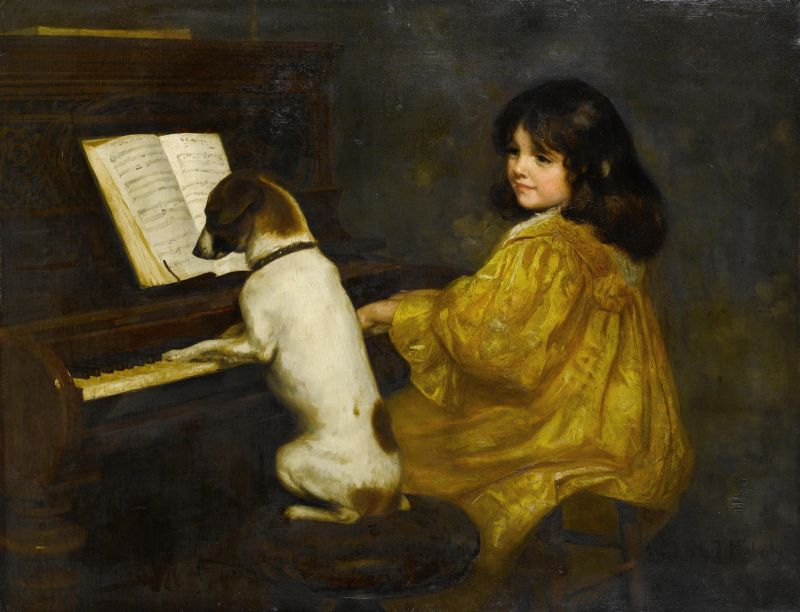
The Duet

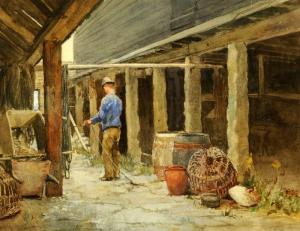
Fisherman Repairing Nets

Mariquita Jenny Moberly RI , née Phillips, (2 November 1855 – 1 November 1937) was an English artist, working in oil paints and watercolours.

== Biography ==
Moberly was born on 2 November 1855 to John Phillips and Jane Atkins Phillips at Deptford in London. Her name, mariquita, (literally, "Little Mary") means ladybird in Spanish.

Moberly studied in Germany and under Carolus-Duran in Paris. She painted portraits, figure studies, animals and landscapes in oils, watercolours and pastels. Moberly was a member of the New Society of Artists and exhibited at the Royal Academy in London, with the New Watercolour Society and at both the Royal Hibernian Academy and the Royal West of England Academy in Bristol. She lived in Epsom, and later Mitcham.

In March 2013, a number of her watercolour paintings, in private possession, of a variety of subjects, were shown in the BBC television programme Antiques Roadshow. These included a 1918 self-portrait and a picture of a dog that reputedly belonged to Ernest Shackleton, along with photographs of her paintings of dogs known to be his.

Her works are in a number of public collections, including The Secret Path in the Russell-Cotes Art Gallery & Museum.

She died in Mitcham, Surrey, on 1 November 1937, one day before her 82nd birthday.
