= Alfred Jonniaux =

Belgian painter

- Born: 1882; Brussels, Belgium
- Died: 1974 (aged 91–92)
- Occupation: Portrait Painter
- Known for: Paintings of Justice Owens J. Roberts, Kenneth Royall and Franklin D. Roosevelt.

Alfred Jonniaux (22 November 1882—1974) was a Belgian portrait painter who worked in London and the United States of America.

== Career ==
He was born in Brussels, Belgium, where he studied at the Académie Royale des Beaux-Arts. He worked in Paris and established a successful career as a portraitist in London, with a studio in Yeoman's Row, Chelsea. He painted the portraits of society figures, and members of the European aristocracy and royal families. Portraits of the Mander family are in the collection at Owlpen Manor, Gloucestershire. Jonniaux was a member of the New Society of Artists.

Following the Nazi occupation of Belgium during World War II, he fled to the United States of America, and became an American citizen in 1946. During his first ten years in America, he established studios in San Francisco and Washington, D.C. His exhibitions led to many portrait commissions from leading figures in all spheres of American life. Among the prominent figures he painted were Justice Owens J. Roberts, Kenneth Royall and Franklin D. Roosevelt, whose portrait was hung until recent years in the Roosevelt Room in the White House.

His papers are held at the Smithsonian Institution.
