= Daisy Radcliffe Beresford =

British painter (1879–1939)

- Born: 1879; Dalston, London.
- Died: 1940
- Education: Heatherley School of Fine Art; Royal Academy Schools
- Known for: portraits, landscapes and interiors
- Spouse: Frank Beresford (m. 1910)

Daisy Radcliffe Beresford (née Clague, c. 1879–10 November 1939) was a British painter and decorative artist who was known for her portraits, landscapes and interiors.

== Life ==
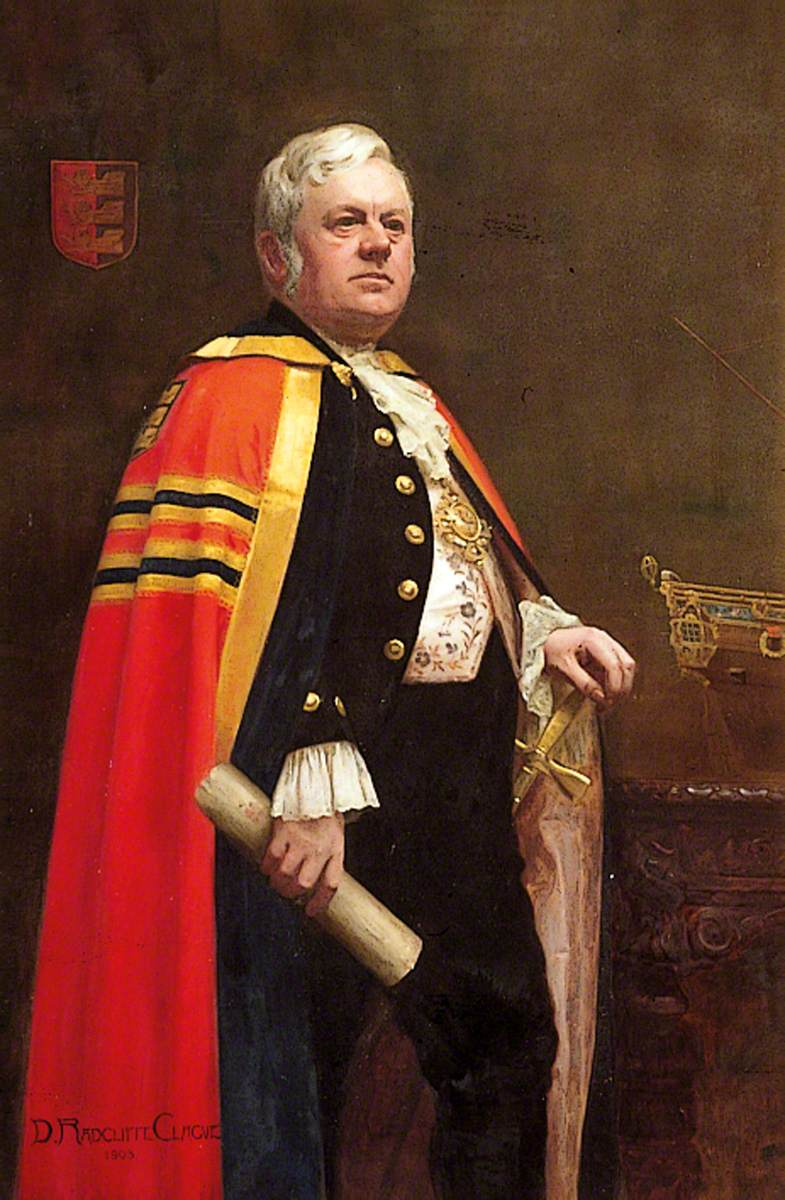
Portrait of Joseph Robert Diggle by Beresford

Beresford was born in 1879 in Dalston, London. She married the painter Frank Beresford (1881–1967) in 1910 and they had two daughters. Their daughters both followed their parents into careers in art.

Beresford was educated at the Heatherley School of Fine Art and at the Royal Academy Schools, where she won 3 silver and 2 bronze medals. Fellow students in her cohort included Vanessa Bell, Ethel Everett, Margery Snowdon and Sylvia Whitman. She obtained the Art Class Teacher's Certificate at the age of 13 and her Art Mistress' Certificate at age 16.

Beresford was a member of the New Society of Artists, from its formation in 1921. She later showed 12 paintings at the Royal Academy and one at the Society of Women Artists Exhibitors.

Some of Beresford's works are held in the collections of the Chris Beetles Gallery, Musée d'Orsay and Victoria and Albert Museum, whilst other pieces are on display at municipal institutions such as the Guildhall Art Gallery and Tenterden Town Hall, Kent.

Beresford died in 1939.
