= Herbert Ashwin Budd =

British painter

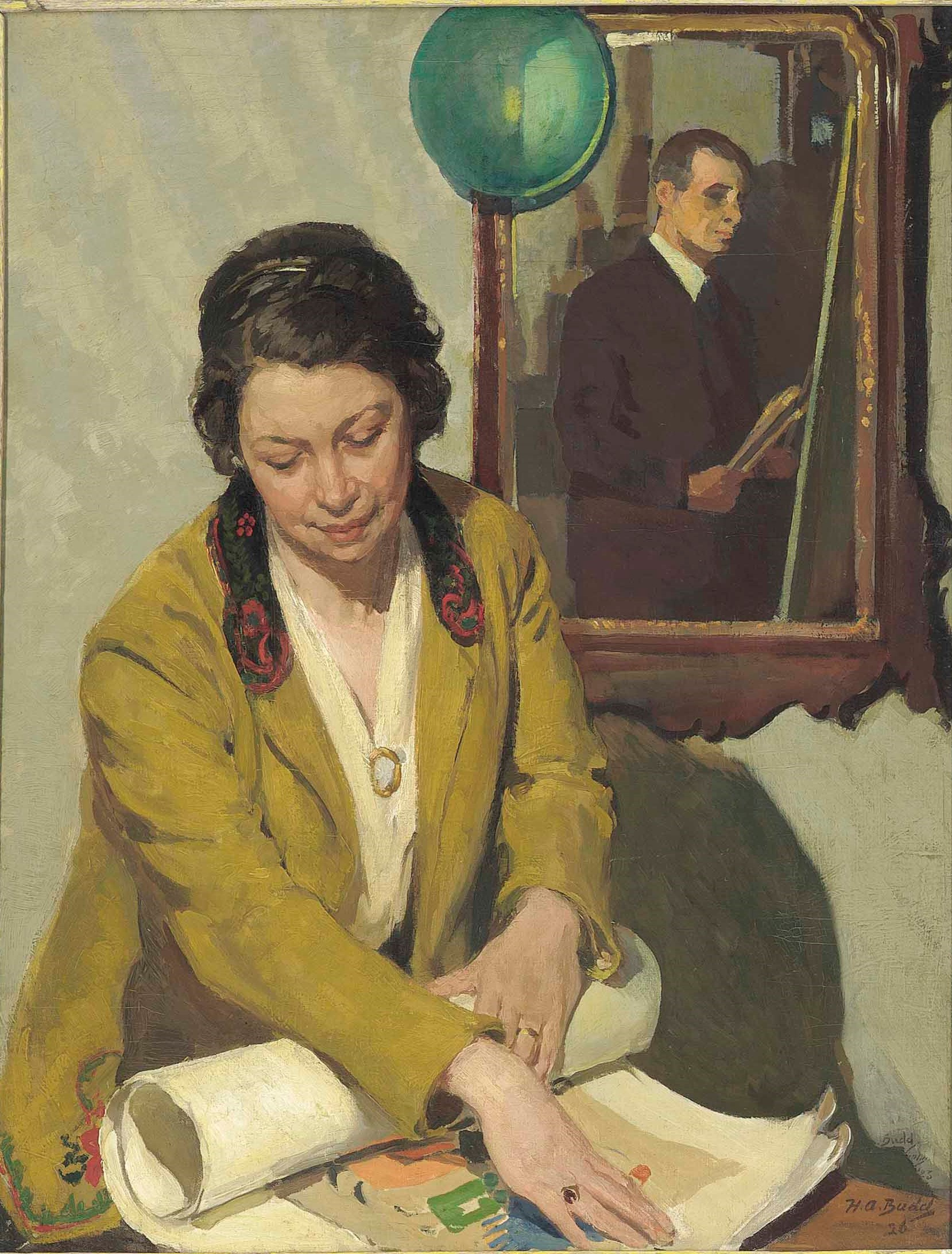
- Herbert Ashwin Budd (selfportrait in the mirror)
- Born: 1881; Staffordshire
- Died: 1950 (aged 68–69)
- Occupation: Painter
- Employer: London Transport

Herbert Ashwin Budd (1881–1950) was a British painter who painted portraits and landscapes in oils.

Budd was born 1881 in Staffordshire. He worked for London Transport in 1930s, designing posters. He was an associate of the Royal College of Art from 1907 and exhibited at the New English Art Club and Royal Academy. He was a member of the Royal Institute of Oil Painters from 1921; a member of the New Society of Artists in the same year, and was given an Honourable Mention at the 1927 Paris Salon. He taught at St Martin's School of Art from 1929 to 1949.

He died in 1950. His works are in the collections of the Imperial War Museum, Royal Society of Chemistry, City of London Corporation, Potteries Museum & Art Gallery, and others.

A bromide print of a photographic portrait of Budd, by Elliott & Fry, is in the National Portrait Gallery.

== Paintings by Budd (selection) ==
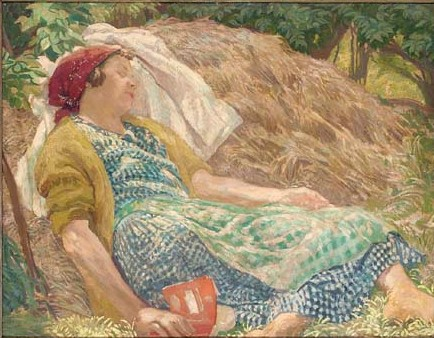
The end of the story

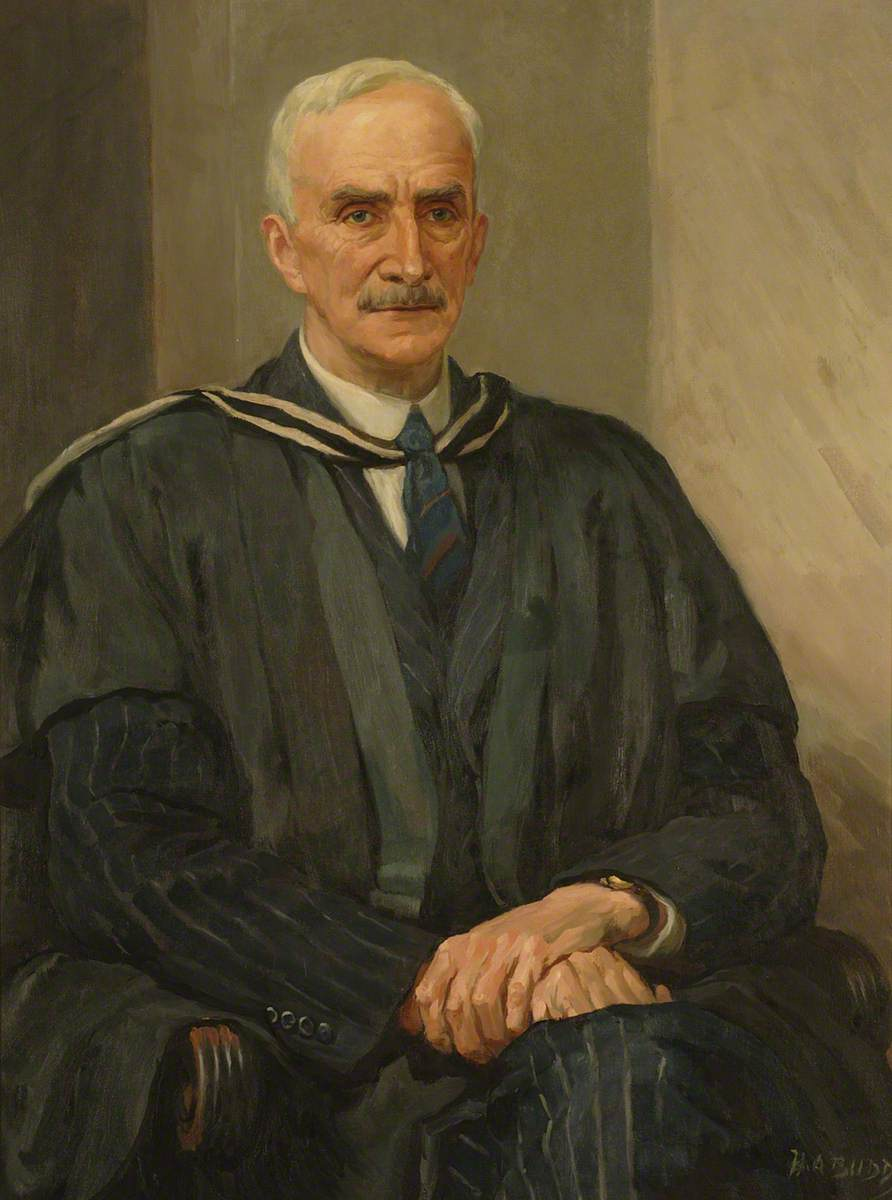
Francis Richard Dale

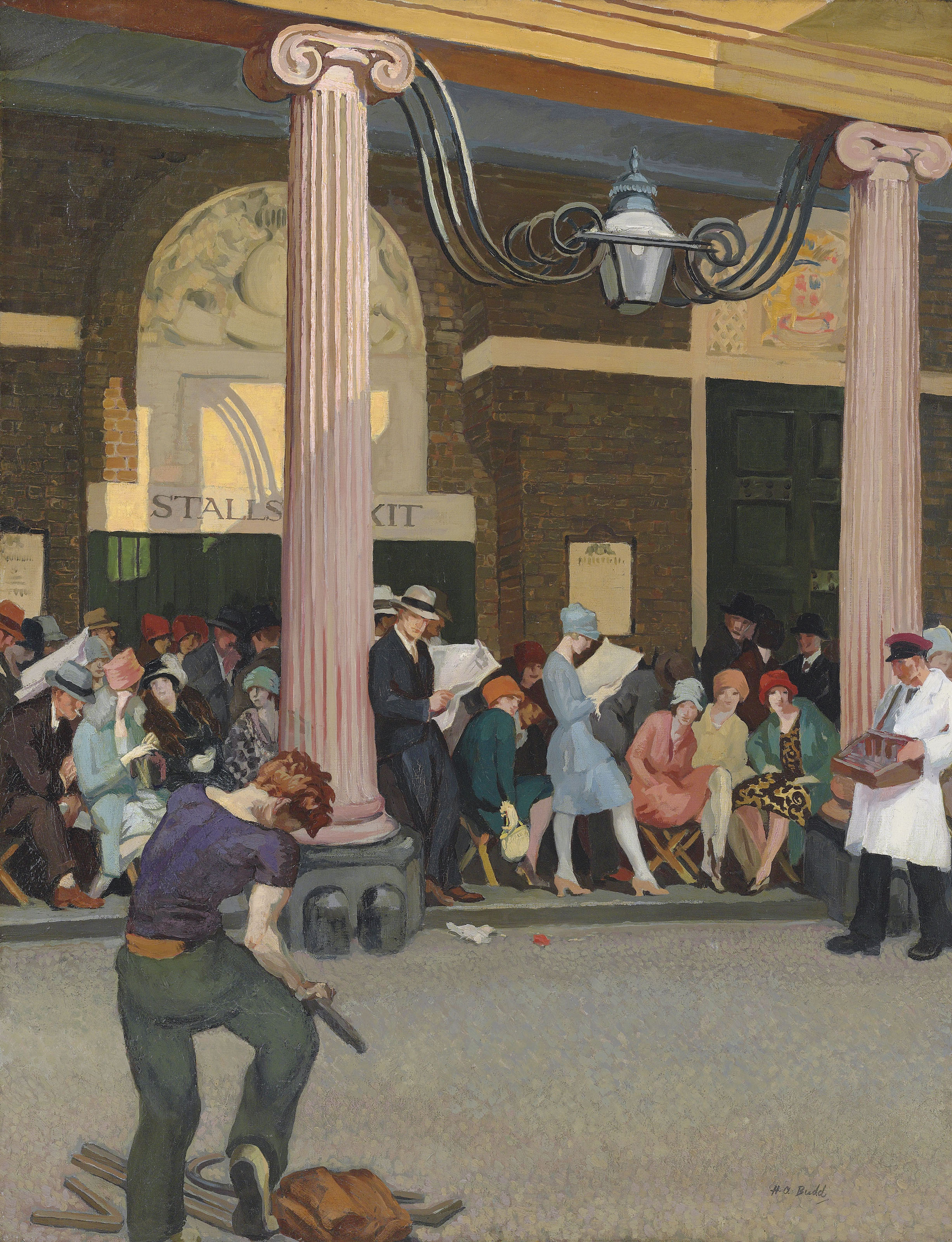
Travel to the theatre

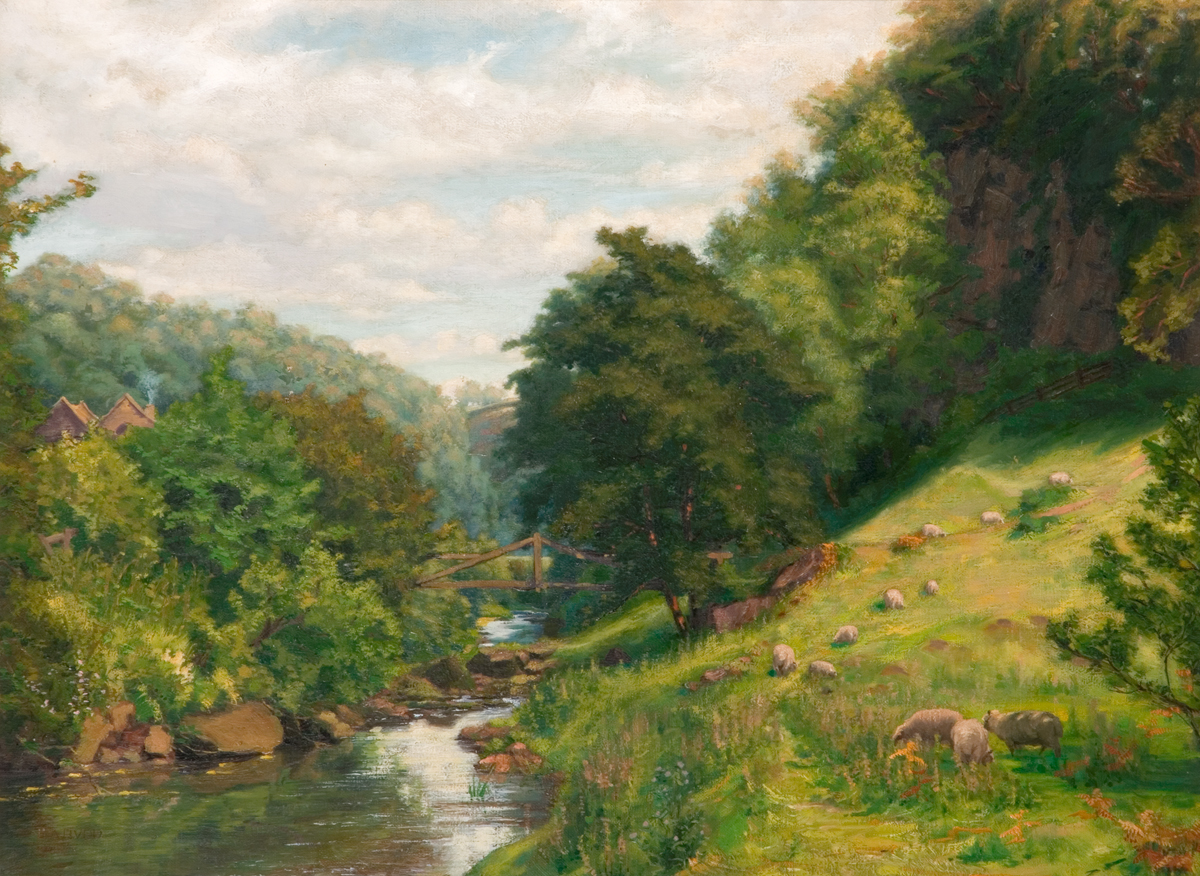
View on the Churnet
