= Frank Beresford =

British painter

- Beresford at work
- Born: Frank Ernest Beresford; 30 August 1881; Derby, England
- Died: 25 May 1967; Rye, Sussex, England
- Education: Derby School of Art; St John's Wood Art School; Royal Academy Schools
- Spouse: Daisy Radcliffe Beresford (m. 1910)

Frank Ernest Beresford (30 August 1881 – 25 May 1967) was a British painter from Derby, England. He is best known for his painting, The Princes' Vigil.

== Biography ==
Beresford was born in Derby in 1881 and had a long artistic education. He first studied at the Derby School of Art, then St John's Wood Art School, and finally at the Royal Academy Schools. His talent was rewarded with a travel scholarship that took him to Asia. From 1906 he returned to exhibit at the Royal Academy. Beresford was a member of the New Society of Artists.

In 1936, Beresford made the only painting of the Princes' keeping vigil with their father's body overnight. It was titled The Princes' Vigil: 12.15am, January 28, 1936, and it was bought by Queen Mary who gave it to King Edward VIII on his birthday. Before the war started, Beresford's first wife, the artist Daisy Radcliffe Clague, died.

During World War II, Beresford was only the second person to be awarded an Exceptional Service Award from the United States Air Force, which also has some of his paintings on permanent display. Beresford was a war artist for both the American and British air forces. His portraits include those of the Spitfire designer, Reginald Joseph Mitchell.

Beresford married again in 1949. He repeated his pre-war painting of royalty lying in state when King George VI and Queen Mary died in 1952 and 1953, respectively, but tastes had changed and this time they were not exhibited.

Frank Beresford's works include depictions of two kings (King George V and King George VI) and a queen (Queen Elizabeth), and in the collection in his home county there is a portrait of George Herbert Strutt owned by Belper Town Council and a view of Dovedale in Derby Art Gallery.
