= Mabel Mary Spanton =

English painter

Mabel Mary Spanton RWS (1 December 1874 — ca. 1940) was a British landscape painter who primarily worked in watercolour.

== Life and work ==
Mabel Mary Spanton was born in Hanley, Staffordshire on 1 December 1874, the daughter of Dr. William Dunnet Spanton, F.R.C.S. She studied art at Hanley School of Art under J. S. Cartlidge, and also in Newlyn, Cornwall under Stanhope Forbes, R.A.

Spanton was elected as a member of the prestigious Royal Watercolour Society in 1927. She travelled and painted extensively across the Continent including the Balearic Islands in 1925, Italy, Spain, the Netherlands and Belgium in 1928, and in England and Scotland in 1938. During the early 1920s Spanton lived in both Hastings and Bexhill, Sussex before spending the majority of her later years abroad. She died at The Seven Stars Inn, South Tawton, near Okehampton on 28 January 1947.

== Exhibitions ==
She exhibited extensively including in London at the Royal Academy; London Salon; Royal Society of British Artists; Society of Women Artists; Royal Institute of Painters in Watercolours; New Society of Artists; Women's International Art Club; Dudley Gallery and New Dudley Gallery; Goupil Gallery; Walker Gallery. Elsewhere her work was exhibited at the Royal Scottish Academy; Royal Hibernian Academy; Royal Cambrian Academy; Royal Scottish Society of Painters in Watercolours; Glasgow Institute of the Fine Arts; Abbey Gallery, Stoke-on-Trent; Royal Society of Artists Birmingham; and at Bristol, Derby, Oldham, Hull, Newlyn, Southport, and Aberdeen.
