= Bess Norriss =

Australian artist (1878–1939)

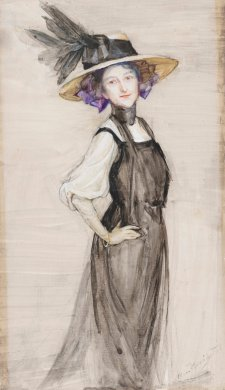
- self-portrait of Norriss
- Born: 17 May 1878; Melbourne
- Died: January 1939 (aged 60); London
- Education: Melbourne Art Gallery School; Slade School of Fine Art
- Known for: Painting, drawing

Elizabeth May Norriss, later Bess Norriss Tait, (17 May 1878 – January 1939) was an Australian artist.

== Life ==
Norriss was born in Melbourne, Australia in 1878. She studied at Melbourne Art Gallery School and in 1905 at the Slade School of Fine Art in London. She specialised in watercolours and miniatures. In 1907, she was made a member of the Royal Society of Miniature Painters. She became a member of the British Watercolour Society and Society of Women Artists.

In 1908, she married the Australian entrepreneur J. Nevin Tait (1876–1961), the UK representative of and partner in the theatrical company J. & N. Tait. They travelled to South Africa in 1909 before returning to Australia. The National Portrait Gallery hold a self-portrait c.1900-10.

Norriss Street in the Canberra suburb of Chisholm is named in her honour.

== Life in London ==
In 1911, she returned to London and resided in Church Street, Chelsea. She exhibited at the Royal Academy of Arts, the New Society of Artists and the Paris Salon between 1908 and 1936, the Grosvenor Gallery and the Goupil Gallery. She was commissioned to paint the miniatures in Queen Mary's Dolls' House, produced 1921-4, currently on display at Windsor Castle. Francis Derwent Wood's bronze bust of her (1922) was purchased by the Chantrey Bequest for the Tate in 1926. A large one-man show of her work was held at Walker's Galleries in 1938. She died in London in 1939.

== Work in collections ==
Her work is in the collection of the Art Gallery of New South Wales.
