= Stella Rebecca Crofts =

British artist

- Born: 9 January 1898; Nottingham
- Died: 1964 (aged 65–66)
- Education: Central School of Arts and Crafts; Royal College of Art
- Known for: Sculpture, pottery, painting

Stella Rebecca Crofts (9 January 1898 – 1964) was a British artist who had a prolific career creating paintings, sculpture and pottery.

== Biography ==
Crofts was born in Nottingham and raised at Ilford in Essex. Due to extended periods of ill-health as a child, Crofts was largely home-schooled before studying at the Central School of Arts and Crafts in central London from 1916 to 1922 and then spending a year at the Royal College of Art where she studied pottery and sculpture. After graduating, Crofts returned to Essex and set up a studio with a kiln. She first exhibited at the Royal Academy in 1925 and went on to have works shown in Venice, Milan and Toronto. In Paris, Crofts was awarded a silver medal at the Exposition des Arts Decoratifs in 1925.

Crofts was elected an Associate of the Society of Women Artists in 1924, becoming a full member in 1925 and exhibiting over 200 works at the Society during her career. She continued to exhibit at the Royal Academy and had a solo show at the Redfern Gallery in 1926 and also showed with the Women's International Art Club and became an elected associate of the Royal Society of Miniature Painters, Sculptors and Gravers. She exhibited at the annual exhibition of the New Society of Artists in 1932.

During her career Crofts often created paintings and sculptures of a wide range of animals, particularly birds, but also painted human portraits. She modelled animal groups then glazed and fired them in her own kiln, using a variety of techniques, to create statuettes, reliefs and earthenware pieces. Examples of Crofts artworks are held by the Victoria & Albert Museum in London, by Nottingham Castle Museum, Manchester City Art Gallery, by the Potteries Museum & Art Gallery in Stoke-on-Trent and the Museum of Decorative Arts in Milan.
