= Walter Monckton Keesey =

British architect, artist and etcher

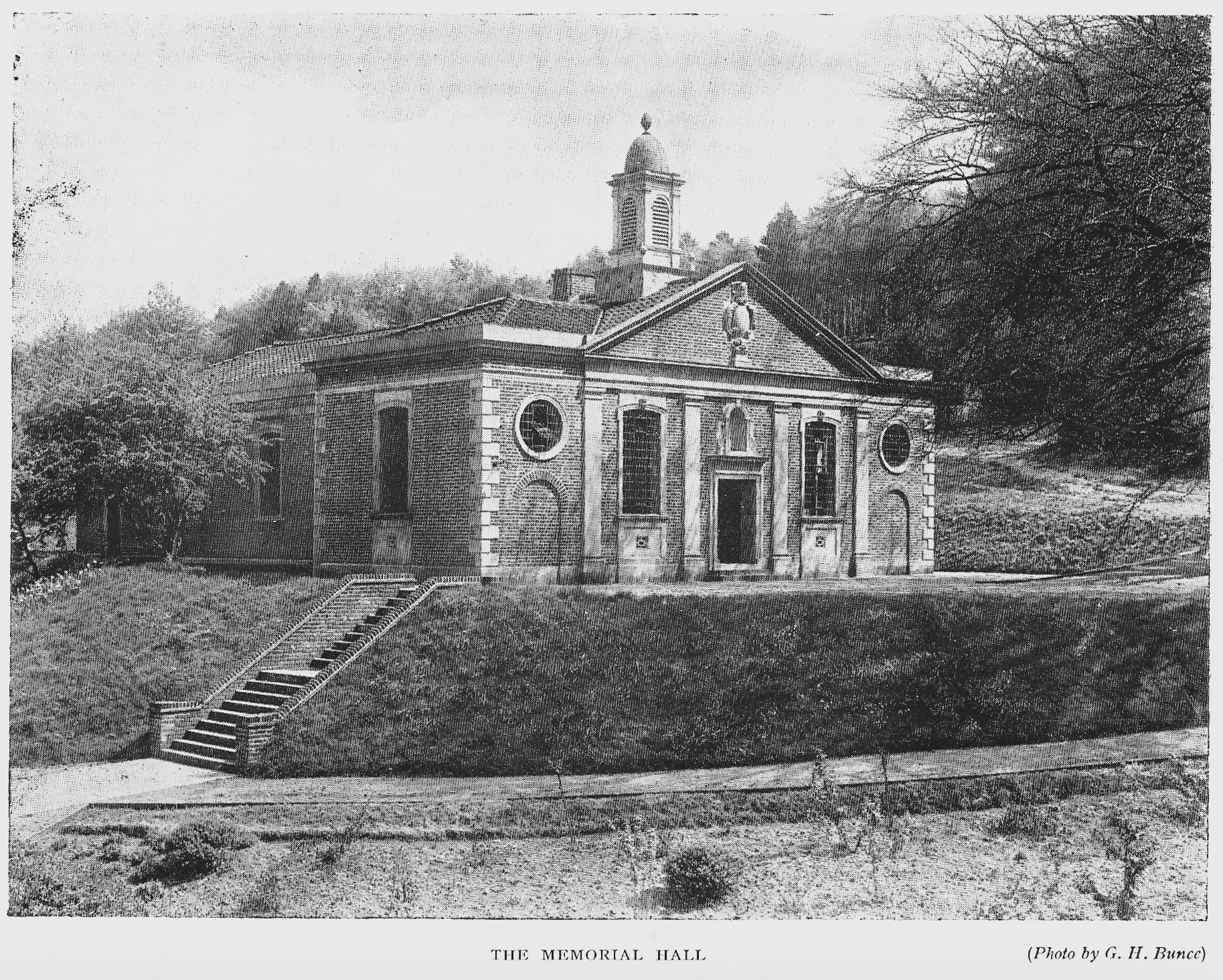
The Memorial Hall at Caterham School, built in 1925, was designed by Keesey to honour former pupils that had died in World War I.

Walter Monckton Keesey OBE (1887–1970), was an English architect, artist and etcher. Accomplished in architectural drawing, he exhibited etchings, drawings and watercolours at the Royal Academy for over 50 years.

== Parentage and education ==
Keesey was born in Croydon, Surrey on 16 June 1887, the younger son of George Walton Keesey, a Congregational minister, and Annie née Kimber. He attended St Olave's, Southwark, and then Caterham School, a boarding school for the sons of Congregational clergy. From there he went to Woolwich School of Art, and was on the teaching staff there in 1906. He won an exhibition to the Royal College of Art, attending 1907-11. He studied in Rome in 1911. His first graduate position was as Art Master at the Architectural Association.

== First World War ==
He joined the Royal Engineers in December 1914 as a 2nd Lieutenant. Most of his service was in France, but latterly he was with the British Expeditionary Force in northern Italy. In June 1918, he was gazetted as a Temporary Captain, and awarded the Military Cross "for valuable services rendered in connection with Military Operations in Italy". He left the Army in 1919 with the rank of Major.

Drawings from this period depict scenes in northern France (including a 1916 study of one of the first tanks on the Somme) and Italy.

== Career ==
He returned to the Architectural Association after the war and remained on its teaching staff until 1925. For several years from 1924 he was in commercial partnership with the architects W J Kieffer and H S Fleming in London, while retaining a strong interest in art education, notably architectural drawing. By 1928 he had been appointed His Majesty's Inspector (HMI) for Art in the Birmingham area, and was an active public speaker in this field. He served on the RIBA Council in the 1930s, and was for a time its Honorary Librarian. He was also a member of the New Society of Artists. Upon retiring as an HMI, in 1950 he was awarded the OBE for his services to Art.

== Notable architectural commissions ==
- War Memorial Hall at Caterham School (1924)
- Orange Street Congregational Church, London WC2 (1927)

== Artistic output ==
Between 1912 and 1966, he exhibited at least 23 works at the Royal Academy. Examples of his architectural drawings and other work are held in the V&A, the RIBA Library, the London Metropolitan Archive, and public collections in Cheltenham and Dunedin. As “Mr. W. M. Keesey, Inspector of Art Schools, Board of Education”, he was credited by the Bank of England for designing the foliage device on the back of the Series A £1 and 10-shilling notes, first issued in 1928.

== Publications ==
Between 1913 and 1915, he produced a series of books of sketches for A & C Black, covering the buildings of Cambridge, Harrow and Canterbury. In a similar style, for Trust Houses Ltd he contributed numerous illustrations for Tales of Old Inns: The History, Legend and Romance of Some of Our Older Hostelries (1927), the sketches being widely reused in other promotional literature and as postcards.

He also undertook smaller commissions, sketching rural tourist attractions such as hotels and tea-rooms for production as publicity postcards. He occasionally took on business commissions, for example his Eight Etchings and Some Particulars Concerning London’s New Motor-Buses, a 1920 publication for the London General Omnibus Co. He also contributed to more substantial works, such as Industry and art education on the continent (1935) for HMSO, and a chapter on architectural drawing in Greenhalgh’s Modern Building Construction textbook (c. 1946).

== Retirement ==
He retired with his wife (née Jane Helena Swinglehurst) to Cheltenham in 1957, remaining active as a painter, mainly of watercolours, and in 1961 becoming President of the Cheltenham Group of Artists. After his wife’s death in 1963, he moved back to the Midlands. He died at Nottingham General Hospital on 4 December 1970, aged 83.

== Exhibitions ==
Besides the Royal Academy for over 50 years, he also exhibited at the Royal Society of Painter-Etchers and Engravers (he had been an Associate of the RE since 1924); at Walker's Gallery, Bond Street; at Birmingham; and abroad. After his death, there was a retrospective exhibition at Cheltenham Art Gallery & Museum (1972) and another at Oakwood Arts Centre, Maldon, Essex (1983).
