= Orange Street Congregational Church =

Coordinates: 51.5096°N 0.1296°W

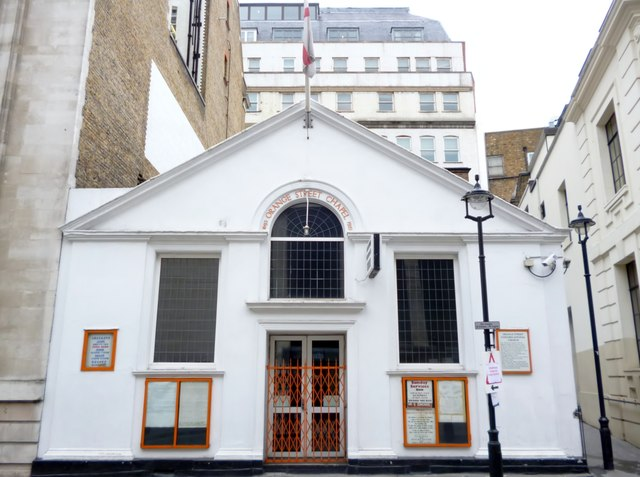
Orange Street Congregational Church, Orange Street WC2

Orange Street Congregational Church (formerly known as Orange Street Chapel and historically as Leicester Fields Chapel) is a Nonconformist church in the parish of St Martin-in-the-Fields, Westminster, London. Founded in 1693 as a French Reformed (Huguenot) chapel, it later became an Anglican church and then, later, Congregationalist. The original chapel was demolished and rebuilt in the twentieth century.

== History ==
=== Huguenots ===
Orange Street Chapel was founded in the seventeenth century by Huguenot refugees, French protestants, who settled in London following the Revocation of the Edict of Nantes in 1685. The congregation initially began worshipping in Glasshouse Street in 1688, but moved in 1693 to a newly built chapel near Leicester Fields, as it was then known. This later became known as Orange Street Chapel. The chapel was part of a wider network of Huguenot institutions in London, alongside churches in Soho, Spitalfields and elsewhere, which preserved French-language worship and in a Reformed tradition.

=== Anglican evangelical period ===
In 1776 the Huguenot congregation relinquished the building, which was taken over by members of the Church of England for use as an English-language evangelical chapel. During this phase Orange Street was one of several semi-independent chapels in the West End associated with the wider emerging evangelical movement in the Church of England in the later eighteenth century. The most notable minister of this period was Augustus Montague Toplady (1740–1778), an evangelical Calvinist cleric best known as the author of the hymn "Rock of Ages". Toplady's ministry at Orange Street coincided with his vigorous defence of Calvinist doctrine and his disputes with John Wesley and other Arminian evangelicals.

=== Congregational period ===
In 1787 the chapel passed to the Congregationalists, who were Nonconformists. The building was thereafter known as Orange Street Congregational Church and formed part of the growing network of Independent churches in London during the late eighteenth and nineteenth centuries. Although the congregational union disbanded in 1956, the church retains the name "congregational".

The congregation developed a range of activities typical of urban Nonconformity, including Sunday schools and philanthropic initiatives. Jemima Luke (1813–1906), a Congregationalist hymn-writer and Sunday school teacher, was associated with the church's educational work. She is best known for the children's hymn "I think when I read that sweet story of old".

A review of Richard W. Free's Lux Benigna (1888) in The Spectator described Orange Street as "the Temple of Leicester Fields" and drew attention to its evolution from a refugee church to a Dissenting chapel.

== Architecture ==
The original chapel was a late seventeenth-century preaching house of relatively plain design, characteristic of Reformed and Nonconformist buildings of the period. Contemporary descriptions and later illustrations suggest a simple rectangular meeting space with galleries, adapted over time.

=== Isaac Newton's house ===
The chapel was adjacent to 35 St Martin's Street, a house that was erected in 1710, and which became the London residence of Sir Isaac Newton while he served as Master of the Mint. Newton lived there from 1710 until his death in 1727. Newton's house was condemned as unsafe in 1913, and the combined site was eventually acquired by the City of Westminster for redevelopment. the location is now occupied by Westminster Reference Library and associated buildings.

== Notable ministers and members ==
=== Augustus Montague Toplady ===
Augustus Montague Toplady served as one of the principal ministers of Orange Street during its Anglican evangelical phase. He is chiefly remembered for composing the hymn "Rock of Ages," first sung in this church, and for his vigorous defence of Calvinist theology against Arminian opponents, especially John Wesley.

=== Jemima Luke ===
Jemima Luke, a Congregationalist hymn-writer and educationalist, was associated with the Sunday school work of Orange Street during its later Congregational period. She is best known for the children's hymn "I think when I read that sweet story of old".

== British Israelism ==
In the twentieth century, adherents of the British Israel movement adopted Orange Street Congregational Chaper as an official place of worship and it gained a reputation as an unofficial hub church for British Israelism.

== Bibliography ==
- Cottrell-Boyce, Aidan (August 2020). Israelism in Modern Britain. Taylor & Francis Group. ISBN 978-0-429-35548-6.
- Cottrell-Boyce, Aidan (21 October 2021). "British Israelism". In Crossley, James; Lockhart, Alastair (eds.). Critical Dictionary of Apocalyptic and Millenarian Movements. doi:10.17863/CAM.121481.
- Free, Richard William (1888). Lux benigna, being the history of Orange Street Chapel : otherwise called Leicester Fields Chapel occupied 1693-1776 by the French refugee church founded in Glasshouse Street in 1688; 1776-1787 by members of the Church of England; 1787–1888 by Congregational Dissenters. London : W. B. Whittingham.
- "Huguenot Traces". The Huguenots of Spitalfields. n.d.
- Masters, Walter E. (1910). The Huguenot church and Sir Isaac Newton's house : being the history of Orange street chapel, known as Leicester Fields chapel from 1688 to 1775, and of Sir Isaac Newton's house adjoining. London: Reynolds.
- Middleton, Erasmus (1786). Biographia Evangelica: or, an historical account of the lives and deaths of the most eminent and evangelical authors or preachers, ... By the Rev. Erasmus Middleton, ... 1779: Vol 4 : Middleton, Erasmus : Free Download, Borrow, and Streaming.
- Moss, Kevin (2024). AUGUSTUS MONTAGUE TOPLADY (1740-78) AND THE LIMITS OF THE EVANGELICAL ENLIGHTENMENT (PDF) (PhD thesis). Aberystwyth University.
- "Orange Street Church". London Remembers. n.d.
- Ryle, John Charles (13 August 2015). The Christian Leaders of the Last Century: Or, England a Hundred Years Ago. by the Rev. J.C. Ryle. Creative Media Partners, LLC. ISBN 978-1-297-83066-2.
- "The Spectator". archive.spectator.co.uk. 22 June 1889.
- Wright, Thomas (1911). Augustus M. Toplady and Contemporary Hymnwriters. Farncombe & Son.
