= Art Amateur =

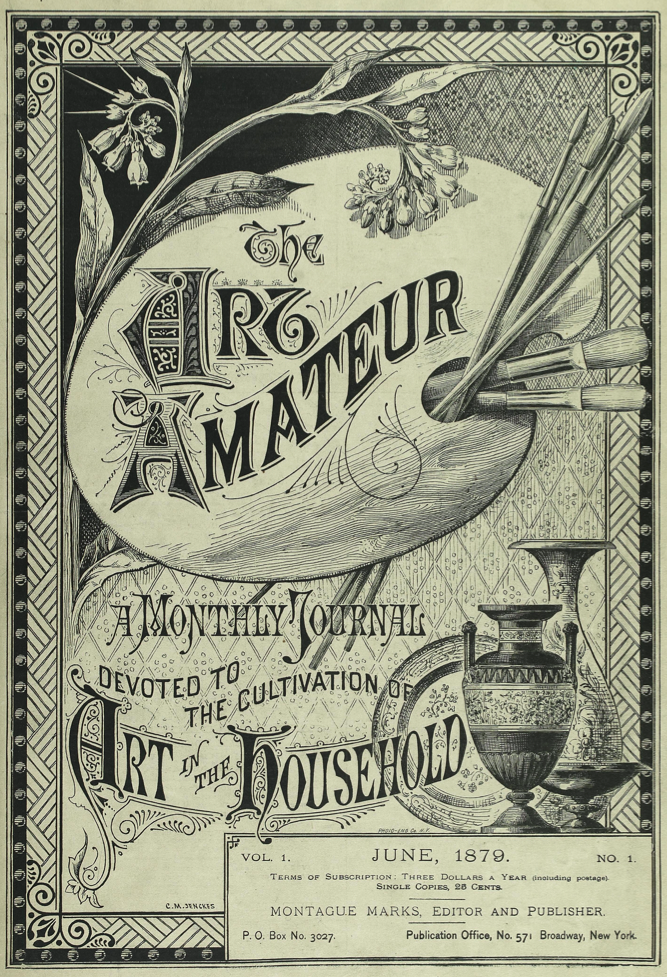
The Art Amateur, 1879

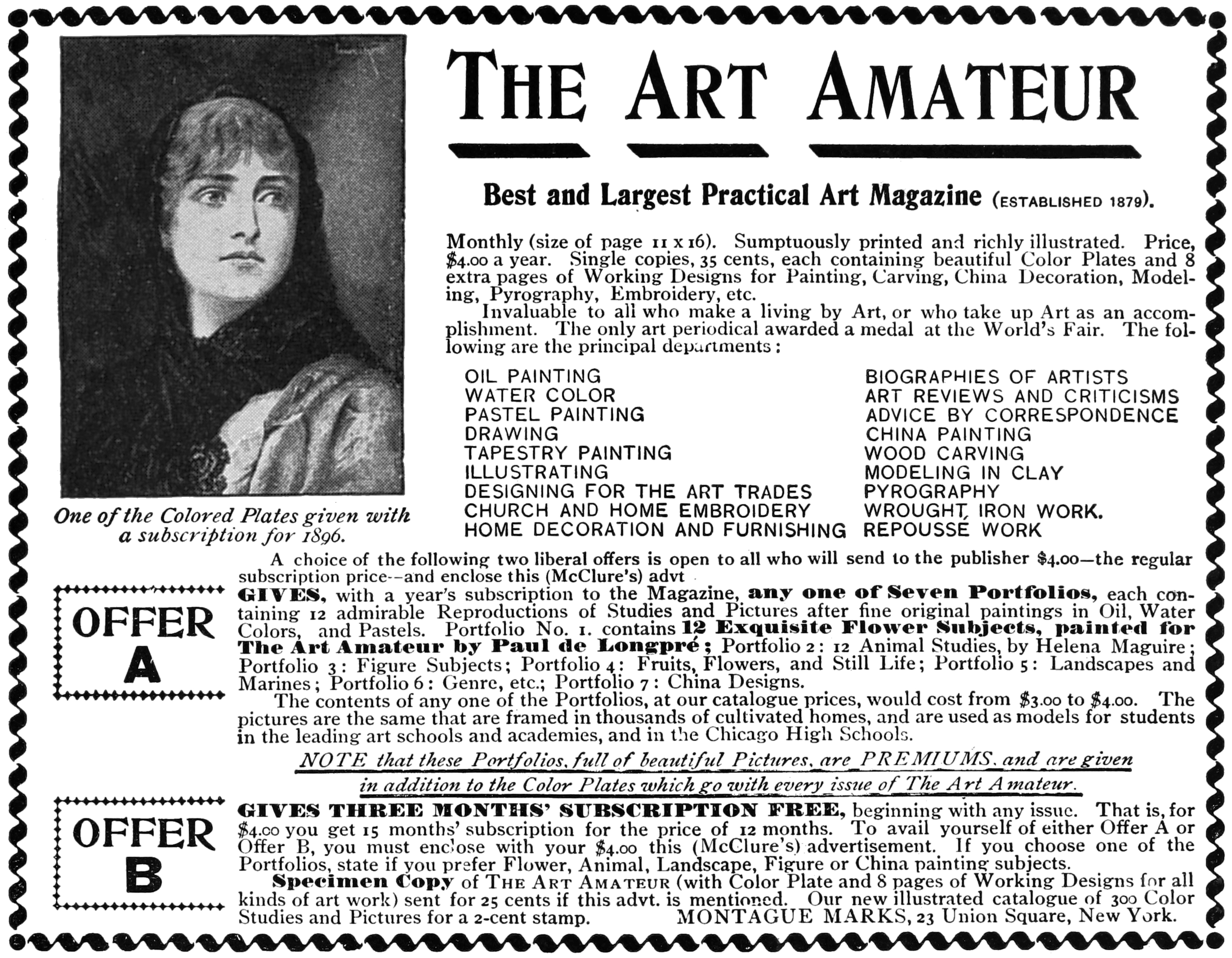
Advertisement in the Jan, 1896 issue of McClure's Magazine for Art Amateur.

The Art Amateur (1879–1903) was an American magazine published in New York in the 19th century. Editors included Montague Marks and John W. Van Oost.
