= Jemima Luke =

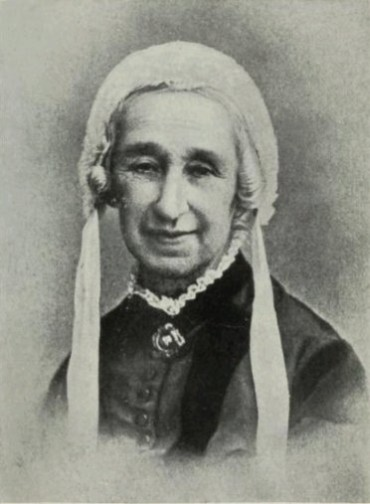
Jemima Luke, from the front piece of her 1900 autobiography

Jemima Luke (1813–1906) was an English writer of hymns, religious studies and biographies during the Victorian era. She is best known for her children's hymn "I think when I read that sweet story of old".

== Early life and education ==
Jemima Luke was born Jemima Thompson on 19 August 1813 in Colebrook Terrace, Islington, London to the philanthropist Thomas Thompson (1785–1865), and his wife Elizabeth Pinckney (died 1837). Her father, who had the same birthday as Jemima, made a fortune on the London Stock Exchange, and retired while still a young man. He was an early prominent member of the London Missionary Society, the British and Foreign Bible Society, and one of the founders in 1818 of the British and Foreign Sailors Society (originally the Port of London Society), and in 1819 of the Home Missionary Society. Jemima was educated at home and began her literary career at the age of thirteen when she wrote some verses that were published anonymously in the Juvenile Friend magazine. She then studied under the well-known Christian writer Caroline Fry, who was editor of The Assistant of Education (periodical).

== Career ==
Inspired by her father's work with various missionary societies, Jemima decided after the 1837 death of her mother to do missionary work in India, and managed to convince her reluctant father to sponsor her, but when she became ill just before embarking on the adventure, her father withdrew his support.

Remaining at her father's home in Taunton, Somerset, Jemima was teaching hymns to school children in nearby Blagdon, when one summer morning in 1841 while riding the stage from Taunton to Wellington, she composed some verses on the back of an envelope for a hymn that she named "The Child's Desire." When her hymn proved to be very popular with the children she was working with, her father published it in the Sunday School Teacher's Magazine (1841), which led to her becoming editor from 1841 to 1845 of The Missionary Repository, a new missionary magazine for children. Her hymn next appeared untitled and anonymously in 1853 as hymn no. 874 (in 3 stanzas of 8 lines) in the widely read The Leeds Hymn-book, which led to subsequent publication in a number of Victorian hymnals. Because it appeared without a title in the Leeds book, it came to be known by the opening verse of "I think when I read that sweet story of old,", or simply either "The Old Sweet Story" or "The Story of Old". Although her fame generally rests on this one hymn, she went one to write several books, including, The Female Jesuit (1851), The Broad Road and the Narrow Way, a Memoir of Eliza Ann Harris of Clifton (1859), Winter Work (1864), Sketches of the life and character of Thomas Thompson (1868), which is a biography of her father, and her autobiography, The Early Years of my Life (1900).

== Later years and death ==
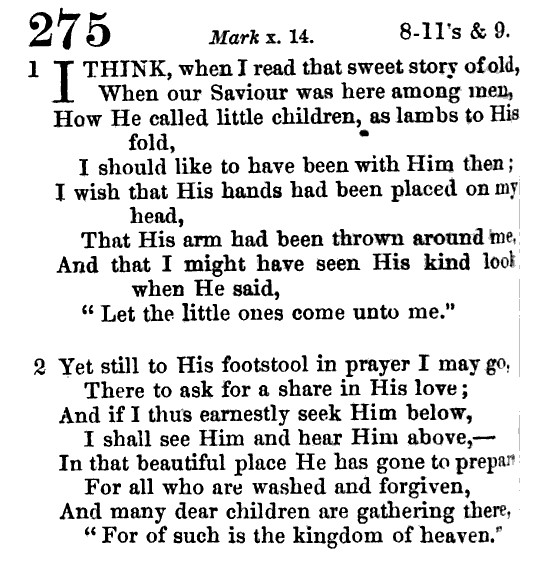
Jemima Luke's hymn as it appeared in 1858 in "The Sunday School Hymn Book: for the Leeds Sunday School Union"

Jemima married on 10 May 1843 in London the Reverend Samuel Luke (1809–1868), a Congregationalist minister who became pastor in 1847 of the Orange Street Church near Trafalgar Square in London. They had two children – Jemima Elizabeth Luke (1844–1876) and Samuel Arnold Luke (1850–1903) – before moving in 1853 to Bristol City, when Jemima's husband became minister of the Hope Chapel at the Clifton Down Congregational Church. She remained in Bristol until her husband's 1868 death, after which she moved to Newport in the Isle of Wight, where she became known as a passionate nonconformist. She acquired a reputation in her later years as being one of the oldest passive resisters in England, generally protesting various issues regarding children's education. She died at the age of 92 on 2 February 1906 at Newport.
