= Gordon Coutts =

Scottish-American artist (1868–1937)

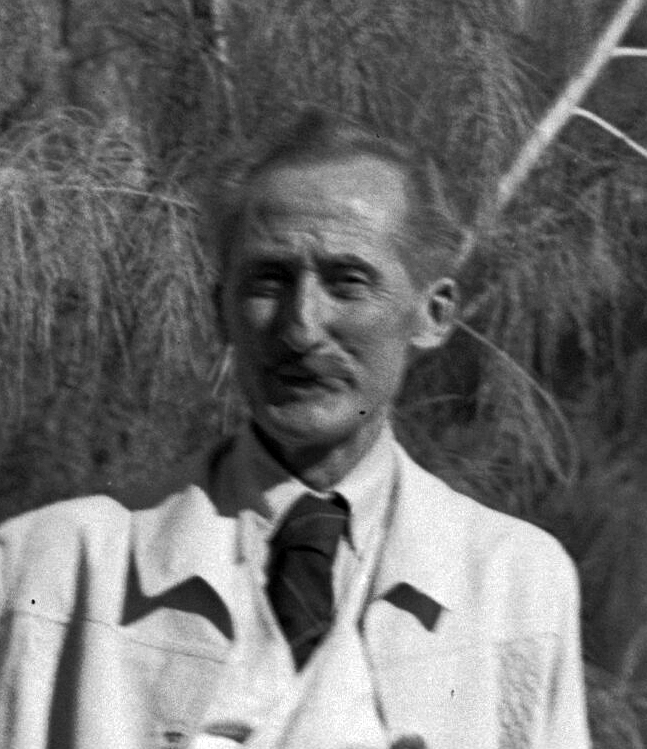
- Coutts in 1936
- Born: 3 October 1868; Aberdeen, Scotland
- Died: 21 February 1937 (aged 68); Palm Springs, California, US
- Occupation: Painter
- Spouses: Jessie Benson (m. 1888; div. 1903); Alice Grey Hobbs (m. 1904; div. 1917); Gertrude Russell (m. 1918)
- Children: 3

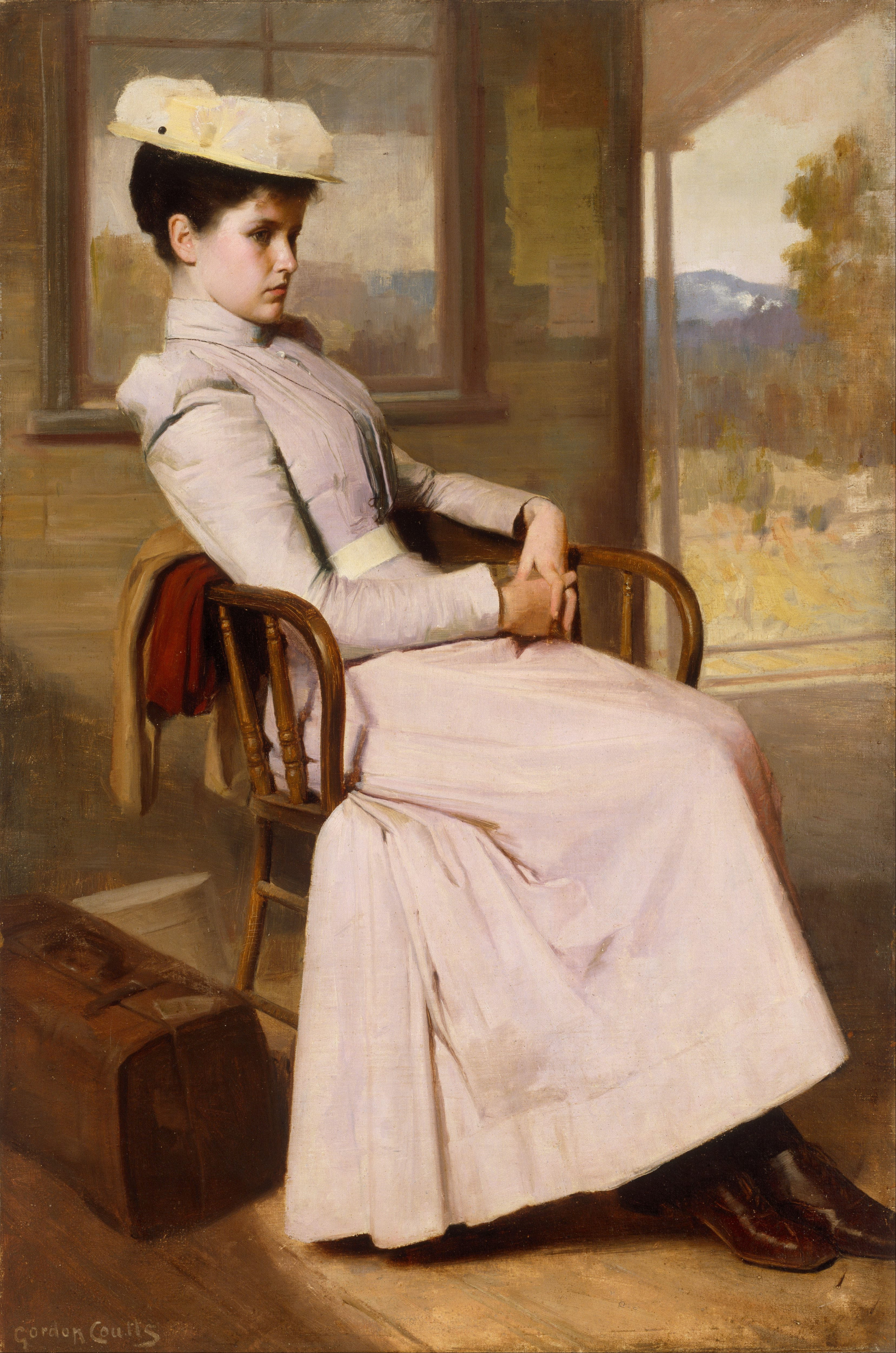
Waiting, which was influenced by Tom Roberts (Art Gallery of New South Wales)

Gordon Harrower Coutts (3 October 1868 – 21 February 1937) was a Scottish artist internationally known for his desert landscapes, Moroccan figures, portraits, and nudes. He spent time in Australia, Morocco, and the United States.

== Biography ==
Coutts was born in Aberdeen, Scotland, on 3 October 1868. He began his art studies at the Glasgow School of Art in 1881, where he became friends with the Irish painter John Lavery, before venturing south to study in London at the Royal Academy. He continued his studies at the Académie Julian, Paris, under Jules Joseph Lefebvre and Adolphe Déchenaud. He went to Australia with his brother David, and continued his studies at the National Gallery School in Melbourne from 1891 to 1893, becoming a teacher immediately afterwards. After this, he taught at the Art Society of New South Wales in Sydney. During his time in Australia, he had regular exhibits with the Victorian Artists Society and the Art Society of NSW.

Coutts moved to the United States in late 1902, first to Omaha, Nebraska, and then to San Francisco, where he became a member of the Bohemian Club. Coutts and his wife Alice, also a painter, purchased land across the Bay in Oakland in 1907, and he was later recorded as living in Piedmont.

From 1910, he and Alice travelled to numerous locations, including Paris, London, and Tangier, Morocco. Their works were exhibited at the Royal Academy, the Paris Salon, and numerous other shows. The outbreak of World War I forced them to return to the US, but Coutts went abroad again in 1916, this time by himself. The couple divorced two years later. Soon after, he met Gertrude Russell of Cleveland, Ohio, herself an artist and singer and 30 years younger than him, and they were married in New York.

The two of them spent time in Spain and Morocco, regularly making trips back to the United Kingdom, where he exhibited at various galleries. By 1920, they had returned to the US, settling in Pasadena, California, and in 1924 they moved to Palm Springs, hoping the drier desert air would be better for his tuberculosis.

There, they built a Moroccan-style house which they named "Dar Maroc" (also spelt "Dar Marroc"), and Coutts became one of Palm Springs's most famous residents. Dar Maroc played host to numerous celebrities over the years, including John Lavery, Winston Churchill, and Grant Wood.

Coutts died in Palm Springs on 21 February 1937 of a heart attack. In 1989, Dar Maroc was converted into a boutique hotel called the Korakia Pensione.

== Personal life ==
Coutts married his first wife Jessie Benson in 1888 in Glasgow. She accompanied him to Australia and they had one child, but they separated in 1901, and she sued him for maintenance and child support, with the court awarding her 35 shillings per week for the two of them. However, Coutts stopped making payments in October 1901, and when he decided to leave Australia in 1902, he attempted to evade the court order by purchasing a ticket under a false name. He was arrested in Wellington, New Zealand, for violating a recent law making it an offence for someone to avoid a maintenance order by leaving the state. At his trial, his attorney argued that Coutts could not be charged with the crime because when the law was passed, he was no longer a resident of Victoria. Given this, the prosecution conceded and filed a nolle prosequi motion to dismiss the case. The couple formally divorced in March 1903.

His second wife was fellow artist Alice Gray Hobbs (1879–1973), who was a student of his in Melbourne. They were married in San Francisco on 28 April 1904. (Note: It is unclear if she accompanied him to Omaha or if they reunited in San Francisco.)

In early 1918, Coutts was in Tangier, travelling alone, when he received a summons to a court in Reno, Nevada, where Alice had filed for divorce on the grounds of irreconcilable differences (Reno having the reputation of being "the divorce capital of the world"). This caught him by surprise. He rushed home, sending a telegraph message on the way to request a postponement so that he could arrive in time, which he did. He was persuaded not to challenge the request, and Alice remarried a few months later.

With his third wife, Gertrude, Coutts had two daughters, Jeane and Mary. Gertrude died in December 1937 as a result of an automobile accident. Legacy.com
