= Stephen Bonarjee =

British journalist (1912–2001)

Stephen Wilson Bonarjee (15 May 1912 - 14 September 2001) was a British journalist. He took over BBC Radio 4's Today programme in 1962 after it had begun in 1958. The Guardian said that "it was Bonarjee who brought current affairs to British breakfast-time radio".

Bonarjee attended Caterham, a British public school, from 1926 to 1929 and afterwards went on to read English at the University of St Andrews. Caterham created the annual Bonarjee Lecture in his memory.
