= Cambridge University Heraldic and Genealogical Society =

- Abbreviation: CUHAGS
- Predecessor: Cambridge University Heraldic Society; Cambridge University Society of Genealogists
- Established: 1957; 69 years ago
- President: Arlo Alexander
- Patron: Edward Fitzalan-Howard, 18th Duke of Norfolk
- Affiliations: University of Cambridge
- Website: cuhags.soc.srcf.net

The Cambridge University Heraldic and Genealogical Society was formed as the result of the merger in 1957 of a previous Heraldic Society (founded 1948) with the Cambridge University Society of Genealogists (founded 1954).

== About ==
The first Cambridge University Heraldic Society was founded in 1948 from the remnants of the late nineteenth-century Monumental Brass Society. In 1954, a separate Cambridge University Society of Genealogists was formed. Not surprisingly many members of one society were members of the other and on 10 June 1957, sponsored by some vice-presidents, by agreement between the secretaries, special general meetings of both societies were held and resolutions passed abolishing both societies on condition that a new joint society was formed later in the day. Meetings held earlier in the term had led to the formal culmination of a series of discussions for the consolidation and amalgamation.

The structure of the new society was to include a patron and a number of honorary vice-presidents. The committee was to consist of a president, a secretary, a senior treasurer, a junior treasurer and ordinary committee members.

Four speaker meetings are held in each of the Michaelmas and Lent terms and a ninth at the beginning of the Easter term. These are in the general area of heraldry and genealogy but also include cognate subjects such as ceremonial dress, tartan, local history, customs, military medals or indeed anything of an antiquarian nature. There are generally two outings each year—one in Michaelmas and one in Lent to places of heraldic and genealogical interest. In recent years, the society has visited the College of Arms, the Society of Genealogists and various cathedrals and museums. The society also hosts one large dinner each term with the Annual Dinner (in the Lent term) attracting up to 70 diners. In March 2023 this was held at the House of Lords. There is also a garden party in the Easter term.

In 2022 the society hosted the 35th International Congress of Genealogical and Heraldic Sciences patronised by the Earl of Wessex (now Duke of Edinburgh), and attended by officers of arms from many different nations (including Garter King of Arms, Lord Lyon King of Arms, York Herald, Rothesay Herald, and the Deputy Chief Herald of Canada).

=== Patrons ===
Sir Arthur Cochrane KCVO, former Clarenceux King of Arms, was Patron of the original Heraldic and Genealogical Societies until his death in 1954. The position was still vacant when the amalgamation took place. The Cambridge University Society of Genealogists had had a president in the person of Lord Mountbatten, a keen genealogist. Therefore, Lord Mountbatten was invited to be Patron of the new (1957) society, a post which he held until his assassination in 1979.

Lord Mountbatten was succeeded as Patron by Archbishop Bruno Heim, a leading authority on the heraldry of the Roman Catholic Church who designed armorial bearings for several Popes. Heim donated a copy of a number of his own publications to the society. After his death he was followed by the Duke of Norfolk, Earl Marshal and Hereditary Marshal of England.

Patrons of the society since 1957:

- Louis Mountbatten, 1st Earl Mountbatten of Burma, KG, GCB, OM, GCSI, GCIE, GCVO, DSO, KStJ, PC, 1957–1979.
- Archbishop Bruno Heim, GCStJ, 1980–2003.
- Edward Fitzalan-Howard, 18th Duke of Norfolk, GCVO, DL, 2003–present.

=== Presidents ===
The current and 62nd President is Arlo Alexander.

=== Current Honorary Vice Presidents ===
- Sir Henry Paston-Bedinfeld Bt, former Norroy and Ulster King of Arms
- Sir David White KCVO OStJ, former Garter Principal King of Arms, (President 1982–1983)
- Peter O'Donoghue OStJ, York Herald, (President 1993–1994)
- Derek Palgrave
- Dr Paul Fox (President 1984–1985)
- Richard van der Beek, (President 2016–2018)
- The Rev. Canon Joseph Morrow CVO CBE KStJ KC DL, Lord Lyon King of Arms

== Publications ==
In the late 1950s and early 1960s, the society transcribed the registers of the Cambridgeshire parishes of Shepreth and Westley Waterless and published a small number of copies. Its most ambitious project, however, was to produce The Cambridge Armorial showing the arms of all the corporate armigers in Cambridge (including town, university, colleges, theological colleges and schools) with blazons and brief histories of each. Although begun in 1966, it was to be nineteen years before it was published through the efforts of Wilfrid Scott-Giles, Heather Peak, Cecil Humphery-Smith and Dr Gordon H Wright. In 1995 the society launched a magazine, called the Escutcheon, which appears each term, edited by Derek Palgrave. It is now edited by Terence Trelawny-Gower.

== Notable past speakers and guests ==
The society is primarily a discussion group. Notable past speakers have included:

- Sir Colin Cole
- Michael Maclagan
- Sir Conrad Swan
- Wilfrid Scott-Giles
- John Brooke-Little
- Hubert Chesshyre
- Jonathan Riley-Smith
- Cecil Humphery-Smith
- Sir Peter Gwynn-Jones
- Rodney Dennys
- Bobby Milburn
- John George
- Sedley Andrus
- Patric Dickinson
- Sir Henry Paston-Bedingfeld
- Sir Thomas Woodcock
- Prince Tomislav of Yugoslavia
- Miles Fitzalan-Howard, 17th Duke of Norfolk
- Prince Michael of Kent
- Prince Edward, Duke of Edinburgh
- Sir Malcolm Innes of Edingight
- Timothy Duke
- Marjorie Chibnall
- Alastair Lorne Campbell of Airds
- Maurice Couve de Murville
- Peter O'Donoghue
- Alastair Bruce of Crionaich
- Sir John Baker
- Robert Shirley, 13th Earl Ferrers
- Robert Balchin, Baron Lingfield
- Clive Cheesman
- David Sellar
- Prince Ermias Sahle Selassie
- Prince Idris bin Abdullah al-Senussi
- Kristóf Szalay-Bobrovniczky
- Sophie Katsarava
- The Hon. Richard Cubitt
- Joseph Morrow
- Balthazar Napoleon IV de Bourbon
- Simon Isaacs, 4th Marquess of Reading
- The Hon. Philip Sidney
- Prince Juan de Bagration-Mukhrani
- Elizabeth Roads
- Kate Williams
- Bruce Patterson
- Mark Cubitt, 5th Baron Ashcombe
- Sir David White
- Princess Katarina of Yugoslavia
- Philip Mansel
- Mark Watson-Gandy
- Nikolai Tolstoy
- David Leakey
- Charles Beauclerk, 15th Duke of St Albans
- Rupert Carington, 7th Baron Carrington

== The Mountbatten Commemorative Lecture ==
Following the assassination of Lord Mountbatten, the society wished to honour its late Patron. With the permission of his elder daughter, Countess Mountbatten of Burma, the society inaugurated the Mountbatten Commemorative Lecture. This remains the most important meeting of the year and the lecture has frequently been given by senior members of the College of Arms which have included five successive Garter Kings of Arms (as well as two Lord Lyon Kings of Arms). In 1994, the society was greatly honoured when the Lecture was given by Prince Michael of Kent. The lecture for the year 1984–1985 was concerned with the genealogy of Lord Mountbatten himself and was delivered in the presence of Prince Edward who was at that time an undergraduate at Jesus College.

Year	Title	Lecturer
1981 (1st)	"The Work of the College of Arms"	Sedley Andrus, Lancaster Herald (later Beaumont Herald Extraordinary)
1982 (2nd)	"Arthurian Heraldry"	Michael Maclagan, Richmond Herald (also Slains Pursuivant of Arms)
1983 (3rd)	"J.H. Round"	D. Stephenson
1984 (4th)	"The Work and Records of the College of Arms"	John Brooke-Little, Clarenceux King of Arms
1985 (5th)	"The Genealogy of the Earl Mountbatten of Burma"	Cecil Humphery-Smith
1986 (6th)	"Garter Knights and Officers of the Order of the Garter"	Colin Cole, Garter Principal King of Arms
1987 (7th)	"European Armorials and Rolls—Some Thoughts and Comparisons"	C.J. Holyoake
1988 (8th)	"'Quinque saltus heraldici'—Five Heraldic Leaps"	Peter Gwynn-Jones, Garter King of Arms
1989 (9th)	"Some Thoughts on the Origins of Heralds"	John Brooke-Little, Clarenceux King of Arms
1990 (10th)	"The Work of the College of Arms"	Sedley Andrus, Lancaster Herald (later Beaumont Herald Extraordinary)
1991 (11th)	"The Baronies of East Anglia"	John Norton, Treasurer of Norfolk Heraldry Society
1992 (12th)	"Polish Heraldry"	Conrad Swan, Garter Principal King of Arms
1993 (13th)	"The Bastards …"	John Brooke-Little, Clarenceux King of Arms
1994 (14th)	"Lord Mountbatten"	Prince Michael of Kent
1995 (15th)		Conrad Swan, Garter Principal King of Arms
1996 (16th)	"Military Heraldry"	Col. I.S. Swinnerton, President of the Federation of Family History Societies
1997 (17th)	"Nelson's Heraldry"	David White, Garter Principal King of Arms
1998 (18th)	"The Most Noble Order of the Garter"	Hubert Chesshyre, Clarenceux King of Arms
1999 (19th)	"Back to the Future: European Heraldry after Communism"	Toby Wilkinson, University of Durham
2000 (20th)	"Earl Mountbatten and Genealogy"	Cecil Humphery-Smith
2001 (21st)	"Aspects of High State Heraldry"	John Brooke-Little, Clarenceux King of Arms
2002 (22nd)	"Montgomery Heraldry"	E. Hugh Montgomery
2003 (23rd)	"State Funeral of Sir Winston Churchill"	Jack Darrah
2004 (24th)	"Early New Zealand Grants of Arms"	David White, Garter Principal King of Arms
2005 (25th)	"The Society of Genealogists Library"	Susan Gibbons
2006 (26th)	"Music in Heraldry"	Henry Paston-Bedingfeld, Norroy and Ulster King of Arms
2007 (27th)	"The College of Arms in the Eighteenth Century"	Peter O'Donoghue, York Herald
2008 (28th)	"The Court of Chivalry in Stuart Heraldry"	Vittoria Feola, Université libre de Bruxelles
2009 (29th)	"'Les Grandes d'Espagne ne danseront pas': Dukes, ducal lookalikes and the dilemmata of rank in Ancien Régime France"	Leonhard Horowski
2010 (30th)	"The Role of the Lord Lyon"	David Sellar, Lord Lyon King of Arms
2011 (31st)	"Heraldry of York Minster"	Dr Paul A. Fox
2012 (32nd)		Thomas Woodcock, Garter Principal King of Arms
2013 (33rd)	"Heraldry and Ceremonial in the Holy Roman Empire"	B.J.G.A. Kress, Warburg Institute
2014 (34th)	"The College of Arms in the Second World War"	Peter O'Donoghue, York Herald
2015 (35th)	"Norroy's Reminiscences"	Henry Paston-Bedingfeld, Norroy and Ulster King of Arms
2016 (36th)	"Out of the Blue: Oxford Academic Dress in the Twentieth Century"	A.J.P. North
2017 (37th)	"The Heraldry of Eton College"	David Broomfield
2018 (38th)	"The Monarchical Republic of Oliver Cromwell"	David Smith
2019 (39th)	"The Graces of Cambridge Colleges and Related Dining Customs"	Julian Cable
2020 (40th)	"The Genealogy of Monsignor Alfred Newman Gilbey"	Ronald Creighton-Jobe
2021 (41st)	"The Court of the Lord Lyon"	Joseph Morrow, Lord Lyon King of Arms
2022 (42nd)	"The Heraldry and History of Georgia"	Prince Juan de Bagration-Mukhrani
2023 (43rd)	"Uncle Dickie"	Princess Katarina of Yugoslavia
2024 (44th)	"The House of Schleswig-Holstein-Sonderburg-Glucksburg"	Edward Hilary Davis (President 2021–2023)
2025 (45th)	"The Monarchical Republic of Oliver Cromwell"	Dr David Smith
2026 (46th)	"History of the Lord Great Chamberlains of England and the 2023 Coronation"	Rupert Carington, 7th Baron Carrington Lord Great Chamberlain

== Coat of arms ==
Coat of arms of Cambridge University Heraldic and Genealogical Society
Granted 30th May 2007 (College of Arms, London) Crest Upon a Helm with a Wreath Or and Sable A demi-Lion guardant Or supporting with its sinister foot a Book fesswise Argent bound Gules clasped Or and holding in its dexter foot a Crane’s Leg a la quise Gules feathered Or Escutcheon Or a Cross Pean between four Lions' Faces Gules and conjoined to a Bordure Pean

The only other student society that has a Coat of Arms is the Diagnostic Society of Edinburgh
