= Division of the field =

Section of the field on an escutcheon

In heraldry, the field (background) of a shield can be divided into more than one area, or subdivision, of different tinctures, usually following the lines of one of the ordinaries and carrying its name (e.g. a shield divided in the shape of a chevron is said to be parted "per chevron"). Shields may be divided this way for differencing (to avoid conflict with otherwise similar coats of arms) or for purposes of marshalling (combining two or more coats of arms into one), or simply for style. The lines that divide a shield may not always be straight, and there is a system of terminology for describing patterned lines, which is also shared with the heraldic ordinaries.

French heraldry takes a different approach in many cases from the one described in this article.

== Common divisions of the field ==
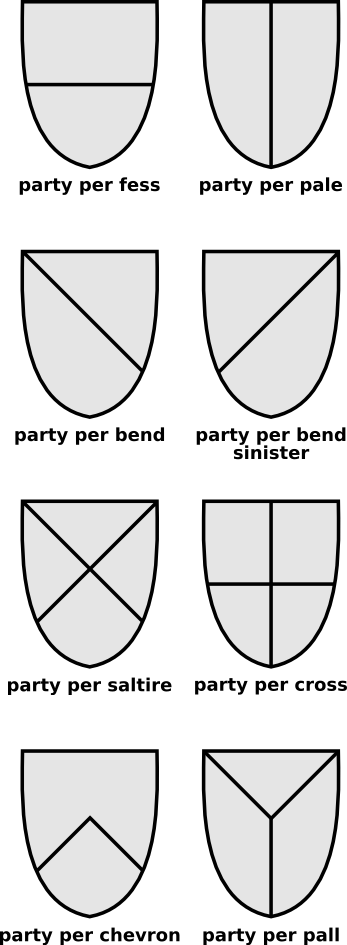
Division of the field

Common partitions of the field are:

- parted (or party) per fess (halved horizontally)
- party per pale (halved vertically)
- party per bend (diagonally from viewer’s upper left to lower right)
- party per bend sinister (diagonally from viewer’s upper right to lower left)
- party per saltire (diagonally both ways)
- party per cross or quarterly (divided into four quarters)
- party per chevron (after the manner of a chevron)
- party per pall (divided into three parts in a Y shape)

(In the above "left" and "right" are from the viewer's perspective, whereas the heraldic terms "sinister" and "dexter" are from the perspective of the person carrying the shield.) Nowadays, however, the 'party' is often omitted, even in 'official' blazons, e.g. in letters patent and extracts of matriculation.

A field cannot be divided per bordure (as, if this did exist, it would be indistinguishable from the bordure), but a bordure can be divided or counter-changed.

Neither can a field (nor any charge) be divided per chief, for similar reasons; though both Canadian and Scottish Public Registers have official records of fields or bordures divided 'per chief'. The earliest such record in the Scottish Public Register is before 1677, "parted per chief azure and gules three skenes argent hefted and pomelled Or Surmounted of as many Woolf-heads couped of the third." and a bordure per chief is shown in the arms of Roy, Canada. A chief is considered a charge in English heraldry and is considered layered atop the field.

Papal coat of arms of Benedict XVI is Gules chapé ployé Or or "tierced in mantle"

Shields may also be divided into three parts: this is called tierced, as in tierced per pale, azure, argent and gules (though perhaps in English heraldry this is rarely if ever done, and the foregoing shield would be blazoned — as the pale is supposed to be one-third of the width of the field and is always so depicted under these circumstances — per pale azure and gules, a pale argent. but Scottish heraldry does use 'tierced in pale' (e.g. Clackmannan county (now Clackmannanshire) has Or; a saltire gules; a chief tierced in pale vert, argent, vert ...) A particular type of tiercing, resembling a Y in shape (division lines per bend and bend sinister coming down from the chief, meeting at the fess point, and continuing down per pale), is called per pall (also per pairle). The arms of Pope Benedict XVI is "tierced in mantle" – as described in Vatican information pages, but the usual term in, for example South African heraldry, is chapé ployé (with arched lines, with straight lines: chapé (mantled)), which may be blazoned with three tinctures or just two – e.g. Okakarara Technical Institute: Gules, chapé Azure, on the partition lines respectively a bend and a bend sinister enhanced, in base a demi-cogwheel, Or, with a fountain issuant. Shields may also be divided into three parts by a combination of two methods of division, such as party per fess, in chief per pale. Another example is in the arms of Clive Cheesman: per pale and per pall. This is to be distinguished from the essentially unique partition in the arms of the 2nd Weather Group of the United States Air Force, which is Dexter per chevron ployé and sinister per fess enhanced.

=== Chaussé ===
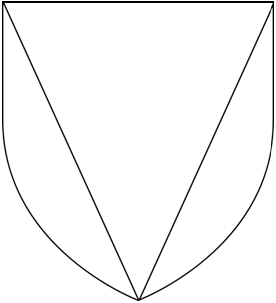
Chaussé

A shield may also be party per chevron reversed (inverted), which is like party per chevron except upside down. A section formed by two (straight) lines drawn from the corners of the chief to the point in base is called chaussé (shod), which must be distinguished from the pile, the point of which does not reach the bottom of the shield. With arched or bent (French: ployé) lines it is called chaussé ployé.

== Marshalling ==
The dimidiated arms of Sieradz County in Poland

One common reason for dividing the field in heraldry is for purposes of combining two or more coats of arms to express alliance, inheritance, occupation of an office, etc. This practice, called marshalling, initially took the form of dimidiation, or splicing together two coats of arms split down the middle (or sometimes, though rarely, split across the centre per fess or quarterly) so that half one coat was matched up with the opposite half of the other. As this would sometimes yield confusing or misleading results, the practice was supplanted by impalement, which kept both coats intact and simply squished them into half the space. According to Fox-Davies (1909), the practice of dimidiation was short-lived and had already reached its peak in the early 14th century, while impalement remains in practice to modern times. One important remainder of the practice, however, is that when a coat of arms with a bordure is impaled with another coat, the bordure does not continue down the centre, but stops short where it meets the line of impalement. Eventually quartering gained usage, and in the height of its popularity during the Victorian era, some coats of arms featured hundreds of "quarterings" (see the Grenville arms at right). More usually, however, a quartered coat of arms consisted of four parts, as the name suggests. The origin and underlying purpose of quartering is to express inheritance by female succession: when a female heir (who has no brothers, or whose brothers have all preceded her in death) dies, her son (only after her death) quarters her arms with those of his father, placing the father's arms in the first (upper left) and fourth (lower right) quarters and his mother's arms in the second (upper right) and third (lower left).

The arms of Richard, 2nd Duke of Buckingham and Chandos, claimed 719 quarterings

In the UK heraldries, complex systems of marshalling have developed, and continue to thrive, around heraldic expressions of inheritance. In many cases of marriage, the shield is impaled with the husband's entire coat of arms placed on the dexter side and the wife's entire coat placed on the sinister side; if the wife is an heiress, however, her arms are placed in escutcheon over her husband's (such usage is almost entirely English, Scots marshalling being impaling like any other marriage arms). If the husband is a knight of any order, however, the ensigns of that order belong only to him and are not shared with his wife. Two separate shields are then employed, the dexter shield bearing the husband's arms within the circle of his knighthood, and the sinister shield bearing the husband's arms impaled with the wife's usually encircled with a meaningless wreath of oak leaves for artistic balance. A male peer impales the arms of his wife as described above, but including the supporters, coronet and helmet of the peer; if he is also a knight of any order, the two-shield method is used. If a female peer marries a commoner, however, the husband places her arms inescutcheon, surmounted by a coronet of her rank, over his own, but the supporters of her rank cannot be conferred to him; the wife bears her arms singly on a lozenge with the supporters and coronet of her rank. Volumes may be written on all the endless heraldic possibilities of this convoluted system of marshalling, but it may suffice here to say that for various purposes, arms may be marshalled by four basic methods: dimidiation by clipping and splicing two coats (usually per pale), impalement by dividing per pale and crowding an entire coat of arms into each half, quartering by dividing the shield into usually four (but potentially innumerable) "quarters", and superimposition by placing one coat of arms inescutcheon over another. It is also worth noting that one common form in German-Nordic heraldry is "quarterly with a heart" (a shield quartered with an inescutcheon overall). This may have stemmed from the continental practice of sovereigns placing their own hereditary arms inescutcheon over the arms of their dominions.

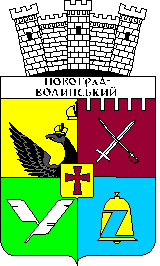
Coat of arms of Zviahel

The arms of Zviahel, Ukraine, show an unusual form of marshalling quarterly with a heart, where one quarter is dimidiated while the others are not.

Example of two coats of arms dimidiated

The same two coats impaled

Example of the quartering of two coats of arms

Example of incorporating arms as an escutcheon

== Lines of division ==
Municipal arms of Ylämaa, Finland: Vert, a chief fir twigged argent.

Municipal arms of Mullsjö, Sweden: Azure, a snow crystal argent a chief fir tree topped also argent

Divisions of the field, like the ordinaries, may follow complex line shapes. Most of these "sections" have developed conventional names in English, but modern artists, particularly in Finland, have developed new sections influenced by shapes found in the local flora. Among the most common of these are engrailed, invected, indented, dancetty, wavy (also called undy), nebuly, embattled, raguly, dovetailed and potenty (pictured below). Notable modern forms include the "fir twig section" (Finnish: havukoro) and "fir tree top section" (Finnish: kuusikoro). These can be found in the arms of a number of municipalities in Finland, and the latter can also be found in the arms of Mullsjö Municipality in Sweden.

Engrailed	Invected	Indented	Dancetty
Wavy (or Undy)	Nebuly	Embattled	Raguly
Dovetailed	Potenty		

== Other modifications ==
The arms of Eric of Pomerania as king of the Kalmar Union are quartered by a cross gules ...

Besides the complex lines discussed above, divisions of the field may also be modified in other ways. Sometimes the division of the field may be fimbriated (lined) or, perhaps less properly, "edged" of another tincture, or divided by some ordinary or its diminutive. The latter differs from a parted field that then bears the ordinary, in that if the ordinary thus dividing the field is between charges, the charges are not overlapped by the ordinary but the ordinary is between them. A famous example of this is the greater arms of Sweden, which is "quartered by a cross Or..."

One division of the field (though it is sometimes described as a charge) is restricted to the chief: when the chief is divided by a bow-shaped line, this is called a chapournet or chaperonnet ("little hood"). Rompu, meaning "broken", is often applied to a chevron, where the center is usually broken and enhanced (brought to a sharper point than normal).

== Unusual forms ==
- When the partition lines form four L-shapes, the field is blazoned quarterly en equerre (viz. "framing square", German: Winkelmaßschnitt).
- A number of divisions are unique to German heraldry, including per bend... broken in the form of a linden leaf.
- The arms of the former Republic of Bophuthatswana were "per fess (at nombril point)" (lower than the regular per fess division; the "nombril point" is halfway between the fess point — the exact middle of the field — and the base point, at the bottom centre of the field).
- The arms of the French department of Côtes-d'Armor show émanché, which is shown in this case as equivalent to the English per fess dancetty of two full points upwards.
- The arms of Mpumalanga Province in South Africa show per bend sinister, inclined in the flanks per fess.

== See also ==
- Variation of the field
