= Peter O'Donoghue (officer of arms) =

British officer of arms

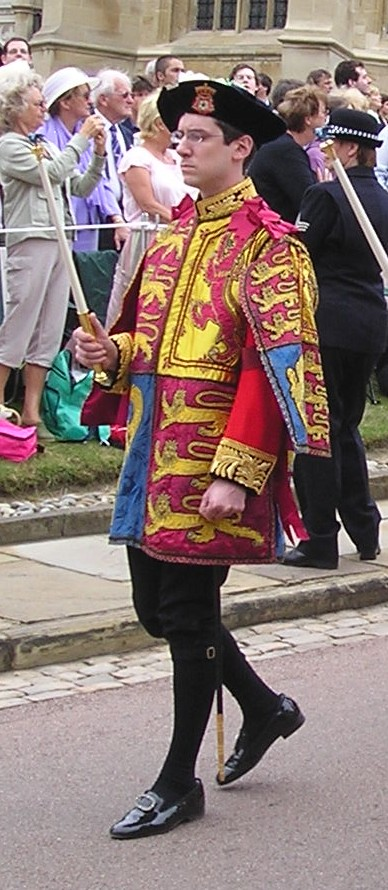
O'Donoghue, when Bluemantle, at the 2006 Garter Service

Michael Peter Desmond O'Donoghue MStJ FSA (born 1971), is a member of the British Royal Household serving as an officer at the College of Arms in London.

O'Donoghue succeeded Sir Henry Paston-Bedingfeld, Norroy & Ulster King of Arms, being promoted on 31 May 2012 as York Herald, having previously served as Bluemantle Pursuivant from 2005.

== Life and career ==
He is the only son of Michael John O'Donoghue FGS (1934–2016), an author and lecturer in gemmology at London Metropolitan University, formerly a curator at the British Museum and the National Library of Scotland and Elizabeth Anne Hawkins (née Borley).

After attending Dulwich College, O'Donoghue went up to read English at Gonville and Caius College, Cambridge (M.A. 1994), being elected President of the Cambridge University Heraldic & Genealogical Society.

After Cambridge, for several years O'Donoghue was a genealogist and researcher, including serving as research assistant to two Windsor Heralds – the late Theo Mathew and Major William Hunt.

O'Donoghue co-edited (with Dr Clive Cheesman now Norroy & Ulster King of Arms) The Coat of Arms, the journal of the Heraldry Society, from 2005 when both heralds succeeded John Brooke-Little, late Clarenceux King of Arms in its editorship.

O'Donoghue served as Librarian of the College of Arms from 2010 until 2021 when he became its Registrar. He became a Liveryman of the Armourers and Brasiers’ Company in 2010, having been admitted to the Freedom of the City of London in 2005.

Elected a Fellow of the Society of Antiquaries in 2015, a Fellow of the Heraldry Society in 2021, a Member of the Committee on Heraldry of the New England Historic Genealogical Society in 2022, an Associate of the Académie internationale d'Héraldique in 2023, O'Donoghue is also an Honorary Fellow of Dundee University.

Appointed a Member of the Most Venerable Order of St John in 2024, O'Donoghue succeeded as Genealogist of the Order of St John in April 2025 from David White, Garter King of Arms, in addition to serving as Honorary Genealogist to the Order of St Michael and St George since 2024.

In 2002, O'Donoghue married Dr Catherine Ann Wolfe.

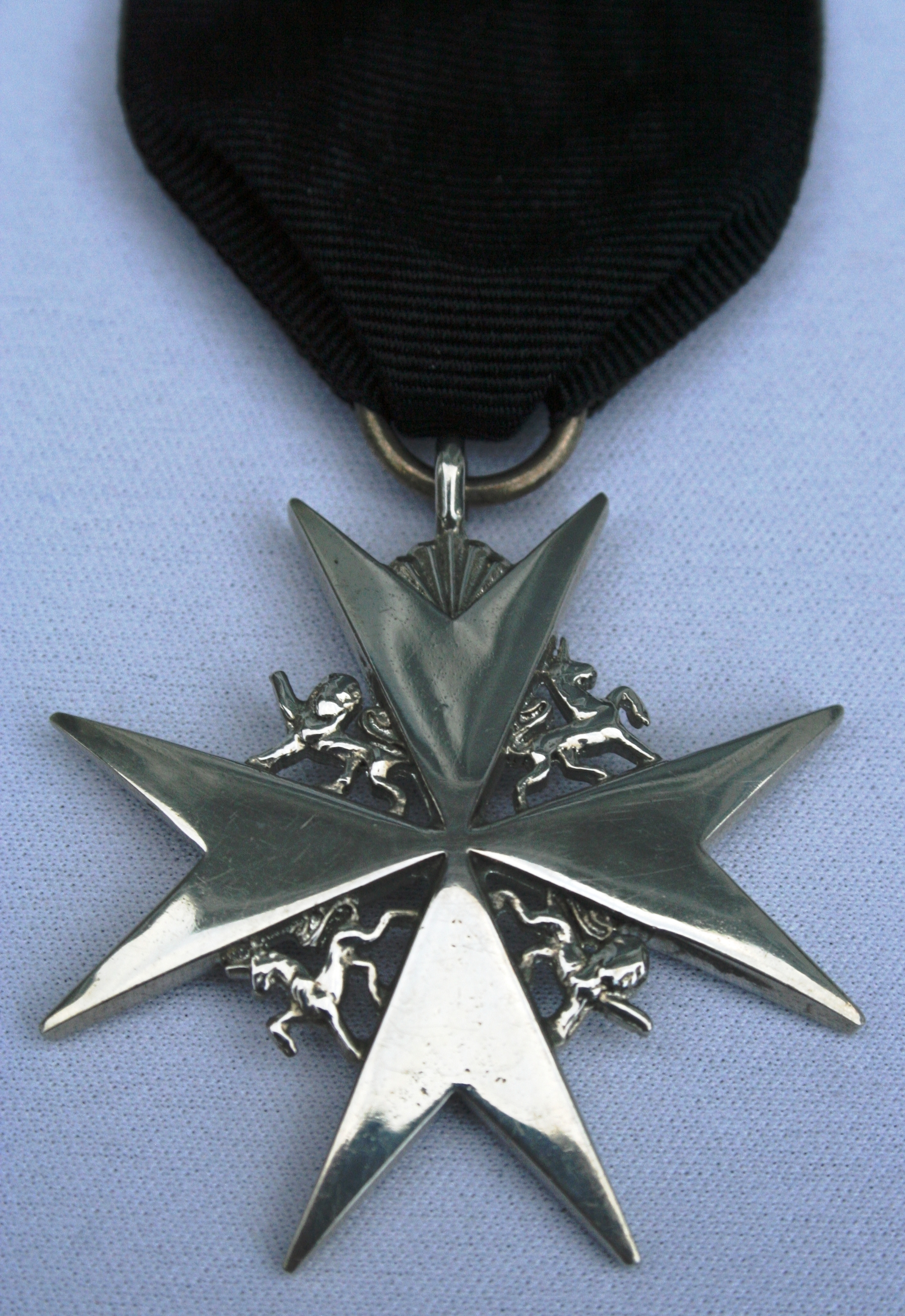
MStJ insignia

== Honours and awards ==
- 2024: Member of the Most Venerable Order of St John of Jerusalem (MStJ)
- 2012: Queen Elizabeth II Diamond Jubilee Medal
- 2022: Queen Elizabeth II Platinum Jubilee Medal
- 2023: King Charles III Coronation Medal
- 2015: FSA
- 2021: FHS

== See also ==
- Heraldry
- College of Arms

Heraldic offices
Preceded by Robert Noel	Bluemantle Pursuivant; 2005 – 2012	Succeeded by Mark Scott
Preceded by Sir Henry Paston-Bedingfeld	York Herald; 2012 – present	Incumbent
Preceded by David White	Registrar of the College of Arms; 2021 – present	Incumbent
