= James Peill =

English herald (born 1971)

James van Someren Peill FSA
- Born: 1971 (age 54–55); Herefordshire, England
- Education: University of Edinburgh (MA)
- Occupations: Author and Officer of Arms
- Spouse: Saskia Lawson-Johnston
- Website: www.college-of-arms.gov.uk

James van Someren Peill FSA (born 1971) is a British author and historian, who since 2024 serves at the College of Arms in London as an officer of arms and member of the Royal Household. Since July 2026, he has served as Garter Principal King of Arms.

== Biography ==
=== Early life ===
Peill read History of Art at the University of Edinburgh, graduating MA in 1994.

=== Career ===
Peill joined Christie's as a graduate trainee specialising in furniture and worked as an auctioneer in London and New York. In 2009, he was recruited by the 10th Duke of Richmond, Lennox and Gordon as curator of the Goodwood Collection.

He was elected a Fellow of the Society of Antiquaries of London (FSA) in 2016.

Peill is the author of Glorious Goodwood: A Biography of England’s Greatest Sporting Estate (Constable & Little, Brown, 2019) and The English Country House (Vendome, 2013), as well as co-authoring, with fellow antiquarian Desmond FitzGerald, Irish Furniture (Yale, 2007) and The Irish Country House (Vendome, 2010).

Joining the College of Arms as a probationary officer in 2022, Peill was appointed in 2024 as Bluemantle Pursuivant in succession to Mark Scott. He was appointed Richmond Herald on 28 May 2026, but transferred to Garter King of Arms on 1 July 2026.

== Family ==
In 2008, Peill married Saskia Lawson Johnston (born 1985), an artist and only daughter of the Hon. Philip Lawson Johnston, and granddaughter of Ian Lawson Johnston, 2nd Baron Luke KCVO. They have four daughters.

== Armorial achievement ==
Coat of arms of James van Someren Peill
Escutcheon Quarterly per fess embattled Or and Vert in the first and fourth quarters a garb of the second and in the second quarter a thistle and in the third quarter a sun in splendour of the first

Heraldic offices
Preceded by Mark Scott	Bluemantle Pursuivant; 2024 – 2026	Succeeded by James Broun
Preceded by Clive Cheesman	Richmond Herald; 26 May 2026 – 30 June 2026	Succeeded by Vacant
Preceded by Sir David White	Garter King of Arms; 1 July 2026 – present	Incumbent
