= Hubert Chesshyre =

British officer of arms (1940–2020)

Hubert Chesshyre FSA FHS
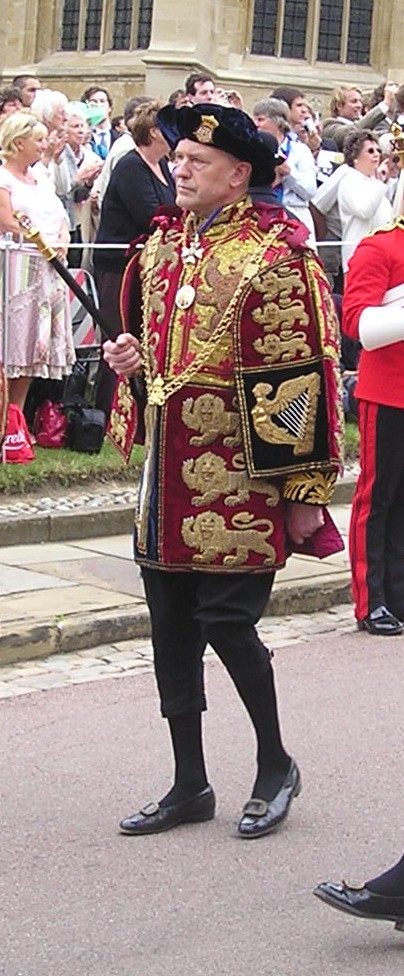
- Chesshyre taking part in the Garter Day procession at Windsor Castle on 19 June 2006.

Clarenceux King of Arms
- In office 1997–2010
- Preceded by: John Brooke-Little
- Succeeded by: Patric Dickinson

Personal details
- Born: David Hubert Boothby Chesshyre; 22 June 1940
- Died: 24 December 2020 (aged 80)
- Education: The King's School, Canterbury
- Alma mater: Trinity College, Cambridge; Christ Church, Oxford
- Occupation: Officer of Arms
- Awards: Lieutenant of the Royal Victorian Order 1988–2003; Commander of the Royal Victorian Order 2003–2018
- Criminal information
- Status: Allegations proven in a trial of the facts
- Criminal charge: Non-recent child sexual abuse
- Penalty: Absolute discharge

David Hubert Boothby Chesshyre FSA FHS (22 June 1940 – 24 December 2020) was a British officer of arms.

Chesshyre served for more than forty years as an officer of arms in ordinary to Queen Elizabeth II and as a member of Her Majesty's Household. He was Clarenceux King of Arms, the second most senior member of the College of Arms and the second most senior heraldic position in England, Wales, Northern Ireland, Australia, New Zealand, and several other Commonwealth countries. His other appointments included those of Registrar of the College of Arms, Secretary of the Order of the Garter, and Honorary Genealogist to the Royal Victorian Order. Chesshyre undertook heraldic and genealogical work for high-profile clients such as the former prime minister Sir Edward Heath. He wrote seven books, including the official history of the Order of the Garter.

In October 2015, a jury sitting at Snaresbrook Crown Court found by a unanimous verdict that Chesshyre had committed child sexual abuse offences in the 1990s. He was found to be unfit to plead, and his trial was therefore a trial of the facts. This means that no formal conviction is recorded and Chesshyre was therefore given an absolute discharge.

== Early life and family ==
David Hubert Boothby Chesshyre was born on 22 June 1940, the son of Captain (later Colonel) Hubert Layard Chesshyre (d. 1981), an officer in the Royal Engineers, and his wife Katharine Anne (d. 1995), daughter of Major Basil Tanfield Beridge Boothby. Hubert had adopted the surname Chesshyre in 1938, renouncing his previous surname Isacke; he was the son of Major-General Hubert Isacke and maternal grandson of Sir Charles Layard, the Chief Justice of Ceylon. Among Chesshyre's other ancestors were the Earls of Dundee and Lauderdale, the Boothby baronets and the lawyer Sir John Chesshyre.

== Education and early career ==
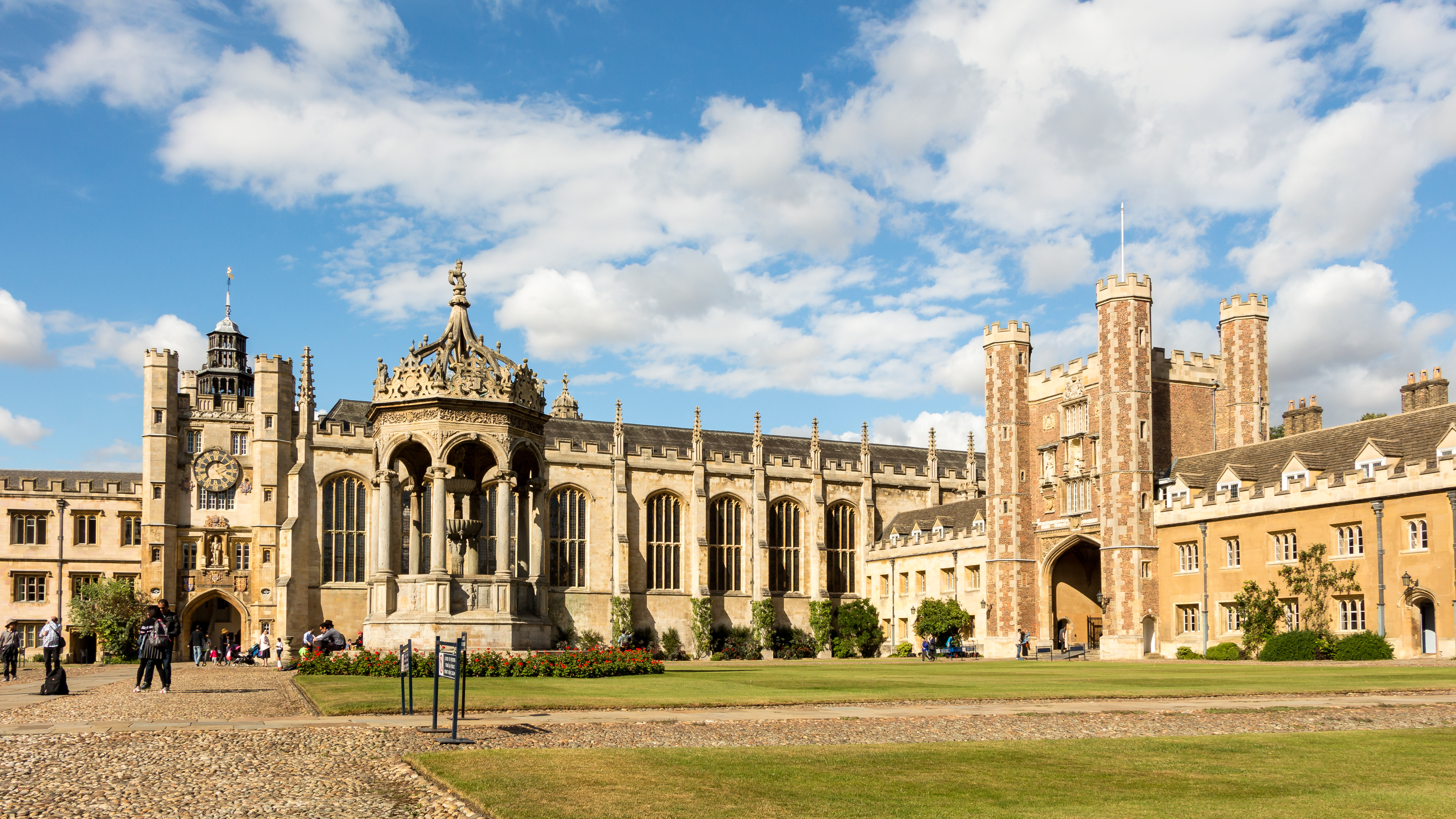
The Great Court at Trinity College, Cambridge, where Chesshyre studied. Its chapel is behind the covered fountain.

Chesshyre was educated at St Michael's Preparatory School, Otford, where he was a contemporary of John Hurt. He went on to The King's School, Canterbury (1954–59).

Chesshyre studied at Trinity College, Cambridge, graduating with a Bachelor of Arts degree in 1962, and proceeding by convention to Master of Arts in 1966. After graduating from Cambridge Chesshyre worked for Moët et Chandon and John Harvey & Sons between 1962 and 1965. He then studied at Christ Church, Oxford, where he was awarded a Diploma in Education in 1967.

Chesshyre very briefly served in the Honourable Artillery Company from 1964 until 1965.

== Heraldic career ==
=== College of Arms ===
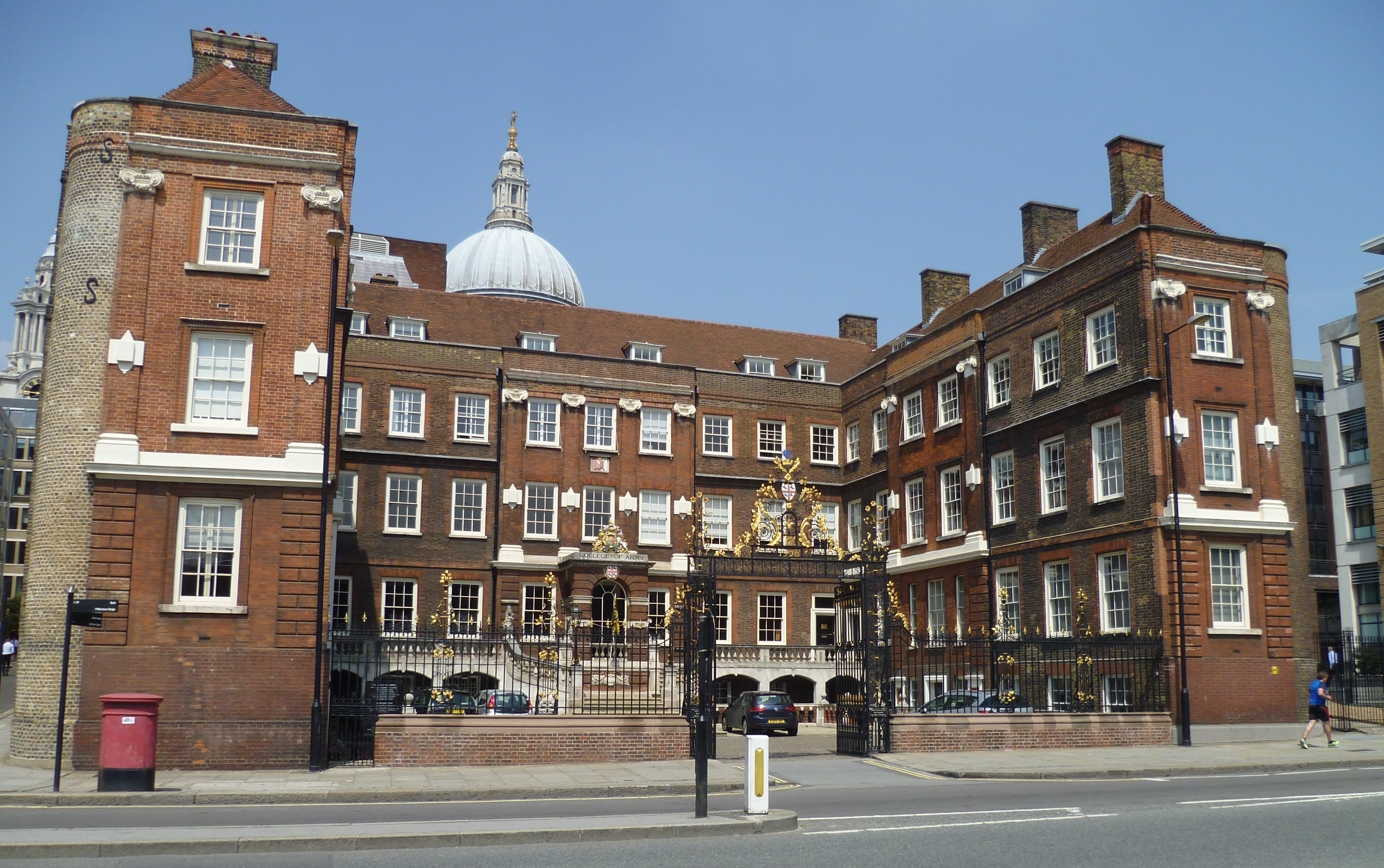
Chesshyre worked at the College of Arms in the City of London from 1967 until 2010

Having received his Diploma in Education from Oxford, Chesshyre did not enter the teaching profession, but instead was appointed in 1967 to a position as an assistant at the College of Arms. He was a Green Staff Officer at the Investiture of the Prince of Wales in 1969. Appointed a member of the Chapter of the College of Arms the following year, he served as Rouge Croix Pursuivant (1970–78), Chester Herald (1978–95), Norroy and Ulster King of Arms and Principal Herald of the North part of England and of Northern Ireland (1995–97), and Clarenceux King of Arms and Principal Herald for the South, East and West parts of England (1997–2010). From 1971 until 1978 he also served on the staff of Anthony Wagner. He was Registrar of the College of Arms from 1992 until 2000 and was the Founder Secretary of the College of Arms Uniform Fund in 1980, serving in that capacity until 1999. From early in his career Chesshyre from time to time served as a deputy to Garter Principal King of Arms for the purpose of introducing peers into the House of Lords. For example, in 1975 he introduced Baroness Vickers.

As a herald, Chesshyre designed the coats of arms of a number of notable people, including the former Prime Minister Sir Edward Heath, two Speakers of the House of Commons (Baroness Boothroyd and John Bercow), the Archbishop of York David Hope, the businessman Lord Sugar, the musician Sir Paul McCartney, the author Sir Terry Pratchett and the actor Sir John Hurt.

Chesshyre was Secretary of the Order of the Garter from 1988 until 2003, having been trained for the role by his predecessor Walter Verco and by Verco's predecessor-but-one, Anthony Wagner. Upon his resignation Chesshyre had an audience with Queen Elizabeth II at Buckingham Palace, during which he surrendered his badge of office. Following the 1992 Windsor Castle fire Chesshyre was, together with Peter Begent, appointed heraldic consultant for the reconstruction of St George's Hall. Chesshyre was also Honorary Genealogist of The Society of the Friends of St George's and Descendants of the Knights of the Garter. He also served for twenty-three years as Honorary Genealogist to the Royal Victorian Order (1987–2010), again, succeeding Walter Verco. As Ulster King of Arms (merged with Norroy) Chesshyre also held the technically extant position of King of Arms, Registrar, and Knight Attendant of the Order of St Patrick. He was therefore briefly one of just two members of the Order of St Patrick, the other member being Queen Elizabeth II, who remained Sovereign of the Order.

Chesshyre retired from the College of Arms on 31 August 2010. His last public duties took place at the State Opening of Parliament on 25 May 2010 and at the Garter Day ceremony on 14 June 2010. Commentating on the State Opening for the BBC, Huw Edwards remarked upon Chesshyre's forty years of service.

=== Other work ===
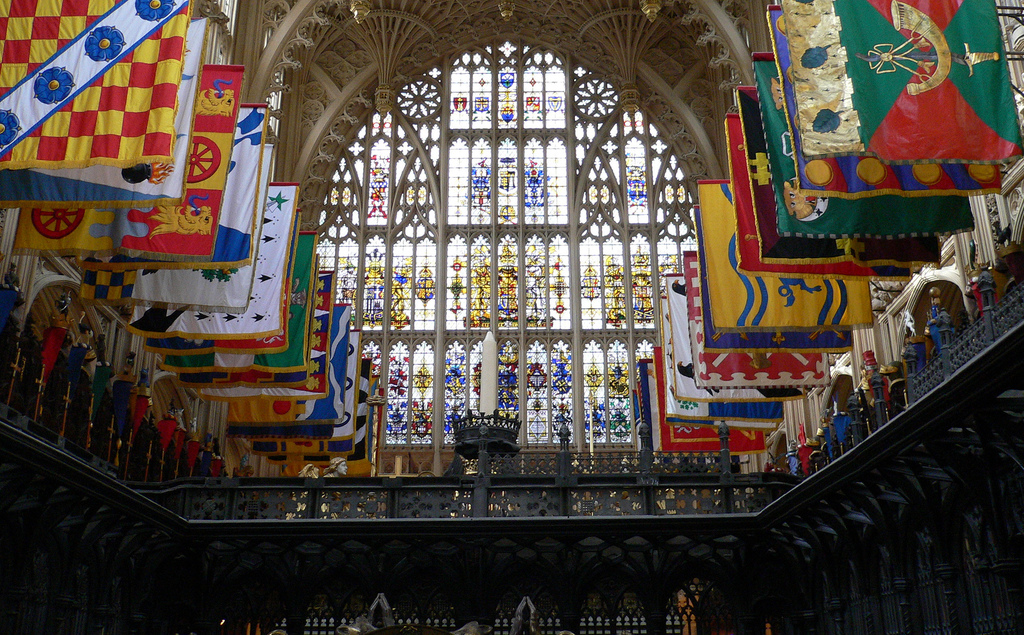
Chesshyre advised on the design for this heraldic window in the Henry VII Lady Chapel, Westminster Abbey.

In 1973, Chesshyre completed a report into the missing collar on the tomb of Elizabeth I in Westminster Abbey. He was a member of the Abbey's Architectural Advisory Panel from 1985 until 1998, and then of its Fabric Commission from 1998 until 2003. He was also heraldic advisor for the west window of the Henry VII Lady Chapel, donated by John Templeton and devised by Donald Buttress, which Elizabeth II unveiled in 1995.

Chesshyre served as heraldic advisor to the committee that organised the re-enactment of the funeral of Arthur, Prince of Wales in Worcester on 3 May 2002. On the day of the re-enactment, Chesshyre processed through the streets of Worcester bearing Arthur's crested helm, followed by other heralds bearing his sword, tabard, gauntlets, and spurs.

Chesshyre worked as a freelance lecturer in the United Kingdom and abroad. For many years he lectured for the National Association of Decorative and Fine Arts Societies and Speaker Finders.

Chesshyre has been credited with establishing the probable origins of the common error of using the term crest to refer to the whole achievement. He explains that in the 18th century it was common for smaller items, such as spoons and forks, to be engraved with the crest alone, while the full achievement was reserved for larger items such as salvers. For this reason a number of publications appeared from the late 18th century through to the early 20th century which recorded only crests. Chesshyre later successfully lobbied the chief revise editor of The Times to include an explanation of the precise meaning of the term crest in a new edition of the newspaper's staff manual.

Chesshyre was a choral clerk of Trinity College, Cambridge during his time as an undergraduate at the college. From 1979 until 1993 Chesshyre was a member of The Bach Choir. Chesshyre sang for the London Docklands Singers, which he joined in 2002. He was, from 1980, a member of the Madrigal Society, the oldest musical society in Europe (see Madrigal). He became a Freeman of the Worshipful Company of Musicians in 1994 and a Liveryman of the Company in 1995.

== Scholarly publications ==
The Most Noble Order of the Garter, which Chesshyre co-authored with Peter Begent and Lisa Jefferson, included a foreword by Prince Philip, Duke of Edinburgh. One of the book's reviewers, John Goodall, wrote that it was the "most comprehensive" study of the subject since that of Elias Ashmole, and "unlikely to be superseded". Another reviewer, Maurice Keen, wrote that it was "invaluable to scholars whose interests touch on the history of the order, from the widest variety of points of view and period specialisation", and that "Altogether, Peter Begent and Hubert Chesshyre have put together a volume that for its thoroughness, its interest and its physical attraction is a worthy tribute to the longevity of England's highest order of chivalry."

M. K. Ridgway, reviewing The Identification of Coats of Arms on British Silver, wrote that Chesshyre "has the undoubted gift of making a difficult and complicated subject both exciting and interesting".

In the early 1970s Chesshyre met the architect Thomas Saunders when Chesshyre and one of his brothers unsuccessfully competed with Saunders to bid for a property in Bethnal Green, 17 Old Ford Road. Four years after he had purchased the property, Saunders contacted Chesshyre with a commission to write a history of Bethnal Green, with particular reference to the legend of the Blind Beggar. This resulted in The Green, co-authored with A. J. Robinson, which was later described by Victor E. Neuburg as "The best—indeed only—comprehensive account of the subject".

== Honours ==
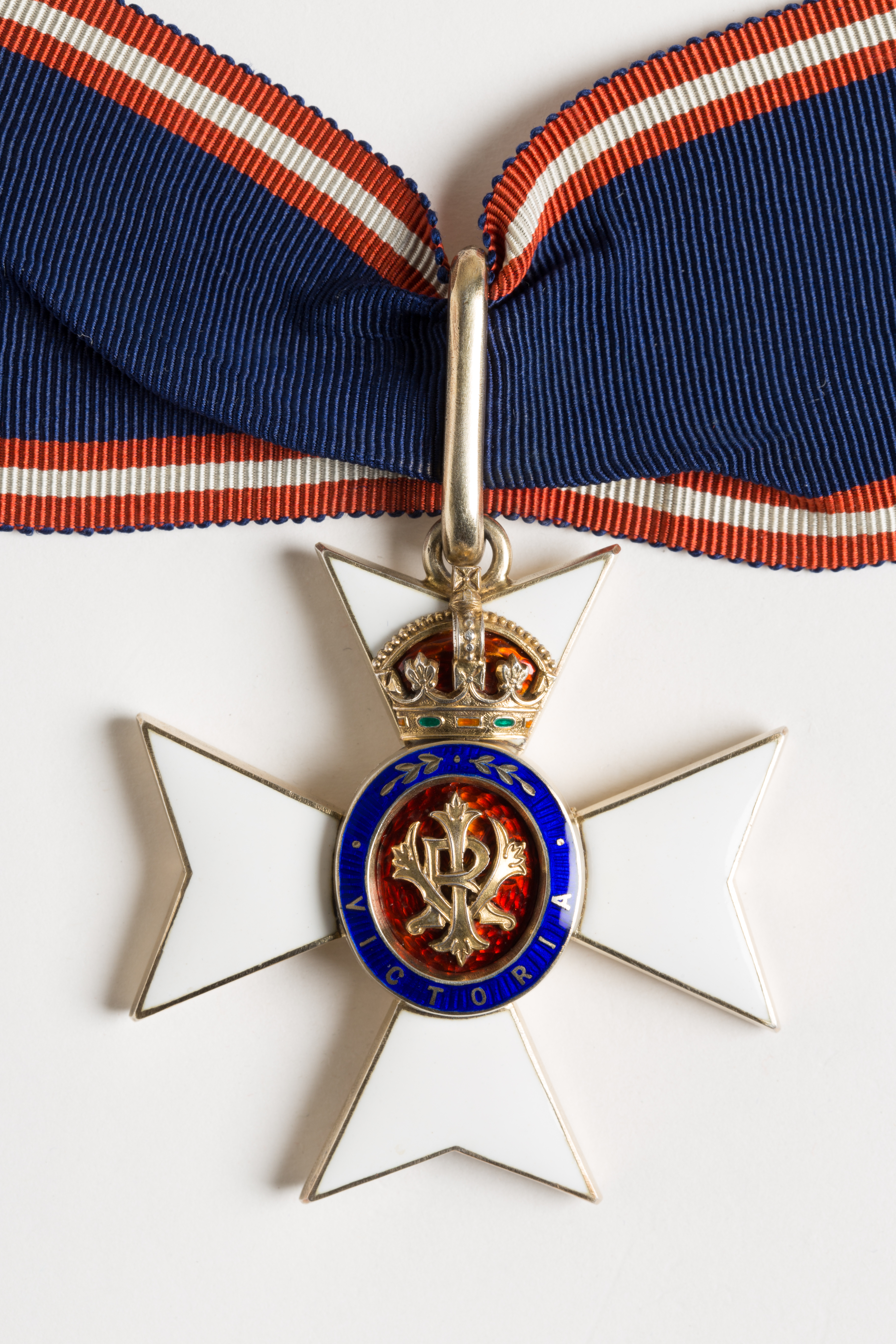
The neck badge of a Commander of the Royal Victorian Order. Chesshyre held this honour from 2003 until 2018.

Chesshyre was appointed a Lieutenant of the Royal Victorian Order (LVO) in the 1988 Birthday Honours and was promoted to be a Commander of the Order (CVO) in the 2004 New Year Honours. Chesshyre's appointment to be a Commander of the Royal Victorian Order was cancelled and annulled with effect from Tuesday 15 May 2018.

Chesshyre became a Freeman of the City of London in 1975. He was elected a fellow of the Society of Antiquaries of London in 1977 and was a member of its heraldry committee, known as the Croft Lyons Committee. Since 1983 he has been a member of the Cocked Hat Club, the senior dining club of the Society of Antiquaries, serving as praeses (president) in 1986. Chesshyre was also a member of the Council of the Heraldry Society from 1973 until 1985, and he was elected a fellow of the Society in 1990. He was vice-president of the Institute of Heraldic and Genealogical Studies (IHGS) and was a Director of the IHGS until 31 December 1993. However, after his sexual offences and the forfeiture of his main honour came to light, The Observer reported that the "trustees promptly removed him as vice-president". Chesshyre has been honoured with the titles of associate member of the Society of Heraldic Arts and honorary member of the White Lion Society. He was also the patron of the now defunct Middlesex Heraldry Society.

In 1998 the Cambridge University Heraldic and Genealogical Society appointed Chesshyre to deliver its annual Mountbatten Memorial Lecture. Two years later, Chesshyre was a guest of honour at the CUHAGS Fiftieth Annual Dinner held in the Great Hall of Clare College on 25 March 2000.

== Child sexual abuse and honours forfeiture ==
Chesshyre was charged with offences of child sexual abuse and in October 2015 stood trial before a jury sitting at Snaresbrook Crown Court. The offences pertained to a teenage male, and took place during the 1990s. Chesshyre was determined to be unfit to plead due to a stroke and dementia. The trial therefore went ahead as a trial of the facts. The jury found unanimously that he had committed two of the offences charged against him on the indictment. However, no conviction is formally recorded and the court consequently granted him an absolute discharge. The Honours and Appointments Secretariat, which is part of the Cabinet Office, said in evidence to the Independent Inquiry into Child Sexual Abuse that it "takes the view that the outcome of the trial holds equivalent weight to a full criminal investigation [and hence a criminal conviction]."

Despite a criminal finding of fact having been made, Sir Alan Reid, Secretary of the Royal Victorian Order, refused to recommend the forfeiture of Chesshyre's appointment to the order, stating that Chesshyre had not technically been convicted and that he had been given an absolute discharge. Following an appeal by the victim's MP, which led to the Prime Minister, Theresa May, seeking to have the original decision reviewed by an independent committee, Reid's decision was overturned and Chesshyre's award was forfeited with effect from 15 May 2018. Unusually, however, the forfeiture was not notified in the London Gazette, normally the standard procedure in such cases. At the time of his death, Chesshyre still held almost all the many other honours conferred upon him throughout his career, despite calls for these, too, to be revoked. The case avoided wide public knowledge, in part because Chesshyre's name was misspelled in court documents throughout his legal process, until March 2019, when it was mentioned at a public hearing of the Independent Inquiry into Child Sexual Abuse, which led in turn to an article in The Observer newspaper. According to journalist Jamie Doward, "When approached by the Observer, the various societies of which he [Chesshyre] is a member confirmed that they would not be dissociating themselves from him."

In response to calls by a number of its fellows, the Council of the Society of Antiquaries of London subsequently proposed a resolution to revoke Chesshyre's Fellowship. However, the Fellows present at the meeting on 24 October 2019 (109 out of a total of over 3,000) voted by 76 votes to 33 to reject the resolution, and to allow Chesshyre to remain a Fellow. In a statement the Council said that it "regrets that a majority of those present did not see fit to support the resolution", and was said to be "dismayed" by the outcome.

== Death ==
Chesshyre died on 24 December 2020, aged 80.

== Coat of arms ==
Coat of arms of Hubert Chesshyre
Notes Although Chesshyre's family coat of arms has been in use since the seventeenth century, it was only formally granted in 1970, when Chesshyre was himself first appointed a member of the College of Arms. Adopted 25 August 1970 Crest In front of a lure Or stringed & feathered Gules a lure Gules stringed & feathered Or Escutcheon Gules, two lions' gambs erased in chevron between three hawks lures Or

== List of publications ==
=== Books ===
- Carl Alexander von Volborth, Heraldry of the World, ed. D. H. B. Chesshyre, translated into English by Bob and Inge Gosney (London: Blandford Press, 1973)
- D. H. B. Chesshyre, The Identification of Coats of Arms on British Silver, drawings by Margaret J. Clark (London: Hawkslure Publications, 1978)
- A. J. Robinson and D. H. B. Chesshyre, The Green: A History of the Heart of Bethnal Green and the Legend of the Blind Beggar (1st edn., London: Borough of Tower Hamlets, 1978; 2nd edn., London: London Borough of Tower Hamlets, Central Library, 1986)
- D. H. B. Chesshyre and Adrian Ailes, Heralds of Today: A Biographical List of the Officers of the College of Arms, London, 1963–86, with a foreword by the Duke of Norfolk, KG, Earl Marshal of England (Gerrards Cross: Van Duren, 1986)
- D. H. B. Chesshyre and Thomas Woodcock, eds., Dictionary of British Arms: Medieval Ordinary vol. 1 (London: Society of Antiquaries of London, 1992)
- D. H. B. Chesshyre, Garter Banners of the Nineties (Windsor: College of Arms, 1998)
- Peter J. Begent and D. H. B. Chesshyre, The Most Noble Order of the Garter: 650 years, with a foreword by His Royal Highness the Duke of Edinburgh KG and a chapter on the statutes of the Order by Lisa Jefferson (London: Spink, 1999)
- D. H. B. Chesshyre and Adrian Ailes, Heralds of Today: A Biographical List of the Officers of the College of Arms, London, 1987–2001, with a foreword by the Earl of Arundel (London: Illuminata, 2001)

=== Book chapters ===
- D. H. B. Chesshyre, "The Most Noble Order of the Garter", in The Orders of the Thistle and the Garter (Kinross, 1989), pp. 27–46
- Anthony Harvey and Richard Mortimer, eds., The Funeral Effigies of Westminster Abbey (Woodbridge: Boydell, 1994; rev. edn. 2003) [contribution]
- D. H. B. Chesshyre, "The Modern Herald", in Patricia Lovett, The British Library Companion to Calligraphy, Illumination and Heraldry: A History and Practical Guide (London: British Library, 2000), pp. 257–268
- Peter Begent, Hubert Chesshyre, and Robert Harrison, "The Heraldic Windows of St George's Chapel", in A History of the Stained Glass of St George's Chapel, Windsor Castle, ed. Sarah Brown (Historical monographs relating to St. George's Chapel, Windsor Castle, vol. 18; Windsor: Dean and Canons of Windsor, 2005)

=== Reference work articles ===
- Stephen Friar, ed., A Dictionary of Heraldry (New York: Harmony Books, 1987) (author of articles on "Garter, Order of", pp. 160–2; "Grant of Arms", pp. 171–2; "Pedigrees, Proof and Registration of", pp. 264–5)
- D. H. B. Chesshyre, "Sir Edward Walker (1612–1677)", The Oxford Dictionary of National Biography (Oxford: Oxford University Press, 2004)

=== Journal articles ===
- P. J. Begent and D. H. B. Chesshyre, "The Fitzwilliam Armorial Plate in St George's Chapel, Windsor", The Coat of Arms, NS 4 (1980–82), no. 114, pp. 269–74
- P. J. Begent and D. H. B. Chesshyre, "The Spencer-Churchill Augmentations", The Coat of Arms, NS 6 (1984–86), no. 134, pp. 151–5
- D. H. B. Chesshyre, "Canting Heraldry", The Coat of Arms, NS 7 (1987–89), no. 138, pp. 29–31
- Hubert Chesshyre, "The Heraldry of the Garter Banners", Report of the Society of the Friends of St George's and the Descendants of the Knights of the Garter, vol. VII, no. 6 (1994/5), pp. 245–55
- In addition to the above, Chesshyre was also formerly a regular contributor to the journal British History Illustrated

=== Book reviews ===
- D. H. B. Chesshyre, review of Richard Marks and Ann Payne, eds., British Heraldry from its Origins to c. 1800 (London: British Museum Publications, 1978), The Antiquaries Journal, vol. 59, issue 2 (1979), pp. 460–461
- D. H. B. Chesshyre, review of G. D. Squibb, Precedence in England and Wales (Oxford: Clarendon Press, 1981), The Antiquaries Journal, vol. 62, issue 2 (1982), pp. 435–436

=== Unpublished MSS ===
- D. H. B. Chesshyre, "Number Seventeen, or the History of 17 Old Ford Road, Bethnal Green and the Natt Family" (Unpublished MS, c. 1970–80; Tower Hamlets Local History Library and Archives L.6160 (class 040))
- D. H. B. Chesshyre, "The Restoration of the Regalia to the Tomb of Queen Elizabeth the First in Westminster Abbey: Research into the Identity of the Collar Missing from the Queen's Marble Effigy" (Unpublished MS, 1973; The National Archives SAL/MS/852)

Heraldic offices
Preceded by Rodney Dennys	Rouge Croix Pursuivant; 1970 – 1978	Succeeded by Sir Thomas Woodcock
Preceded by Sir Walter Verco	Chester Herald; 1978 – 1995	Succeeded by Timothy Duke
Preceded by John Brooke-Little	Norroy and Ulster King of Arms; 1995 – 1997	Succeeded by Sir Thomas Woodcock
Preceded by John Brooke-Little	Clarenceux King of Arms; 1997 – 2010	Succeeded by Patric Dickinson
Preceded by Sir Conrad Swan	Registrar of the College of Arms; 1992 – 2000	Succeeded by Timothy Duke
Honorary titles
Preceded by n/a	Green Staff Officer at the Investiture of the Prince of Wales; 1 July 1969	Succeeded by n/a
Preceded by Sir Walter Verco	Honorary Genealogist to the Royal Victorian Order; 1987 – 2010	Succeeded by David White
Preceded by Sir Walter Verco	Secretary of the Order of the Garter; 1988 – 2004	Succeeded by Patric Dickinson
