= Inspector of Regimental Colours =

The Inspector of Regimental Colours is an officer of arms responsible for the design of standards, colours and badges of the British Army and of those Commonwealth states where the College of Arms has heraldic jurisdiction. The office was created in 1806, and is currently held by David White, Garter Principal King of Arms.

== History ==
From 1747 the Crown exercised control over the design of the colours carried by regiments of foot of the British Army, which had previously been unregulated and subject to the whim of the colonel of the unit concerned. From that date only devices or badges granted by royal authority were to borne on colours or clothing. A royal warrant dated 19 December 1768 restated these principles and also included cavalry regiments. From 1770 the general officers making inspections of troops were instructed to ensure that colours were in conformity with the 1768 warrant. However, they had little knowledge of the correct emblazoning of heraldic devices, and regiments frequently turned to the officers of the College of Arms for advice on the matter. Delays in issuing new colours due to doubts about the regulation design meant that old ones remained in service long after they had become unserviceable: for example the colours of the 9th (East Norfolk) Regiment of Foot were found in 1798 to be "...nothing but rags, so that no device or number could be seen on them".

In 1803 and 1804 the Board of Ordnance, which was the agency responsible for providing colours to the troops, exchanged correspondence with George Nayler, York Herald, about the delay in issuing colours. It was a result of this that the office of Inspector of Regimental Colours was instituted on 4 June 1806, with Nayler appointed to the post. Nayler immediately contacted the various regiments seeking details of their colours and ensuring that they were in conformity with the 1768 warrant. From that date the office of the inspector has prepared official paintings and from 1855 assumed responsibility for militia colours and from 1908 those of yeomanry and infantry regiments of the Territorial Force.

== The office today ==
The Inspector of Regimental Colours approves the design of all colours, guidons, standards, cap badges and defence agency insignia. Artwork of the design is executed by an heraldic artist at the College of Arms and is signed by the inspector and by the King.

== List of Inspector of Regimental Colours ==
Dates	Name	Offices held in College of Arms
4 June 1806 – 28 October 1831	George Nayler (knighted 1813)	York Herald until 1820, Clarenceux King of Arms 1820–1822, Garter Principal King of Arms 1822–1831
11 November 1831 – 25 July 1842	William Woods (knighted 1832)	Clarenceux King of Arms until 1838, Garter Principal King of Arms 1838–1842
28 July 1842 – 7 January 1904	Albert William Woods (knighted 1869)	Lancaster Herald (until 1869), Garter Principal King of Arms 1869–1904
22 June 1904 – 22 June 1929	Henry Farnham Burke (knighted 1919)	Somerset Herald until 1911, Norroy King of Arms 1911–1919, Garter Principal King of Arms 1919–1930
23 June 1929 – 4 March 1957	Gerald Woods Woolaston (knighted 1930)	Norroy King of Arms until 1930, Garter Principal King of Arms 1930–1944, Norroy and Ulster King of Arms 1944–1957
30 May 1957 – 5 July 1961	Sir George Rothe Bellew	Garter Principal King of Arms until 1961
10 August 1961 – 1977	Sir Anthony Richard Wagner	Garter Principal King of Arms 1961–1978
1977–1978	John Riddell Bromhead Walker	Clarenceux King of Arms 1968–1978
1978–1992	Sir Alexander Colin Cole	Garter Principal King of Arms 1978–1992
August 1993 – 1995	Sir Conrad Marshall John Fisher Swan	Garter Principal King of Arms 1993–1995
2 October 1995 – March 2010	Sir Peter Llewelyn Gwynn-Jones	Garter Principal King of Arms 1995–2010
April 2010–1 August 2021	Sir Thomas Woodcock	Garter Principal King of Arms 2010–2021
1 August 2021–present	David White	Garter Principal King of Arms since 1 July 2021
