= The Diagnostic Society of Edinburgh =

Debating society

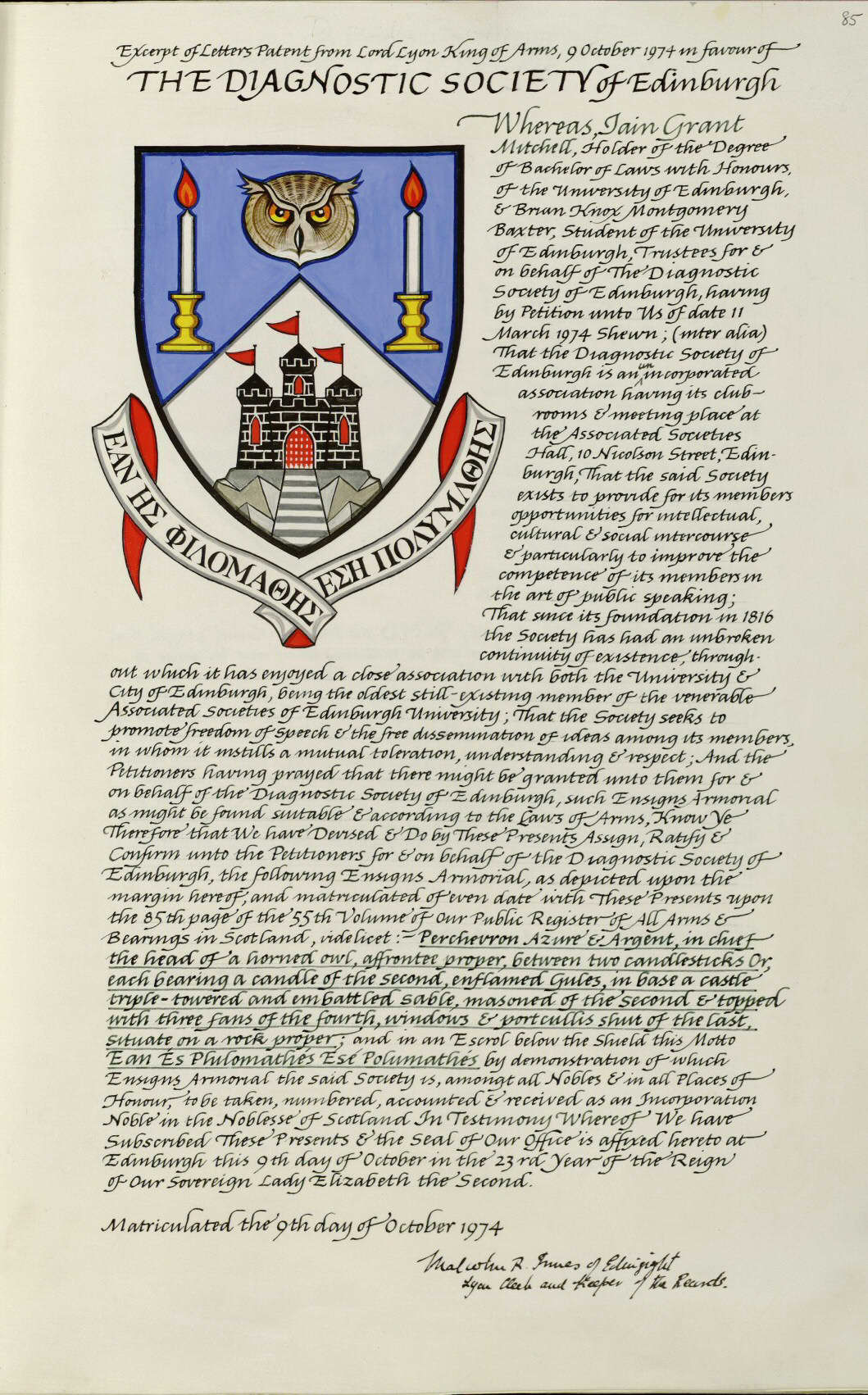
The grant of arms to the Diagnostic Society

The Diagnostic Society of Edinburgh is a debating society in Edinburgh, Scotland. The Diagnostic Society was founded in 1816 and traces its history back to the foundation of the Dialectic Society of Edinburgh in 1787, the two societies merging sometime in the 1960s, thus it claims to be the oldest debating society in UK. Each meeting is lit by candlelight.

The Diagnostics Society of Edinburgh was granted an official coat of arms in 1974, the first student society to do so until the Cambridge University Heraldic and Genealogical Society in 2007.

The society featured in Edinburgh's Decolonised Transformations, as in 1792 its members overwhelming voted against the slave trade and in a different debate concluded that "‘use of the produce of slavery involve[d] [them] in its guilt’ and agreed to abstain from consuming sugar.

Little is known about the Diagnostic Society, its records being held by University of Edinburgh.

== See also ==
- Speculative Society
