= Timothy Duke =

British officer of arms

Timothy Duke CVO EsqStJ FSA
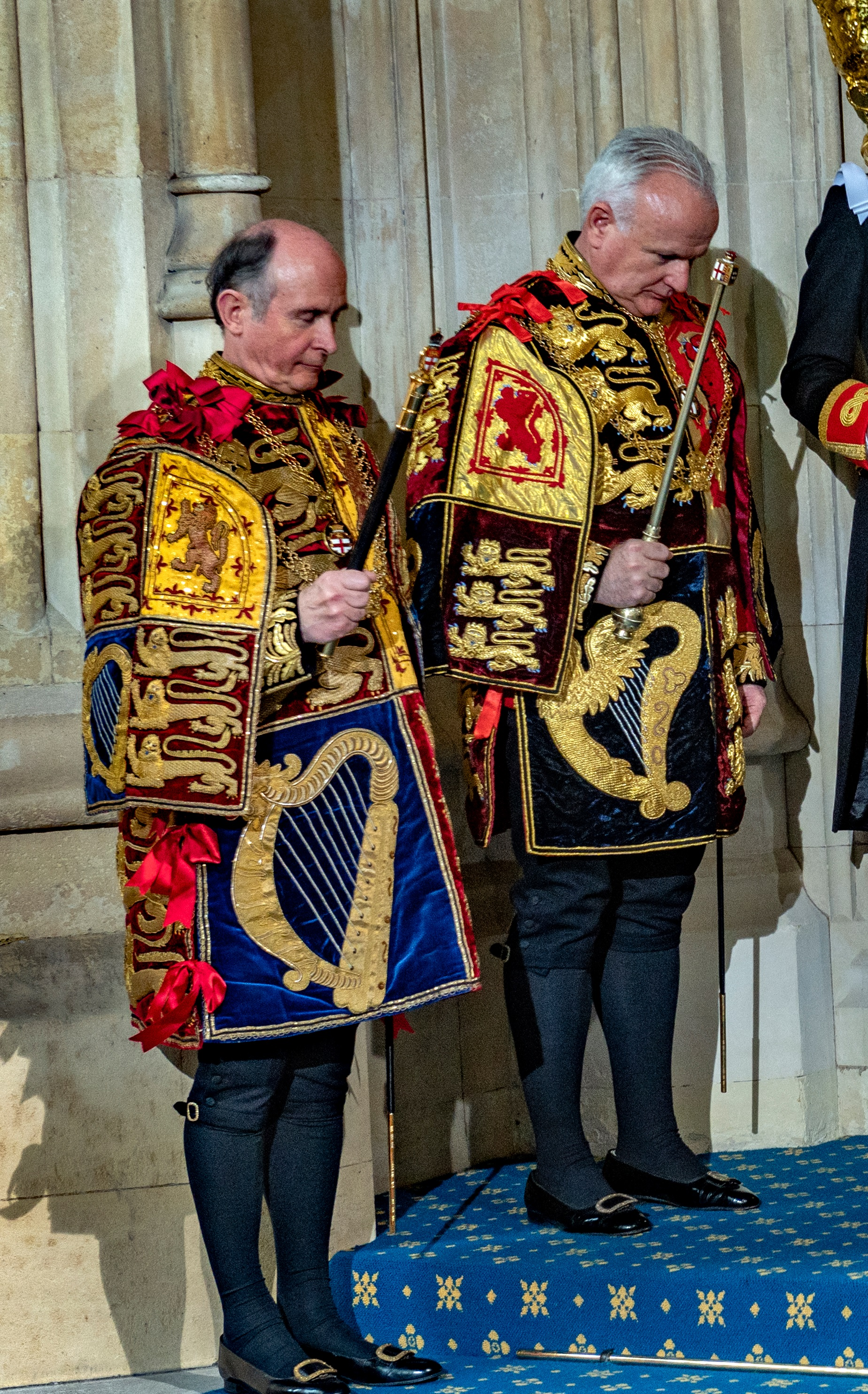
- Duke with David White (right) at the 2022 State Opening of Parliament

Clarenceux King of Arms
- In office 1 April 2021 – 30 September 2024
- Monarchs: Elizabeth II; Charles III
- Preceded by: Patric Dickinson
- Succeeded by: Robert Noel

Personal details
- Born: Timothy Hugh Stewart Duke; 12 June 1953 (age 73)
- Education: Fitzwilliam College, Cambridge

Timothy Hugh Stewart Duke, CVO EsqStJ FSA (born 12 June 1953) is a retired officer of arms at the College of Arms in London.

== Career ==
Timothy Duke is the son of William Falcon Duke and his wife, Mary Cecile, née Jackson. He was educated at Uppingham School and then Fitzwilliam College, Cambridge, graduating with a BA degree and later proceeding to MA. He served as a research assistant at the College from 1981, before he began his career as an officer of arms in 1989 when he was appointed Rouge Dragon Pursuivant of Arms in Ordinary. He held this position until 7 August 1995, when he was appointed Chester Herald of Arms in Ordinary. He was appointed Norroy and Ulster King of Arms on 1 July 2014. On 1 April 2021, he was appointed Clarenceux King of Arms in succession to Patric Dickinson. In that role, he proclaimed the accession of Charles III from the Royal Exchange in the City of London on 10 September 2022, and took part in the Royal Procession at the Coronation of Charles III and Camilla. He retired from the College of Arms on 30 September 2024.

He became an Esquire of the Order of St John in 1988, Honorary Secretary of the Harleian Society in 1994, and in 2010 was appointed Honorary Genealogist to the Order of St Michael and St George. He was Secretary of the College of Arms Trust from 1995 until 2024. In 2018, Duke was elected a Fellow of the Society of Antiquaries of London.

== Decorations ==
- 2002: Queen Elizabeth II Golden Jubilee Medal
- 2012: Queen Elizabeth II Diamond Jubilee Medal
- 2022: Queen Elizabeth II Platinum Jubilee Medal
- 2023: King Charles III Coronation Medal

== Arms ==
Coat of arms of Timothy Hugh Stewart Duke
Adopted 12 June 1995 Crest A Bengal Tiger passant guardant proper emerging from standing wheat and gorged with a coronet gold. Escutcheon Per fess sable and Or, a fess per fess between two cotises their outer edges in the form of the upper rim of a Ducal Coronet all counterchanged. Motto MANEAT INTEGRITAS (Latin roughly for "He would maintain soundness")

== See also ==
- Heraldry
- Pursuivant
- Herald

== Notes ==
Heraldic offices
Preceded by Patric Dickinson	Rouge Dragon Pursuivant; 1989 – 1995	Succeeded by Clive Cheesman
Preceded by Hubert Chesshyre	Chester Herald; 1995 – 2014	Succeeded by Christopher Fletcher-Vane
Preceded by Hubert Chesshyre	Registrar of the College of Arms; 2000 – 2007	Succeeded by William Hunt
Preceded by Sir Henry Paston-Bedingfeld	Norroy and Ulster King of Arms; 2014 – 2021	Succeeded by Robert Noel
Preceded by Patric Dickinson	Clarenceux King of Arms; 2021 – 2024	Succeeded by Robert Noel
