= Sedley Andrus =

Francis Sedley Andrus LVO
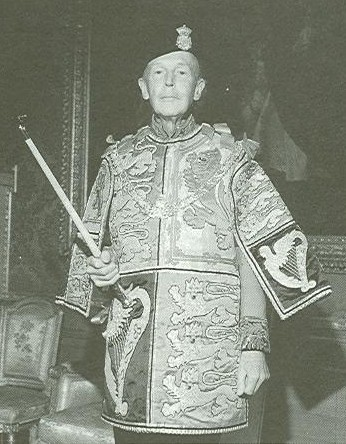
- Francis Sedley Andrus wearing a tabard as Beaumont Herald of Arms Extraordinary

Lancaster Herald of Arms
- In office 1972-1982
- Preceded by: John Walker
- Succeeded by: Peter Gwynn-Jones

Personal details
- Born: February 26, 1915
- Died: 9 November 2009 (aged 94) Longfield, Kent
- Education: St Peter's College, Oxford.
- Occupation: Officer of arms

Francis Sedley Andrus LVO (26 February 1915 – 9 November 2009) was a long-serving English officer of arms who was Beaumont Herald of Arms Extraordinary. As such, he was a Royal officer of arms, though not a member of the College of Arms in London.

Andrus was born in 1915, the son of Brigadier-General Thomas Alchin Andrus and Alice Loveday (née Parr). He was educated at Wellington College and St Peter's College, Oxford.

On the maternal side of his family, he was descended from Randle Smith of Oldhaugh, Cheshire, the father of William Smith who was created Rouge Dragon Pursuivant of Arms in Ordinary on 23 October 1597. The tradition of armorial interest continued with Andrus. In July 1938, Andrus was interviewed by Alfred Trego Butler, who was Windsor Herald of Arms in Ordinary at the time. Andrus had hoped to become part of Butler's staff at the College of Arms.

After Andrus had worked for Butler for a year, his career at the College of Arms was interrupted by the outbreak of World War II. As he was deemed unfit for military service, he spent the duration of the War doing farm work. On his return in October 1946, Butler had become very ill. In that year, Butler asked Anthony Wagner, who was serving as Richmond Herald of Arms in Ordinary, to take on both his clients and his young protégé. Wagner employed Andrus until 1970, when he was appointed Bluemantle Pursuivant of Arms in Ordinary. This appointment lasted until 1972, when he was promoted to the office of Lancaster Herald of Arms in Ordinary. On 1 March 1982, Andrus retired from the position of Lancaster to take on the office of Beaumont Herald Extraordinary. Andrus died on 9 November 2009. At the time of his death, he was one of only a few people remaining at the College of Arms who had any experience before World War II. He was also one of the few remaining officers of arms who had been a part of the coronation of Queen Elizabeth II in 1953.

== See also ==
- Heraldry
- Pursuivant
- Herald

Heraldic offices
| Preceded by John Brooke-Little | Bluemantle Pursuivant; 1970 – 1972 | Succeeded by Sir Peter Gwynn-Jones |
| Preceded by John Walker | Lancaster Herald; 1972 – 1982 | Succeeded by Sir Peter Gwynn-Jones |
