= Rodney Dennys =

British officer of arms

Lieutenant-Colonel Rodney Dennys CVO OBE FSA

Somerset Herald
- In office 1967–1982
- Monarch: Elizabeth II
- Preceded by: Michael Trappes-Lomax
- Succeeded by: Sir Thomas Woodcock

Personal details
- Born: 16 July 1911
- Died: 13 August 1993 (aged 82)

Rodney Onslow Dennys, CVO, OBE, FSA (16 July 1911 – 13 August 1993) was a British foreign service operative and long-serving officer of arms at the College of Arms in London. During World War II he served in the Intelligence Corps of the British Army.

== Early life ==
Rodney Dennys was born on 16 July 1911 at Ipoh, Perak, in the colony of British Malaya, where his father Frederick Dennys was a civil servant. He was educated at Canford School, before joining the Foreign Office.

== Career ==
Dennys joined the Foreign Service in 1937. During World War II, he was a member of the Intelligence Corps. For his war work in the Middle East, he was appointed an Officer of the Order of the British Empire (OBE) on 14 October 1943. He returned to the Foreign Office, serving in various intelligence posts, including Cairo, Ankara and Paris, where he was First Secretary. He was granted the honorary rank of lieutenant-colonel on 1 January 1949, and relinquished his commission in 1966, retaining that rank.

Dennys joined the staff at the College of Arms in 1958. His first heraldic appointment came on 8 August 1961 when he was appointed Rouge Croix Pursuivant of Arms in Ordinary to replace Walter Verco. He continued in this office until 1967 when he was appointed Somerset Herald of Arms in Ordinary. He held this position until his retirement in 1982, after which he was granted the post of Arundel Herald of Arms Extraordinary. In 1969 he was made a Member (4th Class) of the Royal Victorian Order (MVO), on the occasion of the Investiture of the Prince of Wales, in the 1982 New Year Honours he was promoted to Commander (CVO). In 1983 he was appointed High Sheriff of East Sussex.

== Personal life ==
Dennys's wife, Elizabeth, was a sister of the late Graham Greene. They had one son and two daughters.

== Publications ==
- Rodney Dennys. The Heraldic Imagination. New York: Clarkson N. Potter, 1975.
- Rodney Dennys. Heraldry and the Heralds. London: Jonathan Cape, 1982 and 1984.

== See also ==
- Heraldry
- Pursuivant
- Herald

Heraldic offices
Preceded by Sir Walter Verco	Rouge Croix Pursuivant; 1961 – 1967	Succeeded by Hubert Chesshyre
Preceded by Michael Trappes-Lomax	Somerset Herald; 1967 – 1982	Succeeded by Sir Thomas Woodcock
