= Patric Dickinson (officer of arms) =

English genealogist

Patric Dickinson CVO
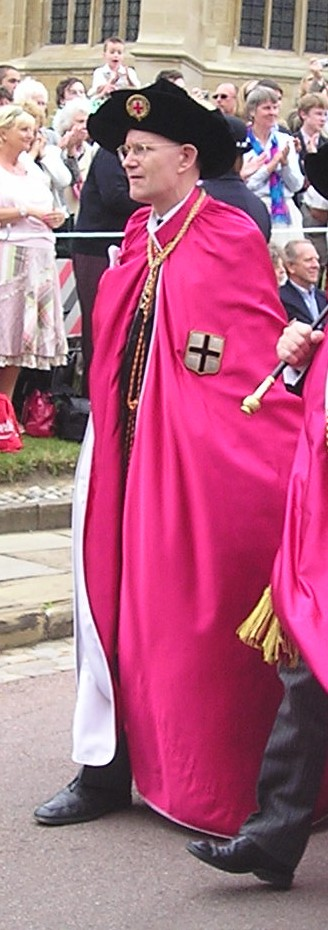
- Dickinson robed as Secretary of the Order of the Garter

Clarenceux King of Arms
- In office 1 September 2010 – 1 April 2021
- Monarch: Elizabeth II
- Preceded by: Hubert Chesshyre
- Succeeded by: Timothy Duke

Personal details
- Born: 24 November 1950 (age 75)
- Education: Marling School; Exeter College, Oxford
- Occupation: Genealogist
- Salary: £20.25 (as a provincial King of Arms) £17.80 (as a Herald) £13.95 (as a Pursuivant)
- Awards: LVO 2006; CVO 2024
- Website: www.college-of-arms.gov.uk

Patric Laurence Dickinson CVO (born 24 November 1950) is a former English officer of arms. He served as Clarenceux King of Arms from 2010 until 2021. He has worked at the College of Arms in London since 1968.

== Background ==
Dickinson was educated at Marling School in Stroud, Gloucestershire, before going to Exeter College, Oxford, where he read modern history and graduated as MA. He was President of the Oxford Union Society and was subsequently called to the Bar at the Middle Temple. Dickinson served as a research assistant at the College of Arms from 1968 until his appointment as Rouge Dragon Pursuivant of Arms in Ordinary in 1978. He served as Richmond Herald from 25 January 1989 until 6 April 2010.

On 6 April 2010, he was promoted to the office of Norroy and Ulster King of Arms, holding this office very briefly until he was further advanced to Clarenceux King of Arms on 1 September 2010. He was succeeded in April 2021 by Timothy Duke. In 2004, Dickinson was named Secretary of the Order of the Garter. He was succeeded in April 2024 by Lieutenant Colonel Stephen Segrave. He is also, among other things, a vice-president of the Anthony Powell Society and was elected President of the Society of Genealogists in 2005.

== Honours ==
Dickinson was appointed Lieutenant of the Royal Victorian Order (LVO) in the 2006 New Year Honours and Commander of the Royal Victorian Order (CVO) in the 2024 New Year Honours.

=== Medals ===
- 2012: Queen Elizabeth II Diamond Jubilee Medal

=== Academic ===
- Fellow 2000: Society of Genealogists (FSG)

== Arms ==
Coat of arms of Patric Laurence Dickinson
Adopted 2 March 1984 Crest A male griffin segreant Gules armed, beaked and rayed Or holding up a torch inflamed proper. Escutcheon Per saltire dovetailed argent and azure, in pale two lymphads sails furled pennons and flags flying gules. Motto DIC IN SONIS HONESTIS

== See also ==
- Heraldry
- Pursuivant
- King of Arms

Heraldic offices
Preceded by Theobald Mathew	Rouge Dragon Pursuivant; 1978–1989	Succeeded by Timothy Duke
Preceded by Michael Maclagan	Richmond Herald; 1989–2010	Succeeded by Clive Cheesman
Preceded by Sir Thomas Woodcock	Norroy and Ulster King of Arms; 2010	Succeeded by Sir Henry Paston-Bedingfeld
Preceded by Hubert Chesshyre	Clarenceux King of Arms; 2010–2021	Succeeded by Timothy Duke
Honorary titles
Preceded by Hubert Chesshyre	Secretary of the Order of the Garter; 2004–2024	Succeeded by Stephen Segrave
