= Cecil Humphery-Smith =

British genealogist, herald, biochemist, and mycologist (1928–2021)

- Born: 29 October 1928
- Died: 12 January 2021 (aged 92)
- Education: Hurstpierpoint College, University of London, London School of Hygiene & Tropical Medicine
- Occupation(s): Biochemist and mycologist, genealogist and heraldist

Cecil Raymond Julian Humphery-Smith OBE FSA FHS FRHSC (29 October 1928 – 12 January 2021) was a British genealogist and heraldist.

== Early life ==
Cecil Humphery-Smith was born on 29 October 1928 to Frederick Humphery-Smith of Burgess Hill, West Sussex, a company secretary appointed MBE in 1951 for his role as honorary secretary of the Burgess Hill Savings Committee, and his wife Agnes Violet (née Boxall). His godfather was the priest and headmaster Julian Bickersteth, who encouraged the development of the Institute of Heraldic and Genealogical Studies and in whose memory Humphery-Smith established a prize at the institute. He was educated at Hurstpierpoint College and, after graduating from the University of London in 1950 with a BSc, undertook postgraduate studies in Biochemistry and Mycology at the London School of Hygiene & Tropical Medicine and the Parma-Piacenza Department of Agronomy.

== Career ==
Following some years in Italy working with tomatoes for Heinz and other companies, it was Humphery-Smith who brought the concept of family history to the world of genealogy with his 1957 lecture "Introducing Family History." In 1961, he founded the Institute of Heraldic and Genealogical Studies in Canterbury and edited its journal, FAMILY HISTORY between 1962 and 2021. In 2008 Humphery-Smith was awarded an honorary Fellowship of Canterbury Christ Church University.

Humphery-Smith was a lecturer at University of London, amongst other institutions, for much of his professional career. He also served as a Fellow with the International Commission on Orders of Chivalry. He long was the only British member of Council of L'Académie Internationale d'Héraldique and received several other academic and literary honours and awards from around the world. In 2004, he was made an Officer of the Most Excellent Order of the British Empire for "Services to Education in Heraldry and Genealogy."

After being severely injured by a reversing vehicle in a car park in 2005 Humphery-Smith gave up lecturing, but continued to edit the Family History journal.

== Personal life ==
In 1951, Humphery-Smith married Alice Elizabeth Gwendoline Cogle (d. 2017); they had one son and five daughters.

== See also ==
- The Heraldry Society
