= Peter Gwynn-Jones =

British officer of arms (1940–2010)

Sir Peter Gwynn-Jones KCVO KStJ FSA
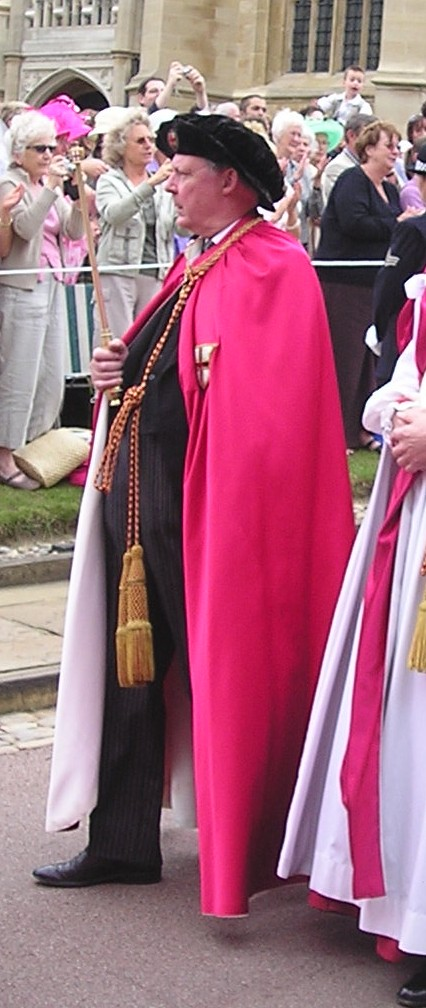
- Gwynn-Jones, in his capacity as Garter Principal King of Arms, taking part in the Garter Day procession at Windsor Castle.

Garter Principal King of Arms
- In office 1995–2010
- Monarch: Elizabeth II
- Preceded by: Sir Conrad Swan
- Succeeded by: Sir Thomas Woodcock

Personal details
- Born: 12 March 1940
- Died: 21 August 2010 (aged 70)
- Education: Wellington
- Alma mater: Trinity College, Cambridge
- Awards: Lieutenant of the Royal Victorian Order 1994; Commander of the Royal Victorian Order 1998; Knight Commander of the Royal Victorian Order 2010

Sir Peter Llewellyn Gwynn-Jones KCVO KStJ FSA (12 March 1940 – 21 August 2010) was a long-serving Officer of Arms at the College of Arms in London. He was Garter Principal King of Arms, the senior English officer of arms, from 1995 to 2010.

== Life and career ==
Gwynn-Jones was born in 1940, the son of Major Jack Gwynn-Jones, of Cape Town. He was educated at Wellington College, and Trinity College, Cambridge, where he obtained an MA. In 1970 he joined the College of Arms and became assistant to Sir Anthony Richard Wagner, who was the Garter Principal King of Arms. In 1973 Gwynn-Jones was appointed Bluemantle Pursuivant of Arms in Ordinary. In 1982 he was promoted to herald, and served until 1995 as Lancaster Herald of Arms in Ordinary and became House Comptroller of the College of Arms. In 1995 he was appointed Garter Principal King of Arms. He retired in 2010. He died later that year on 21 August.

== Appointments and honours ==
Gwynn-Jones was Secretary of the Harleian Society from 1981 until 1994, Inspector of Regimental Colours from 2 October 1995, and Inspector of Royal Air Force Badges from 1996. He was also appointed in 1995 Genealogist to the Order of the Bath, Genealogist of the Order of St Michael and St George, and Genealogist of the Most Venerable Order of the Hospital of Saint John of Jerusalem. He was non-executive Vice-President of The Heraldry Society from 1996.

Gwynn-Jones was appointed Lieutenant of the Royal Victorian Order (LVO) in 1994, promoted Commander of the Royal Victorian Order (CVO) in 1998, and appointed Knight of Justice of the Most Venerable Order of the Hospital of Saint John of Jerusalem (KStJ) in 1995. In anticipation of his retirement The Queen promoted Gwynn-Jones Knight Commander of the Royal Victorian Order (KCVO) in the 2010 New Year Honours.

== The Coati Sable ==
Gwynn-Jones's autobiography, The Coati Sable: The Story of a Herald, was published by The Memoir Club in 2010, coinciding with his retirement as Garter The title is a reference to the coati (a type of American raccoon) that featured on Gwynn-Jones's own coat of arms and served as a punning allusion to Coity, Glamorganshire.

== Arms ==
Coat of arms of Peter Gwynn-Jones
Notes This coat of arms represents the first effort at heraldic design by Gwynn-Jones. Adopted 8 May 1971 Crest A coati sejant sable collared and lined or. Escutcheon Argent gutty gules, a fret engrailed and molined at the mascle points sable Motto Dyfalbarhau ("Persevere") Orders the circlet of the Royal Victorian Order as KCVO. Symbolism "Gwynn" is Welsh for white. While the Red drops of blood on a white field represent his ancestors who had bettered themselves through careers in the army. The crest is a pun on the animal coati and his paternal forebears who came from Coity, Glamorganshire. The animal is also a favourite of the bearer who has seen it many times on his travels in Latin America.

== See also ==
- Heraldry
- Officer of Arms
- Pursuivant
- King of Arms

== Bibliography ==
- Gwynn-Jones, P. Ll. (1998) The Art of Heraldry : origins, symbols, designs, London : Parkgate, ISBN 1-85585-560-7
- Gwynn-Jones, P. Ll. (2010) The Coati Sable: The story of a Herald, Durham : The Memoir Club, ISBN 978-1-84104-205-3

Heraldic offices
Preceded by Francis Sedley Andrus	Bluemantle Pursuivant; 1973 – 1982	Succeeded by Terence McCarthy
Preceded by Francis Sedley Andrus	Lancaster Herald; 1982 – 1995	Succeeded by Robert Noel
Preceded by Sir Conrad Swan	Garter Principal King of Arms; 1995 – 2010	Succeeded by Sir Thomas Woodcock
