= David White (officer of arms) =

Garter King of Arms (born 1961)

Sir David White KCVO
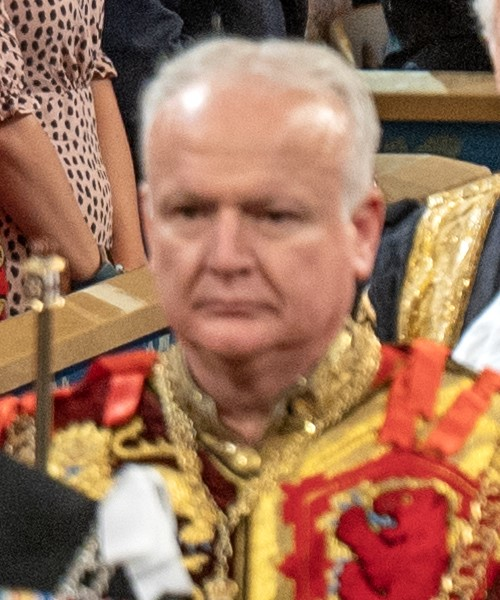
- White as Garter Principal King of Arms, in 2024

Garter Principal King of Arms
- In office 1 July 2021 – 30 June 2026
- Monarchs: Elizabeth II; Charles III
- Preceded by: Sir Thomas Woodcock
- Succeeded by: James Peill

Somerset Herald
- In office 2004–2021

Personal details
- Born: 27 October 1961 (age 64) Scotland
- Education: Pembroke College, Cambridge

Sir David Vines White KCVO (born 27 October 1961) is a retired officer of arms at the College of Arms in London. He served as Garter Principal King of Arms from 2021 until 30 June 2026.

During his tenure in office, Whit was senior herald and genealogist at the College of Arms in London, as Garter King of Arms, he was responsible for the governance of the law of arms in England and Wales, the succession of peerage and baronet titles, introducing new peers to the House of Lords, and oversight of royal ceremonial duties.

As Garter, he assisted the Earl Marshal in arranging the Royal Procession at the Coronation of Charles III and Camilla.

== Life ==
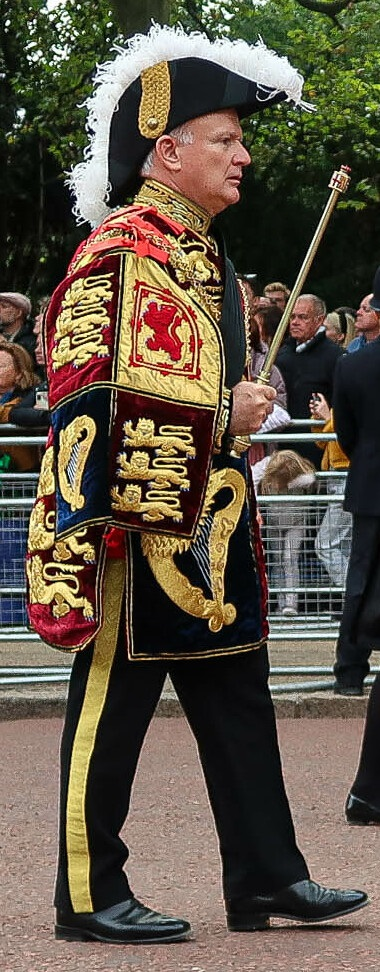
White in 2022

Born in Scotland, the younger son of Sheila (née Chatterton) and Peter Vines White (died 1999 at Shilton, Oxfordshire), he was educated at Marlborough College, before going up to Pembroke College, Cambridge, graduating as a Bachelor of Arts (subsequently promoted in the usual course to MA(Cantab)). As an undergraduate he was elected President of the Cambridge University Heraldic and Genealogical Society.

He then pursued postgraduate studies in the History of Art at the Courtauld Institute, receiving a second (graduate-level) MA degree from the University of London.

White served as a research assistant to Theobald Mathew, Windsor Herald, and contributor to Burke's Peerage & Baronetage. In 1995, he was appointed Rouge Croix Pursuivant, following in the tradition of eminent genealogists such as Sir Henry Farnham Burke and Sir Anthony Wagner. In 2004, he was advanced Somerset Herald, and from 2014 to 2021 also served as Registrar of the College of Arms.

On 1 July 2021, White was promoted Garter Principal King of Arms, succeeding Sir Thomas Woodcock upon his retirement. He was also appointed Inspector of Royal Air Force Badges effective from 1 July 2021. On 1 August 2021, White also became Inspector of Regimental Colours to the British Army.

A member of the Council of the Heraldry Society of London (Chairman 2006–09, now Hon. FHS) and of the British Record Society, White has served as Genealogist of the Most Honourable Order of the Bath since 2021, and as Honorary Genealogist of the Royal Victorian Order since 2010. He was Genealogist of the Most Venerable Order of St John of Jerusalem from 2021 to 2025. He is also a committee member of the Travellers' Club.

On 10 September 2022, as Garter King of Arms, White proclaimed the accession of Charles III from the Proclamation Gallery in Friary Court, St James's Palace, London before a global television audience. On 19 September 2022 he proclaimed the styles and titles of Elizabeth II over her descending coffin at the end of her committal service in St George's Chapel, Windsor.

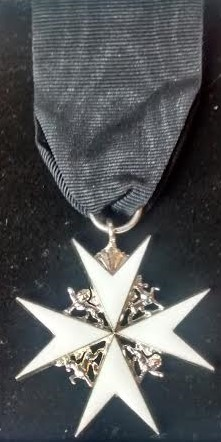
OStJ insignia

White was made a Knight Commander in the Royal Victorian Order in June 2026, and left the office of Garter King of Arms at the end of his term on 30 June 2026.

== Honours and decorations ==
- 2021: Officer of the Most Venerable Order of St John of Jerusalem
- 2012: Queen Elizabeth II Diamond Jubilee Medal
- 2022: Queen Elizabeth II Platinum Jubilee Medal
- 2023: King Charles III Coronation Medal
- 2026: Knight Commander of the Royal Victorian Order

== Arms ==
Coat of arms of David Vines White
Crest A cock's head erased sable combed and wattled gules gorged by three annulets engrailed argent. Escutcheon Argent goutty de sang three cocks' heads erased sable combed and wattled gules a bordure engrailed sable. Other versions White impales Garter King's arms (dexter) with his family arms (sinister) whilst in office.

== See also ==
- Burke's Peerage & Baronetage
- College of Arms
- Heraldry

Heraldic offices
Preceded by Sir Henry Paston-Bedingfeld	Rouge Croix Pursuivant; 1995 – 2004	Succeeded by John Allen-Petrie
Preceded by Sir Thomas Woodcock	Somerset Herald; 2004 – 2021	Succeeded by Mark Scott
Preceded by William Hunt	Registrar of the College of Arms; 2014 – 2021	Succeeded by Peter O'Donoghue
Preceded by Sir Thomas Woodcock	Garter Principal King of Arms; 2021 – 2026	Succeeded by James Peill
Honorary titles
Preceded by Hubert Chesshyre	Honorary Genealogist of the Royal Victorian Order; 2010 – 2026	Succeeded by ?
Preceded by Sir Thomas Woodcock	Genealogist of the Most Honourable Order of the Bath; 2021 – 2026	Succeeded by James Peill
Preceded by Sir Thomas Woodcock	Genealogist of the Most Venerable Order of St John; 2021 – 2025	Succeeded by Peter O'Donoghue
