= Thomas Woodcock (officer of arms) =

Genealogist (born 1951)

Sir Thomas Woodcock KCVO DL
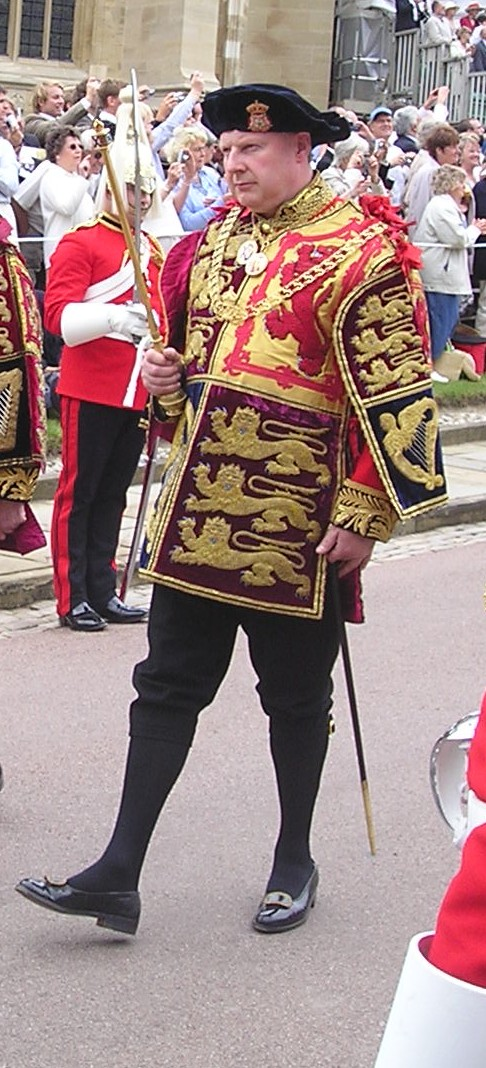
- Woodcock, Norroy and Ulster King of Arms, processing at the Garter Ceremony, 2006.

Garter Principal King of Arms
- In office 1 April 2010 – 1 July 2021
- Monarch: Elizabeth II
- Preceded by: Sir Peter Gwynn-Jones
- Succeeded by: David White

Personal details
- Born: 20 May 1951 (age 75)
- Spouse: Lucinda Harmsworth King (m. 1998)
- Education: University College, Durham; Darwin College, Cambridge
- Alma mater: Eton College
- Awards: Knight Commander of the Royal Victorian Order (2021); Officer of the Order of Saint John (2018)

Sir Thomas Woodcock KCVO DL FSA FHS FRHSC (born 20 May 1951) is a genealogist who served as Garter Principal King of Arms at the College of Arms from 2010 to 2021.

== Early life ==
Woodcock was educated at Eton College before going up to University College, Durham, where he graduated with a Bachelor of Arts degree. He then pursued further studies at Darwin College, Cambridge, becoming LLB. He was called to the Bar at the Inner Temple.

== Career ==
Woodcock began his heraldic career in 1975 as a research assistant to Sir Anthony Wagner, Garter King of Arms. In 1978, he was appointed Rouge Croix Pursuivant. In 1982, he was promoted to Somerset Herald, becoming Norroy and Ulster in 1997, then Garter Principal King of Arms on 1 April 2010. On 1 July 2021, Woodcock retired as Garter as well as his other heraldic and genealogical offices.

== Personal life ==
In 1998, Woodcock married Lucinda Harmsworth King.

== Honours ==
Woodcock was appointed Lieutenant of the Royal Victorian Order (LVO) in the 1996 Birthday Honours, promoted Commander of the Royal Victorian Order (CVO) in the 2011 Birthday Honours and Knight Commander of the Royal Victorian Order (KCVO) in the 2021 Birthday Honours.

In 2017, he succeeded William Hunt, Windsor Herald, as Genealogist of the Most Venerable Order of the Hospital of Saint John of Jerusalem serving until 2021, having been appointed in July 2018 an Officer of the Order (OStJ).

A Deputy Lieutenant for the County of Lancashire since December 2005, he assists the Lord Lieutenant, Amanda Parker, to represent King Charles III throughout the county.

Elected a Fellow of the Society of Antiquaries of London (FSA) on 3 March 1990, he was awarded the SAL's Society Medal in 2015. He was also elected a Fellow of The Heraldry Society (FHS) on 26 June 1996.

== Arms ==
Coat of arms of Thomas Woodcock
Adopted 20 April 1961 Crest Out of a circlet or charged with three roses gules barbed and seeded proper a dexter arm embowed in armour also proper garnished gold, the hand grasping a scimitar likewise proper hilt and pommel gold. Escutcheon Or on a bend cotised gules three cross crosslets fitchy of the field. Motto Leges Juraque Serva ("Observe the laws and ordinances") Orders the circlet of the Royal Victorian Order as KCVO.

== See also ==
- College of Arms – Corporation responsible for heraldry in England and Wales
- Herald – Officer of arms
- Heraldry – Discipline of the design and study of coats of arms
- King of Arms – Rank of an officer of arms
- Pursuivant – Junior officer of arms

Heraldic offices
Preceded by Hubert Chesshyre	Rouge Croix Pursuivant; 1978–1982	Succeeded by Sir Henry Paston-Bedingfeld
Preceded by Rodney Dennys	Somerset Herald; 1982–1997	Succeeded by David White
Preceded by Hubert Chesshyre	Norroy and Ulster King of Arms; 1997–2010	Succeeded by Patric Dickinson
Preceded by Sir Peter Gwynn-Jones	Garter Principal King of Arms; 2010–2021	Succeeded by David White
