= Clive Cheesman =

British officer of arms

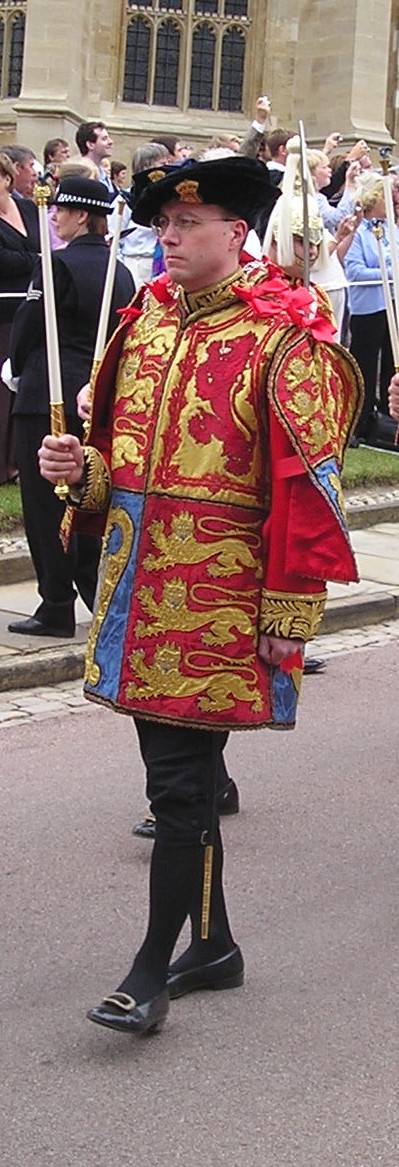
Cheesman as Rouge Dragon at the 2006 Garter Service, wearing his ceremonial tabard

Clive Edwin Alexander Cheesman FSA (born 1968) is a British officer of arms at the College of Arms in London. He is currently Norroy and Ulster King of Arms, having been appointed to that position on 14 November 2024.

== Background ==
Son of architect Wilfrid Henry Cheesman and his wife Elizabeth Amelia (née Hughes), a biochemist, Cheesman has a degree in Literae Humaniores (Classics or 'Greats') from Oxford University, where he was at Oriel. In 1993, he was awarded the degree of PhD from the Scuola Superiore di Studi Storici di San Marino, with a doctoral thesis on Roman history.

He is co-editor of The Heraldry Society's journal, The Coat of Arms, and from 2008 to 2013 was Chairman of The Friends of The National Archives. He received a Diploma in Law in 1995 from City University, London, and was called to the Bar of England and Wales as a member of Middle Temple in October 1996.

Cheesman was formerly a curator in the Department of Coins and Medals in the British Museum. He served as Rouge Dragon Pursuivant of Arms from November 1998 to April 2010, and Richmond Herald of Arms from April 2010 to November 2024. He was appointed Norroy and Ulster King of Arms in November 2024.

Cheesman's coat of arms was granted by the College of Arms shortly after his appointment as Rouge Dragon. On 31 December 1999, arms were granted with the blazon Per pale and per pall Argent and Sable. These were granted along with a crest blazoned A Crow Sable gorged with an ancient British Torque Or alighting on a man's Skull resting on its side Argent.

== Publications ==
- Cheesman, Clive, and Williams, Jonathan, Rebels, Pretenders and Impostors (London: British Museum Press, 2000), ISBN 0-312-23866-5.
- Cheesman, Clive (ed.), The Armorial of Haiti. Symbols of Nobility in the Reign of Henry Christophe. With a historical introduction by Marie-Lucie Vendryes and a preface by Her Excellency Michaëlle Jean, Governor-General of Canada (London: College of Arms, 2007), ISBN 978-0-9506980-2-1.

== Arms ==
Coat of arms of Clive Edwin Alexander Cheesman
Notes There is uniqueness to the arms in that they were the last to be granted in 1999 and the first to be signed by Chester Herald as Registrar. Mr Cheesman wanted a simple design. The rationale behind this simplicity is esoteric but the use of ordinaries in the arms could 'remind one of wedges of cheese!' The crest reflects Mr Cheesman's earlier involvement with ancient British and Romano-British antiques when employed at the British Museum, while also constituting a memento mori, a suitable reference to the passing of generations with which a genealogist is occupied. Adopted 31 December 1999 Crest A crow sable, gorged with an ancient British torque or alighting on a man's skull resting on its side argent. Escutcheon Per pale and per pall argent and sable. Motto REASON WILL RESPECT

== See also ==
- Heraldry
- Officer of Arms

Heraldic offices
Preceded by Timothy Duke	Rouge Dragon Pursuivant; 1998 – 2010	Succeeded by Adam Tuck
Preceded by Patric Dickinson	Richmond Herald; 2010 – 2024	Succeeded by James Peill
Preceded by Robert Noel	Norroy and Ulster King of Arms; 2024 – present	Incumbent
