= List of participants in the coronation procession of Elizabeth II =

The procession for the coronation of Elizabeth II was an element of the ceremony in which court, clerical, governmental, and parliamentary officials from around the Commonwealth of Nations moved in a set order of precedence through the streets of London, England, and into Westminster Abbey, where the coronation took place.

== Rulers of Protectorates ==
Pursuivants
Rouge Dragon Pursuivant of Arms Robin de La Lanne-Mirrlees	Portcullis Pursuivant of Arms Charles St Clair, Master of Sinclair
Rulers of Protectorates
HH The Sultan of Lahej	HH The Sultan of Brunei CMG
HH The Sultan of Perak KCMG OBE	HH The Sultan of Kelantan KCMG
HH The Tengku Ampuan of Selangor	HH The Sultan of Selangor KCMG
HH The Sultana of Johore	Major-General HH The Sultan of Johore GCMG GBE
HH The Sultana of Zanzibar	HH The Sultan of Zanzibar GCMG GBE
HM The Queen of Tonga GBE

== The Royal Family ==
Pursuivants and Ushers
Bluemantle Pursuivant of Arms James Frere		Rouge Croix Pursuivant of Arms John Walker
Gentleman Usher Captain Philip Neville, RN		Gentleman Usher Rear-Admiral Sir Arthur Bromley Bt KCMG CVO
Members of the Royal Family
HRH The Princess Royal CI GCVO GBE RRC TD her train borne by The Honourable Mrs Forbes her coronet borne by Master of Forbes
HRH Prince Richard of Gloucester	HRH The Duchess of Gloucester CI GCVO GBE her train borne by Lady Caroline Gilmour her coronet carried by Earl of Dalkeith	HRH Prince William of Gloucester
HRH The Duchess of Kent CI GCVO GBE her train borne by Lady Rachel Davidson her coronet carried by Philip Hay CVO
HRH Princess Alexandra of Kent her train borne by The Honourable Katharine Smith	HRH Prince Michael of Kent	HRH The Duke of Kent his coronet carried by his page The Honourable Henry Herbert
HRH Princess Alice, Countess of Athlone CI GCVO GBE her train borne by Mrs James Mure her coronet carried by Richard Abel Smith		Lady Patricia Ramsay CI her train borne by The Honourable Gillian Cecil her coronet carried by Captain Alexander Ramsay
Major-General The Earl of Athlone KG GCB GCMG GCVO DSO his coronet carried by his page Gerald Ward		HH Princess Marie Louise CI GCVO GBE RRC her train borne by Mrs Hugh Adams

== The Queen Mother and Princess Margaret ==
Heralds and Ushers
Somerset Herald Michael Trappes-Lomax	Windsor Herald Richard Graham-Vivian
Gentleman Usher Colonel Geoffrey Codrington CB CMG CVO DSO OBE TD	Gentleman Usher Lieutenant-Colonel Henry de Satgé CMG CVO DSO
Princess Margaret
HRH The Princess Margaret CI GCVO her train borne by Iris Peake her coronet carried by her page Albemarle Bowes-Lyon
HM Queen Elizabeth The Queen Mother
Richmond Herald Anthony Wagner	York Herald Aubrey Toppin
Chester Herald John Heaton-Armstrong	Lancaster Herald Archibald George Blomefield Russell
The Lord Chamberlain of the Queen Mother's Household Lieutenant-Colonel The Earl of Airlie KT GCVO MC his coronet carried by his page Robert Ramsay
HM Queen Elizabeth The Queen Mother
Her train borne by The Mistress of the Robes; The Dowager Duchess of Northumberland GCVO CBE assisted by:
Jonathan Peel	Michael Anson
Viscount Carlow	The Earl Erne
The coronet of the Mistress of the Robes carried by her page Lord James Douglas-Hamilton
Ladies of the Bedchamber
The Dowager Viscountess Hambledon	The Countess Spencer OBE
The Countess of Scarbrough	The Lady Harlech DCVO
Women of the Bedchamber
The Honourable Mrs John Mulholland	Lady Jean Rankin
Other Members of The Queen Mother's Household
Private Secretary Captain Oliver Dawnay	Treasurer Sir Arthur Horace Penn GCVO MC

== Chaplains ==
The Abbey Beadle
The Abbey Beadle G. F. Calvert
The Chaplains
The Very Reverend John Baillie (1886–1960)		The Reverend A. Nevile Davidson (1899–1976)
The Reverend Thomas Malcolm Layng CBE MC (1892–1958)		The Reverend Canon Henry Spencer Stephenson (1871–1957)
The Reverend Canon L. M. Andrews CVO MBE MC		The Reverend Philip Thomas Byard Clayton CH MC (1885–1972)
The Reverend Canon A. Rowland H. Grant CVO TD (died 1961)		The Reverend Canon C. E. Raven (1885–1964)
The Reverend Canon Guy Rogers MC (1876–1967)
The Domestic Chaplains
The Reverend John Lamb MC
The Reverend Hector Anderson MVO		The Reverend Maurice Foxell MVO (1888–1981)
The Representatives of the Free Churches
Chairman of the Congregational Union of England and Wales Ebenezer Cunningham (1881–1977)
Moderator of the Presbyterian Church of England The Right Reverend Professor T. W. Manson (1893–1958)		President of the Baptist Union The Reverend Henry Bonser (died 1966)
The President of the Methodist Conference The Reverend Colin Roberts (1886–1975)		Moderator of the Free Church Federal Council The Reverend Hugh Martin (1890–1964)
The Representatives of the Church of Scotland
Ex-Moderator of the General Assembly The Very Reverend Alexander Macdonald		Ex-Moderator of the General Assembly The Very Reverend John McKenzie CIE
The Right Reverend Professor James Pitt-Watson (1893–1962) Moderator of the General Assembly
The Dean and Prebendaries of Westminster
The Prebendaries' Virger A. J. R. Greaves (1910–2000)
The Cross of Westminster borne by the Reverend Christopher Hildyard (1901–1987) as deputy to the Minor Canon and Sacrist, the Reverend Jocelyn H. T. Perkins CVO (1869–1962)
The Reverend Canon Edward Carpenter (1910–1998)		The Reverend Canon Charles Smyth (1903–1987)
The Venerable Adam Fox (1883–1977)		The Reverend Canon Stephen Marriott (1886–1964)
The Dean's Virger G. C. Drake MVO
Dean of Westminster The Very Reverend Alan Campbell Don KCVO (1885–1966)
Heralds and Pursuivants
Fitzalan Pursuivant Extraordinary Alexander Colin Cole (1922–2001)	Portcullis Pursuivant of Arms Charles St Clair, Master of Sinclair (1914–2004)	Rouge Dragon Pursuivant of Arms Robin de la Lanne-Mirrlees (1925–2012)
Kintyre Pursuivant of Arms Captain Rupert Iain Kay Moncreiffe (1919–1985)	Unicorn Pursuivant of Arms Lieutenant-Colonel Gordon Dalyell of the Binns CIE (1887–1953)	Carrick Pursuivant of Arms James M. Grant (1903–1981)

== Officers of the Orders of Knighthood ==
The Most Excellent Order of the British Empire
The Gentleman Usher of the Purple Rod Sir Ernest Arthur Gowers GBE (1880–1966)
The Secretary Sir Edward Bridges GCB GCVO MC (1892–1969)	The King of Arms Air Marshal Sir Charles Roderick Carr KBE CB DFC AFC (1891–1971)
The Royal Victorian Order
The Chaplain The Reverend Cyril Cresswell CVO (1890–1974)
The Most Distinguished Order of St Michael and St George
The Gentleman Usher of the Blue Rod Admiral Sir Alan Geoffrey Hotham CB (1876–1965)	The Registrar Sir Percivale Liesching KCB (1895–1973)
The King of Arms Sir George Nevile Maltby Bland KCMG KCVO (1886–1972)	The Secretary Sir Thomas Lloyd GCMG KCB (1896–1968)
The Prelate The Right Reverend Wilfred Marcus Askwith, Bishop of Blackburn (1890–1962)
The Most Honourable Order of the Bath
The Deputy Secretary Brigadier Ivan de la Bere CVO CBE (1893–1970)	The Gentleman Usher of the Scarlet Rod Major-General Douglas Neil Wimberley CB DSO MC (1896–1983)
The Registrar and Secretary Air Vice-Marshal Sir Charles Alexander Holcombe Longcroft KCB CMG DSO AFC (1883–1958)	Bath King of Arms Air Chief Marshal Sir James Milne Robb GCB KBE DSO DFC AFC (1895–1968)
The Most Ancient and Most Noble Order of the Thistle
The Gentleman Usher of the Green Rod Colonel Sir Edward Daymonde Stevenson KCVO MC (1895–1958)
The Most Noble Order of the Garter
The Register The Right Reverend Eric Knightley Chetwode Hamilton, Dean of Windsor (1890–1962)	The Chancellor The Earl of Halifax KG OM GCSI GCIE TD (1881–1958) his coronet carried by his page, Benedick Peake

Heralds
Marchmont Herald Lieutenant-Colonel John William Balfour Paul DSO (1873–1957)	Rothesay Herald Lieutenant-Colonel Harold Andrew Balvaird Lawson (1899–1985)	Albany Herald Major Charles Ian Fraser of Reelig (1903–1963)

== Standards ==
Standards of the Commonwealth
The Standard of Ceylon borne by Sir Edwin A. P. Wijeyeratne KBE (1889–1968)	The Standard of Pakistan borne by Mirza Abol Hassan Ispahani (1902–1981)
The Standard of the Union of South Africa borne by Dr Albertus L. Geyer (1894–1969)	The Standard of New Zealand borne by Sir Frederick Widdowson Doidge KCMG (1884–1954)
The Standard of the Commonwealth of Australia borne by Sir Thomas Walter White KBE DFC VD (1888–1957)	The Standard of Canada borne by Norman Alexander Robertson (1904–1968)
The Union Standard
The Union Standard borne by Captain John Lindley Marmion Dymoke (the Queen's Champion) (1926–2015)
The Standard of the Principality of Wales
The Standard of the Principality of Wales borne by The Lord Harlech KG GCMG (1885–1964) his coronet carried by his page, Julian Ormsby-Gore (1940–1974)

Standards of the Quarterings of the Royal Arms
borne by
The Lord De L'Isle and Dudley VC (1909–1991) his coronet carried by his page, George Jeffreys (1939–2010)	The Earl of Derby MC (1918–1994) his coronet carried by his page, Viscount Throwley (1940–1996)	The Earl of Dundee, Hereditary Royal Standard-Bearer for Scotland (1902–1983) his coronet carried by his page, Christopher James Makins (1942–2006)
The Royal Standard borne by Field Marshal The Viscount Montgomery of Alamein KG GCB DSO (1887–1976) his coronet carried by his page, Nicholas Wright

== Members of the Royal Household ==
Members of the Royal Household
The Vice-Chamberlain of the Household; Sir Henry Gray Studholme (1899–1987)	The Treasurer of the Household; Sir Cedric Drewe (1896–1971)	The Comptroller of the Household; Major Sir Roger John Edward Conant (1899–1973)
The Keeper of the Jewel House bearing on a cushion the Ring, the Armills, and the Sword for the Offering; The Lord Hardinge of Penshurst GCB GCVO MC (1894–1960) acting for Major-General Sir Hervey Degge Wilmot Sitwell CB MC (1896–1973)

Pursuivants
Bluemantle Pursuivant; James A. Frere (1920–1994)	Rouge Croix Pursuivant; John Riddell Bromhead Walker MC (1913–1984)

The Knights of the Garter appointed to hold the Canopy for the Queen's Anointing
The Viscount Allendale KG CB CBE MC (1890–1956) his coronet carried by his page, George Andrew Beaumont (1938–1960)	The Earl Fortescue KG CB OBE MC (1888–1958) his coronet carried by his page, Viscount Chewton (born 1940)
The Duke of Wellington KG (1885–1972) his coronet carried by his page, Michael Thomas Jeremy Clyde (born 1941)	The Duke of Portland KG (1893–1977) his coronet carried by his page, The Honourable Bruce Hacking (born 1940)

Members of the Royal Household
The Lord Chamberlain of the Household; The Earl of Scarbrough KG GCSI GCIE TD (1896–1969) his coronet carried by his page, David McEwen (1938–1976)	The Lord Steward of the Household; The Duke of Hamilton and Brandon KT GCVO AFC (1903–1973) his coronet carried by his page, Marquess of Clydesdale (1938–2010)
The Lord Keeper of the Privy Seal; The Right Honourable Henry Frederick Comfort Crookshank (1893–1961)

== Prime Ministers of the Commonwealth of Nations ==
Prime ministers of the Members of the Commonwealth
The prime minister of Ceylon The Honourable Dudley Shelton Senanayake (1911–1973)
The prime minister of Pakistan The Honourable Muhammad Ali Bogra (1909–1963)	The prime minister of India Jawaharlal Nehru (1889–1964)
The prime minister of the Union of South Africa The Honourable Daniel François Malan (1874–1959)	The prime minister of New Zealand The Right Honourable Sidney George Holland CH (1893–1961)
The prime minister of the Commonwealth of Australia The Right Honourable Robert Gordon Menzies CH QC (1894–1978)	The prime minister of Canada The Right Honourable Louis Stephen Saint-Laurent QC (1882–1973)
The prime minister of the United Kingdom The Right Honourable Sir Winston Spencer Churchill KG OM CH TD (1874–1965)

== Archbishops and the Lord Chancellor ==
Archbishop of York
The Cross of York

borne by the Reverend T. W. I. Cleasby (1920–2009)

Archbishop of York

The Most Reverend and Right Honourable Cyril Forster Garbett (1875–1955)

attended by the Reverend Prebendary Philip William Wheeldon OBE (1913–1992)

The Lord Chancellor
The Lord High Chancellor

The Lord Simonds (1881–1971)

attended by his Pursebearer, T. Cokayne

his coronet carried by his page
Andrew Parker Bowles (born 1939)

Archbishop of Canterbury
The Cross of Canterbury

borne by the Reverend John S. Long (1913–2008)

Archbishop of Canterbury

The Most Reverend and Right Honourable Geoffrey Francis Fisher (1887–1972)

attended by the Reverend Eric G. Jay (1907–1989) and the Reverend Canon Ian Hugh White-Thomson (1905–1997)

== Duke of Edinburgh ==
Heralds
Arundel Herald Extraordinary Dermot Michael Macgregor Morrah (1896–1974)		Norfolk Herald Extraordinary H. S. London (1884–1959)
Somerset Herald Michael Roger Trappes-Lomax (1900–1972)	Lord Lyon King of Arms Sir Thomas Innes of Learney KCVO (1893–1971)	Windsor Herald Richard Preston Graham-Vivian MC (1896–1979)
The Duke of Edinburgh and His Household
Harbinger of the Gentlemen at Arms Major-General Arthur Reginald Chater CB OBE DSO (1896–1979) Three Gentlemen-at-Arms	The Queen's Consort Admiral of the Fleet HRH THE DUKE OF EDINBURGH KG KT GBE (1921–2021) his coronet carried by his page Nigel Grier-Rees, Midshipman RN (died 1973)	The Standard Bearer of the Gentleman at Arms Major-General Maurice Anthony Wingfield CMG DSO (1883–1956) Three Gentlemen-at-Arms
The Equerry to the Duke of Edinburgh Squadron-Leader Sir Beresford Peter Torrington Horsley AFC (1921–2001)	The Treasurer to the Duke of Edinburgh Lieutenant-General Sir Frederick Arthur Montague Browning KBE CB DSO (1896–1965)	The Private Secretary to the Duke of Edinburgh Lieut.-Commander John Michael Avison Parker MVO RN (1920–2002)
Serjeants-at-Arms
Serjeant-at-Arms Lieut.-Commander (S) Albert W. Stone MVO MSM RN		Serjeant-at-Arms George A. Titman, CBE MVO (1889–1980)
Heralds
Richmond Herald Anthony R. Wagner (1908–1995)		York Herald Aubrey John Toppin, MVO (1881–1969)
Chester Herald John Dunamace Heaton-Armstrong, MVO (1888–1967)		Lancaster Herald Archibald George Blomefield Russell, CVO (1879–1955)

== Bearers of the Regalia and Great Officers of State ==
Regalia
Saint Edward's Staff borne by The Earl of Ancaster TD (1907–1983), his coronet carried by his page, George John Aird (1940-2023)		The Sceptre with the Cross borne by Marshal of the Royal Air Force The Viscount Portal of Hungerford KG GCB OM DSO MC (1893–1971), his coronet carried by his page, Winston Spencer-Churchill (1940–2010)
a Golden Spur borne by The Lord Churston (1910–1991), his coronet carried by his page, The Honourable William Grosvenor (born 1942)		a Golden Spur borne by The Lord Hastings (1882–1956), his coronet carried by his page, Philip Gurdon (born 1940)
The Sword of Temporal Justice, or Third Sword borne by The Duke of Buccleuch and Queensberry KT GCVO (1894–1973), his coronet carried by his page, Charles John Dawnay (born 1938)	Curtana borne by The Duke of Northumberland (1914–1988), his coronet carried by his page, Edward Elwes	The Sword of Spiritual Justice, or Second Sword borne by The Earl of Home PC (1903–1995), his coronet carried by his page, Lord Dunglass (1943–2022)
English Kings of Arms, Black Rod and the Lord Mayor of London
Norroy and Ulster King of Arms Sir Gerald Woods Wollaston KCB KCVO (1874–1957)		Clarenceux King of Arms Sir Arthur William Steuart Cochrane KCVO (1872–1954)
The Lord Mayor of London bearing the Crystal Sceptre Sir Rupert de la Bère (1893–1978)	Garter Principal King of Arms Sir George Rothe Bellew CVO (1899–1993)	The Gentleman Usher of the Black Rod Lieutenant-General Sir Brian Gwynne Horrocks KCB KBE DSO MC (1895–1985)
The Great Officers of State and the Sword of State
The Lord Great Chamberlain The Marquess of Cholmondeley (1883–1968) his coronet carried by his page The Viscount Ullswater (born 1942)
The Lord High Steward of Ireland The Earl of Shrewsbury (1914–1980) his coronet carried by his page John Chetwynd-Talbot (born 1941)		The High Constable of Scotland The Lord Kilmarnock MBE (1903–1975) standing proxy for The Countess of Erroll (1926–1978) his coronet carried by his page Robin Jordan Boyd (born 1941)
The Great Steward of Scotland The Earl of Crawford and Balcarres GBE (1900–1975) standing proxy for HRH The Duke of Rothesay and Cornwall (born 1948); his coronet carried by his page, Thomas Richard Lindsay (born 1937)
The Earl Marshal The Duke of Norfolk KG GCVO (1908–1975), attended by his two pages, Duncan Henry Davidson (born 1941) and the Honourable James Reginald Drummond (born 1938)	The Sword of State borne by The Marquess of Salisbury KG (1893–1972) his coronet carried by his page, William Hugh Amherst Cecil (1940–2009)	The Lord High Constable of England Field Marshal The Viscount Alanbrooke KG GCB OM DSO (1883–1963) attended by his two pages, Henry Neville Lindley Keswick (born 1938) and Charles Anthony Selby McCreery (born 1942)
Regalia
Sceptre with the Dove borne by The Duke of Richmond and Gordon (1904–1989) his coronet carried by his page Simon Warley Frederick Benton Jones (1941–2016)	St. Edward's Crown borne by the Lord High Steward; Admiral of the Fleet The Viscount Cunningham of Hyndhope KT GCB OM DSO (1883–1963), attended by his two pages, Julian Alexander Ludovic James (born 1939) and Martin Brett	The Orb borne by Field Marshal The Earl Alexander of Tunis KG GCB CSI DSO MC (1891–1969) his coronet carried by his page The Honourable Brian James Alexander (born 1939)
The Bible and Altar Plate
The Paten borne by the Bishop of London, The Right Reverend John William Charles Wand (1885–1977)	The Bible borne by the Bishop of Norwich, The Right Reverend Percy Mark Herbert (1885–1968)	The Chalice borne by the Bishop of Winchester, The Right Reverend Alwyn Terrell Petre Williams (1888–1968)

== The Queen ==
The Queen and Her Attendants
The Clerk of the Cheque and Adjutant Lieutenant-Colonel The Honourable Osbert Vesey CMG CBE (1884–1957)
The Bishop of Bath and Wells The Right Reverend Harold William Bradfield (1898–1960)	HER MAJESTY THE QUEEN (1926–2022) in Her Royal Robe of crimson Velvet, trimmed with Ermine and bordered with Gold Lace; Wearing the Collar of the Garter; on Her Head a Diadem of precious Stones	The Bishop of Durham The Right Reverend Arthur Michael Ramsey (1904–1988)
The Lieutenant of the Gentlemen-at-Arms Brigadier General Sir Harvey Kearsley KCVO CMG DSO (1880–1956)
Ten Gentlemen-at-Arms		Ten Gentlemen-at-Arms
Her Majesty's Train borne by The Mistress of the Robes The Dowager Duchess of Devonshire (1895–1988) assisted by the Maids of Honour:
Lady Jane Antonia Frances Vane-Tempest-Stewart (born 1932)		Lady Mary Baillie-Hamilton (1934–2022)
Lady Anne Veronica Coke (born 1932)		Lady Nancy Jane Marie Heathcote-Drummond-Willoughby (born 1934)
Lady Moyra Kathleen Hamilton (1930–2020)		Lady Rosemary Mildred Spencer-Churchill (born 1929)
the coronet of the Mistress of the Robes carried by her page, Marquess of Hartington (born 1944)
The Groom of the Robes Captain Sir Harold Campbell KCVO DSO RN (1888–1969)
Ladies of the Bedchamber
The Countess of Euston (1920–2021)		The Countess of Leicester (1912–1985)
Women of the Bedchamber
Lady Alice Egerton (1923–1977)		Lady Margaret Hay (Lady Margaret Katherine Seymour) (1918–1975)
Mrs Alexander Abel Smith (Henriette Alice Cadogan) DCVO (1914–2005)		Mrs Andrew Elphinstone (Jean Frances Hambro) (1923–2017)

Other Members of the Royal Household
The Vice-Admiral of the United Kingdom Admiral Sir Martin Eric Dunbar-Nasmith VC KCB (1883–1965)	The Master of the Horse The Duke of Beaufort KG GCVO (1900–1984) his coronet carried by his page, Reuben Charles Harford	The Gold-Stick-in-Waiting Major-General Sir Richard Granville Hylton Howard-Vyse KCMG DSO (1883–1962)
The Captain General of the Queen's Bodyguard for Scotland (the Royal Company of Archers) and Gold Stick for Scotland The Earl of Stair KT DSO (1879–1961), his coronet carried by his page, Lord Montgomerie (1939–2018)
The Rear-Admiral of the United Kingdom Admiral Sir Percy Lockhart Harnam Noble GBE KCB CVO (1880–1955)
Lord in Waiting The Earl of Eldon KCVO (1899–1976) his coronet carried by his page, Simon Peter Scott (1939–2009)
The Captain of the Queen's Bodyguard of the Yeomen of the Guard The Earl of Onslow MC TD (1913–1971), his coronet carried by his page, Michael John Hare (1938–2018)
The Keeper of Her Majesty's Privy Purse The Lord Tryon KCVO DSO (1906–1976), his coronet carried by his page, The Honourable Anthony Tryon (1940–2018)		The Private Secretary to the Queen Sir Alan Frederick Lascelles GCB GCVO CMG MC (1887–1981)
The Crown Equerry Colonel Sir Dermot McMorrough Kavanagh GCVO (1890–1958)		The Comptroller, Lord Chamberlain's Office Lieutenant-Colonel Sir Terence Nugent GCVO MC (1895–1973)
Equerry to the Queen Group Captain Peter Townsend CVO DSO DFC (1914–1995)		Equerry to the Queen Major Sir Michael Edward Adeane KCVO CB (1910–1984)
Equerry to the Queen Captain Viscount Althorp (1924–1992)		Equerry to the Queen Captain The Lord Plunket (1923–1975), his coronet carried by his page, The Marquess of Dufferin and Ava (1938–1988)
The Field-Officer-in-Brigade Waiting Colonel Thomas Foley Churchill Winnington MBE (1910–1999)		The Silver-Stick-in-Waiting Colonel Edward John Sutton Ward MVO MC (1909–1990)
The Clerk of the Cheque and Adjutant of the Yeomen of the Guard Lieutenant-Colonel Ralph Charles Bingham DSO (1885–1977)		The Lieutenant of the Yeomen of the Guard Sir Allan Henry Shafto Adair Bt CB DSO MC (1897–1988)
Twelve Yeomen of the Queen's Bodyguard of the Yeomen of the Guard
