= List of participants in the coronation processions of George VI =

There were three processions during the coronation of King George VI and Queen Elizabeth. The first saw the King and Queen, members of the royal family, Prime Ministers of the Dominions and the representatives of foreign royalty proceed from Buckingham Palace to Westminster Abbey for the ceremony. Once in the Abbey, the second procession was an element of the ceremony in which court, clerical, governmental, and parliamentary officials from around the Commonwealth of Nations moved in a set order of precedence through the nave and choir and to their seats. After the Coronation, the King and Queen proceeded for the third and last time that day around London's streets as part of a large military parade. The lists below outline the processions forming part of the Coronation of King George VI.

== Procession to the abbey ==
Participants	Ref.
Members of the royal family
Lord Carnegie KCVO and Lady Carnegie	
The Marquess of Carisbrooke GCB GCVO and the Marchioness of Carisbrooke	
Earl of Macduff	
Captain Marquess of Milford Haven GCVO and the Marchioness of Milford Haven	
Lady Tatiana Mountbatten	
The Marquess of Cambridge GCVO and the Marchioness of Cambridge	
Lord Frederick Cambridge and Lady Mary Cambridge	
Lady Helena Gibbs and the Duchess of Beaufort	
Major Henry Abel Smith and Lady May Abel Smith	
Miss Patricia Mountbatten and Lady Louis Mountbatten	
Foreign representatives
Prince Chichibu GCVO and Princess Chichibu	
The Count of Flanders GCVO	
Princess Juliana of the Netherlands and Prince Bernhard of the Netherlands	
The Crown Prince of Norway GCVO and the Crown Princess of Norway	
The Crown Prince of Sweden GCB GCVO and the Crown Princess of Sweden	
The Crown Prince of Denmark GCVO and the Crown Princess of Denmark	
The Prince Regent of Yugoslavia GCVO and Princess Paul of Yugoslavia	
The Grand Voevod of Alba Julia	
The Crown Prince of Saudi Arabia GBE	
The Prince of Preslav	
The Crown Prince of Greece GCVO	
Prince Muhammad Abdel Moneim	
Raul Régis de Oliveira GBE	
Dr. Tomás Le Breton	
Conte Grandi	
M. M. Litvinov	
James W. Gerard GCB	
Y. Delbos	
General İsmet İnönü	
Colonel Józef Beck	
Dr. Kung Hsiang-hsi	
Agustín Edwards Mac-Clure GBE	
Julián Besteiro	
Field Marshal Werner von Blomberg	
Armindo Rodrigues de Sttau Monteiro	
Seif Al Islam Hussein	
Sardar Shah Wali Khan	
Prince Chula Chakrabongse	
The Prince of Luxembourg	
Charles R. Paravicini	
Guido Schmidt	
Dr. Milan Hodža CB	
Rudolf Holsti	
Vilhelms Munters	
Alfredo Benavides	
Stasys Lozoraitis	
Constantino Herdocia	
General Johan Laidoner KCMG	
Dejazmatch Makonnen Endelkachew OBE	
Commanding General Sir Kaiser Shumsher Jung Bahadur Rana GBE	
Rafael Paino Pichardo	
General Carlos García Vélez KBE	
Kálmán de Kánya	
Ekrem Bey Libohova	
Dr. Luis Alberto de Herrera GBE	
Dr. Caracciolo Parra Pérez	
Dr. Arnulfo Arias	
Sayid Raouf Al Chadirji	
Dr. Primo Villa Michel	
Antonio Quevedo	
Hassan Esfandiari	
Luis Tamayo	
Ernest G. Chauvet	
Dr. José Matos	
Dr. Rogelio Espinosa	
Carlos Víctor Aramayo	
Luis Fernández	
Tiburcio Carías	
Baron de Lynden	
Comte Henri de Maleville	
Raúl Contreras	
Melvill A. Jamieson	
Prime Ministers and Premiers
Stanley Baldwin, Prime Minister of the United Kingdom, and Mrs Baldwin; Followed by an escort of Metropolitan Mounted Police	
W.L. MacKenzie King, CMG, Prime Minister of Canada; Followed by an escort of Royal Canadian Mounted Police	
J.A. Lyons, CH, Prime Minister of Australia, and Mrs Lyons; Followed by an Australian Mounted Escort	
M.J. Savage, Prime Minister of New Zealand; Followed by a New Zealand Mounted Escort	
General J.B.M. Hertzog, Prime Minister of South Africa; Followed by a South African Mounted Escort	
Sir Muhammad Zafarullah Khan (representing India) and Dr. Ba Maw (representing Burma); Followed by an escort of Indian Cavalry	
G.M. Huggins, FRCS, Prime Minister of Southern Rhodesia and Lady Huggins; Followed by a South Rhodesian Mounted Escort	
The Viscount of Craigavon, Bt, Prime Minister of Northern Ireland, and the Viscountess of Craigavon; Followed by an Escort of Troopers, 5th Royal Inniskilling Dragoon Guards.	
The Amir of Transjordan and the Sultan of Zanzibar; Followed by an Escort of Troopers, 16th/5th Lancers.	
The Sultan of Johore and the Sultan of Terengganu; Followed by an Escort of Troopers, 16th/5th Lancers.	
Yang Di-pertuan Besar of Negri Sembilan and the Sultan of Pahang; Followed by an Escort of Troopers, 16th/5th Lancers.	
Royal Family
1st Division, Captain's Escort	
The Princess Royal; Princess Elizabeth; Princess Margaret; Viscount Lascelles	
The Duchess of Gloucester the Duchess of Kent, Gerald Lascelles	
Major-General Prince Arthur of Connaught KG KT GCMG GCVO CB; Princess Arthur of Connaught; Princess Alice, Countess of Athlone	
2nd Division, Captain's Escort	
Queen Mary
1st Division, Captain's Escort	
Queen Mary and the Queen of Norway	
2nd Division, Captain's Escort, with standard	
State Landau	
THE KING AND QUEEN
Officer of the War Staff	
Four troopers, Life Guards	
Director-General of the TA and his staff officers	
The Officer Commanding the Detachments of Regiments of Yeomanry and Scouts, TA, and his staff officer	
Detachment of above	
Detachment of HAC	
Mounted Band, Royal Artillery	
Officer Commanding Detachment Roy. Art. And his staff officer	
Detachments of Royal Regiment of Artillery	
Band of 16th/5th Lancers	
Officer Commanding Cavalry Detachments and his staff officer	
Representative Detachments from Regiments of Cavalry of the Line	
K Battery, Royal Horse Artillery	
Band of The Royal Scots Greys	
The King's Indian Orderly Officers	
Aides-de-Camp, RAF	
Aides-de-Camp, KHP and KHS, TA	
Aides-de-Camp, KHP and KHS, Regular Army	
Aides-de-Camp, Naval and Marine	
General Officers Commanding-in-Chief and General Officer Commanding Northern Ireland District	
Field Marshals	
War Office Staff	
Air Council - Air Members	
Army Council - Military Members	
Board of Admiralty - Sea Lords	
The King's Escort of Officers form the Dominion Contingents	
The King's Escort of Officers form the Colonial Contingents	
The King's Marshalmen	
The King's Bodyguard of the Yeomen of the Guard	
The King's Bargemaster and Twelve Watermen	
The King's Escort of Indian Army Officers	
Massed Bands of the Household Cavalry	
1st Division, Sovereign's Escort	
2nd Division, Sovereign's Escort	
Honorary Aides-de-Camp to the King	
Chief Staff Officer for the Field Marshal Commanding; Chief Commissioner, Metropolitan Police Force	
Aide-de-Camp to the Chief Staff Officer to Field Marshal in Command of Troops; Aide-de-Camp to Field Marshal in Command of Troops	
The King and Queen; Conveyed in the Gold State Coach; Flanked by the Captain of the Escort and the Field of Officer of the Escort; Pulled by eight grey horses.	
The Standard	
Field Marshal Commanding the Troops (Field Marshal the Earl of Cavan KP GCB GCMG GCVO GBE); The Master of the Horse (the Duke of Beaufort KG GCVO)	
Gold Stick in Waiting (Field Marshal Sir William R. Birdwood Bt GCB GCMG CIE DSO)	
The Field Officer in Brigade Waiting (Colonel G.E.C. Rasch CVO DSO); Silver Stick in Waiting (Lieutenant-Colonel E.J.L. Speed MC)	
Captain the Duke of Kent KG KT GCMG GCVO ADC; Major-General the Duke of Gloucester KG KT KP GCMG GCVO ADC	
Colonel the Earl of Harewood KG GCVO DSO TD ADC; Commander Lord Louis Mountbatten GCVO ADC; Major-General the Earl of Athlone KG GCB GCMG GCVO DSO ADC	
The 3 Principal Aides-de-Camp of the Armed Services	
Equerries in Waiting to the King	
Adjutant in Brigade Waiting; Silver Stick Adjutant	
Staff Officers, London District	
Royal Grooms	
3rd Division, Sovereign's Escort	
Four State carriages	
4th Division, Sovereign's Escort	

== Procession of the King and Queen in the Abbey ==
Office	Person/Title	Ref.
Chaplains
The Abbey Beadle	C. Barnes	
Chaplains	Rev. John Stirton CVO	
Chaplains	Rev. Archibald Main	
Chaplains	Very Rev. Charles L. Warr (Dean of the Chapel Royal, Scotland)	
Chaplains	Very Rev. T. H. Masters CBE	
Chaplains	Rev. Canon C. E. Raven	
Chaplains	Rev. E. K. Talbot MC	
Chaplains	Rev. Canon B. Cunningham OBE	
Chaplains	Rev. F. I. Anderson CMG	
Chaplains	Rev. Canon T. G. Rogers MC	
Chaplains	Rev. Prebendary J. H. J. Ellison MVO	
Domestic Chaplains	Rev. A. R. Fuller MVO	
Domestic Chaplains	Very Rev. Albert V. Baillie KCVO (Dean of Windsor)	
Domestic Chaplains	Rev. Prebendary L. J. Percival KCVO	
Representatives of the Free Churches
Chairman, Congregational Union of England and Wales	Rev. E. J. Price	
Moderator, Presbyterian Church of England	Rt. Rev. James Burns	
President, Baptist Union	H. L. Taylor	
President, Methodist Conference	Rev. C. E. Walters	
President, National Free Church Council	Rev. J. Colville	
Moderator, Federal Council	Rev. M. E. Aubrey	
Representatives of the Church of Scotland
Ex-Moderators, Church of Scotland	Very Rev. Andrew Nisbet Bogle	
Ex-Moderators, Church of Scotland	Very Rev. John White CH	
Moderator, General Assembly	Rt. Rev. Professor Daniel Lamont	
Dean and Prebendaries of Westminster
Prebendaries' Verger	G. Rowling	
Cross of Westminster	Rev. J. Perkins	
Prebendaries of Westminster	Rev. Canon H. Costley-White	
Prebendaries of Westminster	Rev. Canon F. R. Barry DSO	
Prebendaries of Westminster	Ven. Archdeacon F. L. Donaldson	
Prebendaries of Westminster	Rev. Canon V. F. Storr	
Dean's Verger	G. C. Drake	
Dean of Westminster	Very Rev. W. Foxley Norris KCVO	
Officers of Arms
Bluemantle Pursuivant	R. P. Graham-Vivian MC	
Portcullis Pursuivant	A. R. Wagner	
Carrick Pursuivant	Sir Alexander H. Seton Bt	
Falkland Pursuivant	Lt-Col. J. W. B. Paul DSO	
Unicorn Pursuivant	Maj. H. A. B. Lawson	
Officers of the Orders of Knighthood
Gentleman Usher of the Purple Rod	Sir Frederic G. Kenyon GBE KCB	
King of Arms of the Order of the British Empire	Admiral Sir Herbert L. Heath KCB MVO	
Gentleman Usher of the Blue Rod	Admiral A. G. Hotham CB CMG	
Registrar of the Order of St Michael and St George	Sir Harry F. Batterbee KCMG KCVO	
King of Arms of the Order of St Michael and St George	Sir Frank A. Swettenham GCMG CH	
Secretary of the Order of St Michael and St George	Sir John L. Maffey GCMG KCB KCVO CSI CIE	
Chancellor of the Order of St Michael and St George (p. 7047)	The Marquess of Willingdon GCSI GCMG GCIE GBE; His page: John Knatchbull	
Deputy Secretary of the Order of the Bath	Maj. H. H. F. Stockley CVO OBE	
Gentleman Usher of the Scarlet Rod	Air Vice-Marshal C. A. H. Longcroft CB CMG DSO AFC	
Registrar and Secretary of the Order of the Bath	Admiral R. G. A. W. Stapleton-Cotton CB CBE MVO	
Bath King of Arms	Gen. Sir Walter P. Braithwaite GCB	
Gentleman Usher of the Green Rod	Brig.-Gen. Sir Robert G. Gilmour Bt CB CVO DSO	
Chancellor of the Order of the Thistle	The Earl of Mar and Kellie KT; Page: Alistair R. H. Erskine	
Secretary of the Order of the Garter	F. H. Mitchell CVO CBE	
Standards
Albany Herald	T. Innes	
Rothesay Herald	Sir John M. N. MacLeod Bt	
Standard of the Empire of India	Sir Firozkhan Noon	
Standard of the Union of South Africa	C. T. te Water	
Standard of the Dominion of New Zealand	W. J. Jordan	
Standard of the Commonwealth of Australia	S. M. Bruce CH MC	
Standard of the Dominion of Canada	Vincent Massey	
Union Standard	F. S. Dymoke	
Standard of the Principality of Wales	The Earl of Plymouth; Page: Viscount Windsor	
Standards of the Quarterings of the Royal Arms	The Earl of Granard KG GCVO; Page: Donald S. Erskine	
Standards of the Quarterings of the Royal Arms	The Earl of Derby KG GCB GCVO; Page: Hugh Stanley	
Standards of the Quarterings of the Royal Arms	H. J. Scrymgeour-Wedderburn	
The Royal Standard	The Marquess of Cholmondeley; Page: Julian Fane	
Royal Household
Vice-Chamberlain	Maj. Sir George F. Davies	
Treasurer	Sir George Penny Bt	
Comptroller	Col. Sir Lambert Ward Bt DSO	
Keeper of the Jewel House	Admiral Sir Lionel Halsey GCMG GCVO KCIE CB; Acting for Maj.-Gen. Sir George J. Younghusband KCMG KCIE CB	
Rouge Croix Pursuivant	P. W. Kerr	
Rouge Dragon Pursuivant	E. N. Geijer MC	
Four knights of the Garter (Appointed to hold the canopy for anointing)	The Earl Stanhope KG DSO MC; Page: Norton Knatchbull	
Four knights of the Garter (Appointed to hold the canopy for anointing)	The Earl of Lytton KG GCSI GCIE; Page: Matthew Ridley	
Four knights of the Garter (Appointed to hold the canopy for anointing)	The Duke of Abercorn KG KP; Page: Robert I. Kenyon-Slaney	
Four knights of the Garter (Appointed to hold the canopy for anointing)	The Marquess of Londonderry KG MVO; Page: Michael C. Stanley	
Lord Chamberlain of the Household	The Earl of Cromer GCB GCIE GCVO; Page: Viscount Melgund	
Lord Steward of the Household	The Duke of Buccleuch and Queensberry GCVO; Page: David R.M. Stuart	
Prime Ministers
Lord President of the Council	J. Ramsay MacDonald	
Prime Minister of the United Kingdom; First Lord of the Treasury	Stanley Baldwin	
Prime Minister of the Commonwealth of Australia	J. A. Lyons CH	
Prime Minister of the Dominion of Canada	W. L. Mackenzie King CMG	
Prime Minister of the Union of South Africa	Gen. J. B. M. Hertzog	
Prime Minister of the Dominion of New Zealand	M. J. Savage	
Archbishops of Canterbury and York
Cross of York	Rev. H. C. Warner	
Archbishop of York	Most Rev. William Temple; Attendant: Rev. J. de Wolf Perry	
Lord High Chancellor (p. 7049)	The Viscount Hailsham; Purse-bearer: Quintin McGarel Hogg; Page: Peter Billinge	
Cross of Canterbury	Rev. A. C. Don	
Archbishop of Canterbury	Most Rev. Cosmo Gordon Lang; Attendants: Rev. A. Sargent and Rev. L. C. Green-Wilkinson	
The Queen, her regalia and household
Maltravers Herald Extraordinary	Oswald Barron	
York Herald	A. J. Toppin	
Windsor Herald	A. T. Butler MC	
The Ivory Rod	The Earl of Haddington MC; Page: Desmond O'Brien	
The Lord Chamberlain of the Queen's Household	The Earl of Airlie KCVO MC; Page: Lord Ogilvy	
The Sceptre with the Cross	The Duke of Rutland; Page: Lord Roger Manners	
Sergeant at Arms	G. D. Field MVO	
Sergeant at Arms	F.S. Osgood CBE MVO	
Harbinger, Gentlemen-at-Arms	Brig.-Gen. Sir Frederick Gascoigne KCVO CMG DSO	
Clerk of the Cheque and Adjutant, Gentlemen-at-Arms	Brig.-Gen. R. H. Kearsley CMG DSO	
Ten Gentlemen-at-Arms
The Bishop of Blackburn	Rt. Rev. Percy M. Herbert	
The Bishop of St Albans	Rt. Rev. Michael B. Furse	
THE QUEEN; Her train borne by the Mistress of the Robes: the Dowager Duchess of Northumberland; Assisted by: Lady Ursula Manners, Lady Diana Legge, Lady Margaret Cavendish-Bentinck; Lady Elizabeth Percy, Lady Elizabeth Paget and Lady Iris Mountbatten; The Duchess's Page: Lord Geoffrey Percy		
Ladies of the Bedchamber	The Viscountess Halifax	
Ladies of the Bedchamber	The Countess Spencer	
Ladies of the Bedchamber	The Lady Nunburnholme	
Ladies of the Bedchamber	The Viscountess Hambleden	
Women of the Bedchamber (p. 7050)	Lady Katherine Seymour	
Women of the Bedchamber (p. 7050)	Lady Helen Graham DCVO	
Women of the Bedchamber (p. 7050)	Mrs Geoffrey Bowlby CVO	
Women of the Bedchamber (p. 7050)	Lady Hyde	
Private Secretary to the Queen	Capt. R. J. Streatfeild	
Treasurer to the Queen	Rear-Admiral Sir Basil V. Brooke KCVO	
The King
Somerset Herald	George Bellew MVO	
Lancaster Herald	A. G. B. Russell MVO	
St Edward's Staff	The Viscount Halifax KG GCSI GCIE; Page: Henry L. Middleton	
Sceptre with the Cross	The Duke of Somerset DSO OBE	
Golden Spurs	The Lord Churston; Page: David Bethell	
Golden Spurs	The Lord Hastings; Page: Frank S. Skelton	
Third sword	Marshal of the RAF the Viscount Trenchard GCB GCVO DSO; Page: Hugh Trenchard	
Second sword	Field Marshal the Lord Milne GCB GCMG DSO; Page: John C. Armitage	
Curtana	Admiral the Earl of Cork and Orrery GCB GCVO; Page: Viscount Boyle	
Norroy King of Arms	Maj. A. H. S. Howard CVO MC	
Ulster King of Arms	Maj. Sir Nevile R. Wilkinson KCVO	
Clarenceux King of Arms	A. W. S. Cochrane CVO	
Lord Lyon King of Arms	Sir Francis J. Grant KCVO	
Garter Principal King of Arms	Sir Gerald W. Wollaston KCVO	
Gentleman Usher of the Black Rod	Lt-Gen. Sir William P. Pulteney GCVO KCB KCMG DSO	
The Lord Mayor of London	Sir George T. Broadbridge	
The Lord Great Chamberlain	The Earl of Ancaster GCVO; Lord John Manners	
The Lord High Steward of Ireland	The Earl of Shrewsbury; Page: Christopher Talbot	
The High Constable of Scotland	The Earl of Erroll; Alastair Hay	
The Earl Marshal (7051)	The Duke of Norfolk KG; Pages: Martin Fitzalan-Howard; Viscount Morpeth	
The Sword of State	The Marquess of Zetland GCSI GCIE; Page: Brian Beckett	
The Lord High Constable of England	The Marquess of Crewe KG; Pages: Colin Dodds; Euan Graham	
Sceptre with the Dove	The Duke of Richmond; Page: Charles Vyner	
The Orb	The Duke of Sutherland KT; Pages: Peter Ward	
St Edward's Crown	The Marquess of Salisbury KG GCVO CB (Lord High Steward); Pages: John Ormsby-Gore; John Manners	
The Paten	Rt. Rev. Arthur F. Winnington-Ingram KCVO (Bishop of London)	
The Chalice	Rt. Rev. Cyril F. Garbett (Bishop of Winchester)	
The Bible	Rt. Rev. Bertram Pollock KCVO	
The Standard Bearer of the Gentlemen at Arms	Brig.-Gen. Sir Archibald F. Home KCVO	
The Lieutenant of the Gentlemen at Arms	Col. Sir St. John C. Gore CB CVO CBE	
Twenty Gentlemen at Arms		
The Bishop of Bath and Wells	Rt. Rev. St. J. B. Wynne Willson	
The Bishop of Durham	Rt. Rev. H. Hensley Henson	
THE KING; His train borne by: The Earl Haig and The Earl Kitchener; Alexander A.A.D. Ramsay and Viscount Lascelles; George R. Seymour and George E.C. Hardinge; Montague R.V. Eliot and The Lord Herschell; The Earl Jellicoe		
The Groom of the Robes	Commander H. G. Campbell CVO DSO	
The Vice-Admiral of the United Kingdom	Admiral Sir Stanley C. J. Colville GCB GCMG GCVO	
The Master of the Horse	The Duke of Beaufort KG GCVO; Page: Lord Burghersh	
The Gold Stick in Waiting	Field Marshal Sir William R. Birdwood Bt GCB GCSI GCMG CIE DSO	
Captain General of the King's Bodyguard of Scotland; Gold Stick of Scotland	The Lord Elphinstone KT; Page: Charles Cameron	
Lord in Waiting	The Lord Wigram GCB GCVO CSI; Page: Hector Laing	
Captain, Yeomen of the Guard	Col. the Lord Templemore DSO OBE; Page: Peter Strutt	
Captain, Hon. Corps of Gentlemen at Arms	Brig.-Gen. the Earl of Lucan KBE CB; Page: Viscount Althorp	
Keeper of His Majesty's Privy Purse	Maj. Sir Ulick F. C. Alexander KCVO CMG OBE	
Private Secretary to the King	Sir Alexander H. L. Hardinge GCVO KCB MC	
Crown Equerry	Col. Sir Arthur E. Erskine GCVO DSO	
Comptroller, Lord Chamberlain's Office	Lt-Col. T. E. G. Nugent CVO MC	
Groom in Waiting	A. H. Penn	
Equerries to the King	T. W. E. Coke MVO	
Equerries to the King	Lt-Col. Piers W. Legh CMG CIE CVO OBE	
Field Officer in Brigade Waiting	Col. G. E. C. Rasch CVO DSO	
The Silver Stick in Waiting	Lt-Col. E. J. L. Speed MC	
Yeomen of the Guard
Ensign	Lt-Col. G. R. Lascelles CVO OBE	
Lieutenant	Col. Sir Colin W. McRae CVO CBE	
Clerk of the Cheque	Brig.-Gen. R. C. A. McCalmont DSO	
Exon	Maj. Edric A. C. Weld-Forester	
Exon	Lt-Col. E. B. Frederick	
Exon	Lt-Col. W. Gibbs	
Twelve Yeomen of the Guard		

== Procession from the Abbey to Buckingham Palace ==
Participants	Ref.
Officer of the War Office Staff; Col. H.F. Grant-Suttie DSO MC	
Four troopers, Life Guards; Band and Bugles of 1st Battalion, the Rifle Brigade	
Colonial contingent Commanded by Col. C.C. Fawkes MC; Staff officer: Capt. W.M. Harrington OBE MC MM	
Burma contingent Commanded by Lt-Col. H.G. Gauntlett	
Southern Rhodesia contingent Commanded by Lt-Col. E. Lucas-Guest	
Newfoundland contingent	
South Africa contingent Commanded by Col. K.R. Van der Spuy MC; Staff Officer: Capt. H.J. Bronkhorst	
New Zealand contingent Commanded by Maj. N.W. McD. Weir; Staff officer: Capt. L.W. Andrew VC	
Australia contingent Commanded by Gen. Sir Harry G. Chauvel GCMG KCB; Staff officer: Col. E.F. Lind DSO VD; Aide-de-Camp: Maj. R.N.L. Hopkins	
Canadian contingent Commanded by Col. J.E.L. Streight MC VD; Staff Officer: Lt-Col. J.R.S. Lough DSO MC VD	
Band of the RAF	
RAF detachment Commanded by Group-Captain A.H. Jackson; Staff officer: Squadron-Leader A.C. Sanderson DFC; Staff officer: Squadron-Leader A.D.H. Foster	
Indian contingent Commanded by Gen. Sir Henry E. Ap Rhys Pryce KCB CMG ADC; Staff officer: Maj. W.M.C. Wilson; Staff officer: Col. C.O. Harvey CVO CBE MC	
Officer Training Corps detachment Commanded by Col. K.D.B. Murray CB DSO	
Detachments of The King's Own Malta Regiment; The Bermuda Regiment; The Royal Jersey Militia; The Royal Guernsey Militia; The Territorial Army Nursing Service; The Royal Army Chaplains' Department (TA); The Engineer and Railway Staff Corps.	
Band and Pipes, The 1st Battalion The Highland Light Infantry	
The Director-General General of the TA (Gen. Sir Walter M. St. G. Kirke KCB CMG DSO); Staff officer: 2nd Lt. J.N. St. G. Kirke; Staff officer: Maj. E.P.N. Jones MC	
Detachments from the TA units	
Band and Bugles of the 2nd Battalion The Somerset Light Infantry (Prince Albert's)	
Detachments from the Royal Military College and the Royal Military Academy	
Supplementary Reserve Detachment commanded by Col. W.E. Blakey MM	
Detachments from Queen Alexandra's Imperial Military Nursing Service; The Corps and Departments of the Regular Army; The Royal Malta Artillery; The Royal Tank Corps.	
Band and Drums of the 2nd Battalion The Royal Warwickshire Regiment	
Detachments of Regiments of Infantry, Regular Army; Commanded by Col. G. de C. Glover DSO MC; Staff officer: Lt-Col. E.H.W. Backhouse	
Detachments of the Brigade of Guards; Royal Corps of Signals; Royal Engineers	
Detachments of Regiments of Yeomanry and Scouts (TA); Commanded by Col. G.R. Codrington CB DSO OBE TD; Staff officer: Capt. C.F. Keightley	
Detachment of The Honourable Artillery Company	
Mounted Band, Royal Artillery	
Detachment of the Royal Artillery; Commanded by Maj.-Gen. A.P.Y. Langhorne DSO MS; Staff officer: Lt-Col. R.H. Walsh DSO OBE MC	
Band of the 16th/5th Lancers	
Cavalry detachments Commanded by Col. A.I. Macdougall DSO MC; Staff officer: Lt-Col. H.E. Russell	
"K" Battery, Royal Horse Artillery	
Detachments of Royal Navy; Royal Marines (and Band); Royal Naval Reserve; Royal Naval Volunteer Reserve; Commanded by Capt. A.D. Read RN; Staff officer: Lt M.M. Singer RN; Staff officer: Comm. M. Cunningham RN	
Carriages of the Premiers in reverse order to that given above	
Maj-Gen Prince Arthur of Connaught; Princess Arthur of Connaught; Princess Alice, Countess of Athlone	
The Duchess of Gloucester; The Duchess of Kent; Gerald Lascelles	
The Queen of Norway; The Princess Royal; Viscount Lascelles	
1st Division, Captain's Escort	
Queen Mary; Princess Elizabeth; Princess Margaret	
2nd Division, Captain's Escort, with Standard	
Band of the Royal Scots Greys	
The King's Indian Orderly Officers; Officer in Charge: Lt-Col. E.J.P.T. Walker OBE; Orderlies: Risaldar Musaffar Khan and Risaldar Dharam Singh IOM; Risaldar-Major Bahadur Sher Khan and Risaldar-Major Lall Singh MBE	
Aides-de-Camp, RAF; Group-Captain K.P. Par MC DFC; Group-Captain F.L. Robinson DSO MC DFC	
Aides-de-Camp, KHP and KHS (TA); Col. P.H. Mitchiner TD and Col. H.F. Humphreys OBE MC TD; Col. E.C.M. Phillips DSO TD and Col. E.J. King CMG TD ADC; Col. R.W. Burnyeat DSO TD ADC and Col. C.H. Pank CMG DSO TD ADC; Lt-Col. R.W. Randall ADC and Col. B. Abel Smith DSO MC TD ADC; Col. F.H. Ballatine-Dykes DSO OBE ADC and Brig.-Gen. A.C. Lewin CB CMG DSO ADC	
Aides-de-Camp, KHP and KHS (Regular Army); Col. J.M. Weddell FRCS and Col. J. Heatly-Spencer OBE FRCP; Brig. D.G. Johnson VC DSO MC ADC and Col. G.H. Gill CMG DSO ADC; Brig. H.R.L.G. Alexander CSI DSO MC ADC and Col. F.W. Bullock-Marsham DSO MC; Brig. A.K. Main DSO ADC and Col. J.F.R. Hope CBE DSO ADC; Brig. H.C. Maitland-Makgill-Crichton CB CMG DSO ADC and Col. C.R. Gillett DSO ADC	
Aides-de-Camp, Naval and Marine; Brig. A.G.B. Bourne DSO MVO ADC and Capt. E.G. Cavendish OBE ADC; Capt. A.L. Owens RD ADC and Capt. H.W. Goolden ADC; Commodore L.E. Holland ADC	
General Officers Commanding-in-Chief; General Officer Commanding Northern Ireland District	
Field Marshals	
War Office Staff	
Air Council (Air Members)	
Army Council (Military Members)	
Board of Admiralty (Sea Lords)	
King's Escort of Officers from the Colonial and Dominion Contingents	
The King's Marshalmen; The King's Bodyguard; The King's Bargemaster and 12 Watermen; The King's Escort of Indian Army Officers; Massed Bands of the Household Cavalry; 1st Division of the Sovereign's Escort; 2nd Division of the Sovereign's Escort	
Honorary Indian Aides-de-Campe to the King	
Chief Staff Officer for the Field Marshal Commanding; Chief Commissioner, Metropolitan Police Force	
Aide-de-Camp to the Chief Staff Officer to Field Marshal in Command of Troops; Aide-de-Camp to Field Marshal in Command of Troops	
The King and Queen; Conveyed in the Gold State Coach; Flanked by the Captain of the Escort and the Field of Officer of the Escort; Pulled by eight grey horses.	
Field Marshal Commanding the Troops; The Master of the Horse	
Gold Stick in Waiting	
Field Officer in Brigade Waiting; Silver Stick in Waiting	
Capt. the Duke of Kent; Maj-Gen the Duke of Gloucester	
Col. the Earl of Harewood; Comm. Lord Louis Mountbatten; Maj-Gen the Earl of Athlone	
The 3 Principal Aides-de-Camp of the Armed Services	
Equerries in Waiting to the King	
Adjutant in Brigade Waiting; Silver Stick Adjutant	
Staff Officers, London District	
Royal Grooms	
3rd Division, Sovereign's Escort	
4th Division, Sovereign's Escort	
