= Philip Cary (officer of arms) =

British soldier

- Born: 24 September 1895
- Died: 21 June 1968 (aged 72)
- Spouse: Esther Leon (m. 1920)
- Children: 1
- Father: Byron Cary
- Relatives: Lucius Cary (brother); Lucius Cary (nephew)
- Military career
- Allegiance: England
- Rank: Major
- Unit: Grenadier Guards
- Conflicts: World War I

Major Hon Philip Plantagenet Cary, FSA (24 September 1895 – 21 June 1968) was an officer of arms 1913–1932. He was Bluemantle Pursuivant 1919–1923 and York Herald 1923–1932. He was the third son of Byron Cary, 12th Viscount Falkland.

He married 20 March 1920 Esther Mildred Leon (born 16 December 1899), only daughter of Sir George Edward Leon, 2nd Bt., by his first wife Mildred Ethel Jennings, daughter of Louis John Jennings MP, and had a daughter named Mary Philippa (31 March 1922 – 11 November 2014) who had three children by her marriage to Henry Desmond Graham Prittie, 6th Baron Dunalley (1912 – 1992).

Educated Eton College. Fought in the First World War. Major, Grenadier Guards.

Heraldic offices
Preceded by Sir Gerald Wollaston	Bluemantle Pursuivant; 1919 – 1923	Succeeded by Edmund Clarence Richard Armstrong
Preceded by Gordon de Lisle Lee	York Herald; 1923 – 1932	Succeeded by Aubrey Toppin
