= Athill =

- Language: English

Origin
- Language: Middle English
- Origin: atte hill
- Meaning: "(dweller) at the hill"
- Region of origin: British Isles

Other names
- Variant form: Atthill

Athill is an English language toponymic surname from Middle English atte hill meaning "(dweller) at the hill".

Notable people with this name include:

- Charles Athill (1853–1922), officer of arms at the College of Arms in London
- Diana Athill (1917–2019), British literary editor, novelist, and memoirist
