= John Watson (officer of arms) =

English lawyer (fl. 1646–1660)

John Watson (fl. 1646–1660) was an English lawyer, Notary Public and the first Commonwealth Register at the Court of Chivalry and officer of arms at the College of Arms in London. He served as commissary and treasurer to Major Legge and Colonel Washington in the Royalist Army during the English Civil War. During the Commonwealth, Watson became acting Bluemantle Pursuivant at the College of Arms he was later appointed as Bluemantle for life. This appointment was later rescinded when the Monarchy was restored. Watson acted in an official capacity at the funeral of the Earl of Essex.

== Early life ==
He was born at Bengeworth near Evesham, Worcestershire, the son of William Watson and Alice Egioke. He married Anne, the daughter of George Dethick who was the Registrar of the Court of Chivalry. George Dethick was the son of Sir William Dethick.

== Civil War ==
In the Parliament State Papers, there is a reference to John Watson — "Information that he was in arms against Parliament, and four years since, was of the King's party at Evesham.co. Worcestershire, and was commissary and treasurer to Major Legge and Colonel Washington. " The exact nature of the party is unclear though, with the reference possibly being of Robert Legge, Governor of Evesham with Colonel Washington most likely referencing Henry Washington, a loyal Cavalier in the Civil War. Washington was a descendant of Sir William Washington of Northampton which is the same family as George Washington, the first US President. A memorial in Wickhamford Church, Worcester states - "Sacred to the memory of Penelope, daughter of that most distinguished and renowned soldier, Col. Henry Washington."

When Evesham was stormed by Colonel Massey, he secured himself amongst his friends until he found opportunity to escape. Before Evesham was taken, Mr. Pitway, refusing to drink health to the confusion of Parliament, Watson ran at Pitway with sword drawn, and being stopped by a person in the room, he fell down and broke his leg.

The Pitway referred to, was probably Edward Pitway, the Innkeeper of the Red Lion in Evesham [Now the site of the Northwick Arms], and known supporter of the Parliament side in the Civil war. This would explain the dispute with John Watson, a royalist. Pitway was a Capital Burgess of Evesham and later (1648) the Mayor. Many of the Pitway family were tenants of the Dean and Chapter of Worcester Cathedral.

== College of Arms ==
The English Civil War brought Watson to the position of Bluemantle Pursuivant at the College of Arms. Although he was a Royalist, he was chosen by the Parliamentary Government (The Long Parliament of 1646) for this position. He is listed in the documentation of the College of Arms, after the restoration of the Monarchy in which he lost his position, as an 'Intruder' Bluemantle.

He officially assisted at the Funeral of Parliament's Robert Devereux, 3rd Earl of Essex, and marched in the procession carrying the Earl's Helm and Crest. There is a Broadsheet illustration of the Funeral Procession in the British Museum, which shows John carrying the Helm.

Parliament ordered new Tabards for the College of Arms (from Edmund Harrison, embroiderer) which replace the Royal Arms with the new Arms of the Commonwealth (The State) Amongst others, John Watson wore the new Tabard at the Funeral of Henry Ireton (1651). Miscellaneous Grants VIII bought by the College of Heralds from the Tixall Library, 1899, contain copies of grants collected and mostly certified by John Watson. This previously belonged to Peter Le Neve, and Thomas Martin.

== Family ==
Watson's Coat of Arms were Azure, with a fesse ermine between three Suns in splender Proper. Watson was born to William Watson and Alice Egioke. He married Anne Dethick, with whom he had three children. Thomazin Watson was born 14 November 1650, Ann Watson was born 11 November 1650 and James Watson was born 14 May 1656 in London.

Heraldic offices
Preceded by Robert Browne	Bluemantle Pursuivant of Arms; 1646–1660	Succeeded by Robert Chaloner
