= John Walker (officer of arms) =

English officer of arms

John Riddell Bromhead Walker CVO MC (21 June 1913 – 9 September 1984) was a soldier and long-serving English officer of arms at the College of Arms in London.

Following graduation from Royal Military College, Sandhurst, he was commissioned a second lieutenant on 2 February 1933. He was appointed to the British Indian Army and the 1st battalion 11th Sikh Regiment on 4 March 1934. He was promoted to Lieutenant on 2 May 1935. As an Acting Major with the 11th Sikh Regiment, he was awarded the Military Cross in the London Gazette 18 May 1944 for Burma. He was promoted to major on 1 July 1946. He retired on 31 December 1947 and was granted the rank of honorary lieutenant-colonel. In 1949, he was transferred to the reserve list of the York and Lancaster Regiment.

His heraldic career began on 15 October 1947 when he was appointed Rouge Croix Pursuivant of Arms in Ordinary. He held this position until 1954 when he was promoted to the office of Lancaster Herald of Arms in Ordinary to replace Archibald George Blomefield Russell, who had been advanced to the position of Clarenceux King of Arms. In 1968, Walker was advanced to this same office on the death of Sir John Dunamace Heaton-Armstrong. Walker served as Clarenceux for ten years until his retirement in 1978. He died in 1984 and was buried in the Church of St Benet Paul's Wharf, which has been the religious home of the officers of arms since 1555.

== Arms ==
Coat of arms of John Walker
Adopted 1815 Crest On a mural crown encircled by a wreath of laurel an ostrich resting the dexter claw on a grenade fired, all proper. Escutcheon Or ermined sable, on a pile embattled azure a mural crown between two caltraps in pale or. Motto Nil Desperandum

== See also ==
- Heraldry
- Pursuivant
- Herald
- King of Arms

Heraldic offices
Preceded by Philip Kerr	Rouge Croix Pursuivant; 1947 – 1954	Succeeded by Sir Walter Verco
Preceded by Archibald Russell	Lancaster Herald; 1954 – 1968	Succeeded by Sedley Andrus
Preceded by Sir John Heaton-Armstrong	Clarenceux King of Arms; 1968 – 1978	Succeeded by Sir Anthony Wagner
