= Walter Verco =

Sir Walter Verco KCVO

Norroy and Ulster King of Arms
- In office 1971–1980
- Monarch: Elizabeth II
- Preceded by: Richard Graham-Vivian
- Succeeded by: John Brooke-Little

Personal details
- Born: 18 January 1907
- Died: 10 March 2001 (aged 94)

Sir Walter John George Verco KCVO (18 January 1907 – 10 March 2001) was a long-serving officer of arms who served in many capacities at the College of Arms in London.

== Biography ==
Walter John George Verco was born in London on 18 January 1907. He was educated at Tollington Park Central School.

In 1954 he was appointed Rouge Croix Pursuivant of Arms in Ordinary. He was on the Earl Marshal's staff for the funeral of King George VI in 1952, the Queen's coronation in 1953, the funeral of Sir Winston Churchill in 1965 and the Investiture of the Prince of Wales in 1969. He was also appointed Earl Marshal's Secretary in 1961. In 1960, Verco was promoted to Chester Herald of Arms in Ordinary. He was promoted to Norroy and Ulster King of Arms in 1971. He was appointed Surrey Herald Extraordinary in 1980. He retired as Earl Marshal's Secretary, Inspector of RAF and of RAAF Badges and Advisor on Naval Heraldry in 1996, and died 10 March 2001 in Chichester.

Verco was Honorary Genealogist to the Royal Victorian Order from 1968 to 1988 and Secretary to the Order of the Garter from 1974 to 1988.

== Honours and appointments ==
Verco was appointed a member of the Royal Victorian Order in 1952. He was advanced to the degree of Commander of the same Order in 1970, and was made a Knight Commander in 1981.

== Coats of Arms designed by Walter Verco ==
- Mr Anthony Cronk, FSA, FRSA
- City of Ryde, New South Wales, Australia (1963).

== Arms ==
Coat of arms of Walter Verco
Adopted 1954 Crest A Cornish proper the wings elevated and adorned and doubled sable pretty or, Mantling doubled or. Escutcheon Per pale argent and azure, eleven molets of six points countercharged. Motto Vitam Impendere Vero Symbolism The 11 stars represents the constellation Virgo. The crest is in allusion to the arms of Bellew.

== See also ==
- Herald
- The Heraldry Society
- Officer of Arms

Heraldic offices
Preceded by John Walker	Rouge Croix Pursuivant; 1954 – 1960	Succeeded by Rodney Dennys
Preceded by James Frere	Chester Herald; 1960 – 1971	Succeeded by Hubert Chesshyre
Preceded by Richard Graham-Vivian	Norroy and Ulster King of Arms; 1971 – 1980	Succeeded by John Brooke-Little
Honorary titles
Preceded by The Lord Sinclair	Honorary Genealogist to the Royal Victorian Order; 1968 – 1988	Succeeded by Hubert Chesshyre
Preceded by Sir George Bellew	Secretary of the Order of the Garter; 1974 – 1988	Succeeded by Hubert Chesshyre
