= James Frere =

English herald (1920-1994)

James Arnold Frere FSA
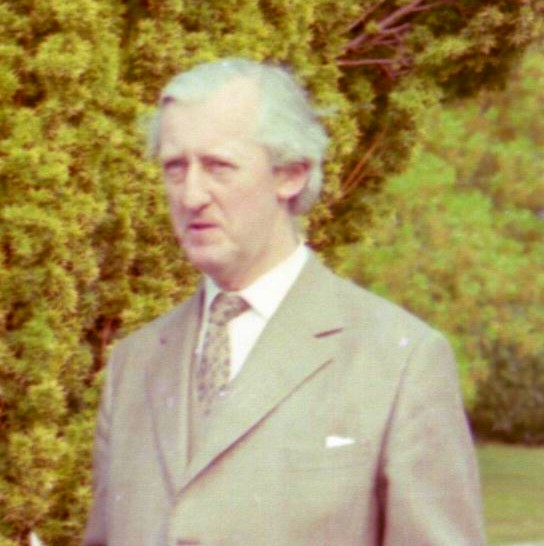
- Born: 20 April 1920
- Died: 26 November 1994 (aged 74)
- Occupation: Herald
- Parents: John Geoffrey Frere (father); Violet Ivy Sparks (mother)
- Military career
- Allegiance: United Kingdom
- Branch: British Army
- Unit: Intelligence Corps

James Arnold Frere FSA (20 April 1920 – 26 November 1994) was an English herald who was officer of arms at the College of Arms in London.

== Biography ==
He was the only son of John Geoffrey Frere of Hartley and Violet Ivy Sparks. Following military service in the Intelligence Corps, he began his heraldic career on 24 February 1948 when he was appointed Bluemantle Pursuivant of Arms in Ordinary. Interested in costume, he took part in the ceremonies for the funeral of King George VI and the coronation of Queen Elizabeth II. He held this post until his appointment as Chester Herald of Arms in Ordinary on 23 January 1956 to replace John Heaton-Armstrong. Frere would hold this post until his retirement in 1960 to work in the Law Courts in the Strand. He was author of The British Monarchy at Home (1963) and co-author with the Duchess of Bedford of Now...the Duchess (1964). He inherited a coat of arms from his father. The blazon was Or two Leopards Faces in pale between Flaunches Gules.

== Arms ==
Coat of arms of James Arnold Frere
Adopted 1948 Crest Out of a ducal coronet gules an heraldic antelope's head argent, armed, crined & tufted gules. Escutcheon Or, 2 leopard's faces between 2 flanches gules. Motto Traditum Ab Antiquis Servare. Frère Ayme Frère. Badge Badge granted 1948: On a mount vert an heraldic antelope lodged argent, armed, crined, tufted & unguled & gorged with a 'ducal' coronet therefrom a chain over the back gules.

== See also ==
- Heraldry
- Pursuivant
- Herald

Heraldic offices
Preceded by Richard Graham-Vivian	Bluemantle Pursuivant; 1948 – 1956	Succeeded by John Brooke-Little
Preceded by Sir John Heaton-Armstrong	Chester Herald; 1956 – 1960	Succeeded by Sir Walter Verco
