= Thomas Joseph-Watkin =

Thomas Morgan Joseph-Watkin (1856–1915) was a barrister and long-serving officer of arms at the College of Arms in London. Born Thomas-Morgan Joseph in Aberdare in 1856, he spent much of the 1880s as a cowboy in Texas. Returning to England in 1887, he began his career at the College of Arms as Portcullis Pursuivant of Arms in Ordinary in April 1894, and later that year added a paternal surname Watkin by Royal Licence. On 20 June 1913, Joseph-Watkin was appointed Chester Herald of Arms in Ordinary to replace Henry Murray Lane. This appointment lasted until Joseph-Watkin's death on 31 July 1915.

== See also ==
- Heraldry
- Pursuivant
- Herald
