= Gerald Wollaston =

English officer of arms (1874–1957)

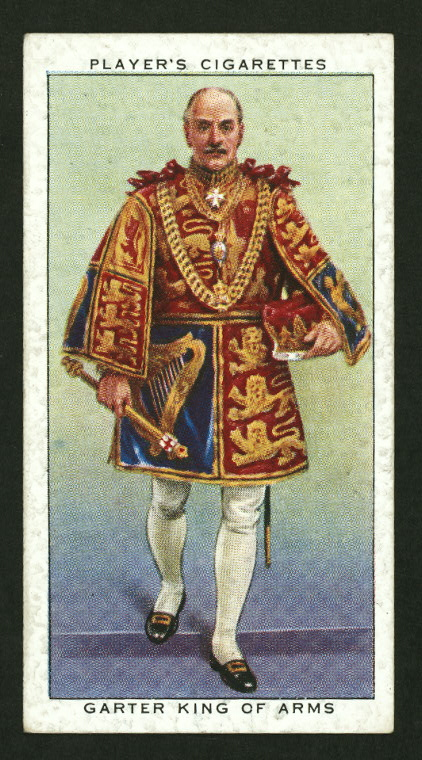
Sir Gerald Wollaston as Garter King of Arms at the coronation of George VI in 1937.

Sir Gerald Woods Wollaston KCB KCVO (2 June 1874 – 4 March 1957) was a long-serving English officer of arms at the College of Arms in London. Wollaston's family had a firm tradition at the College of Arms. Wollaston's great-grandfather was Sir William Woods, Garter Principal King of Arms from 1838 until his death in 1842. His grandfather was Sir Albert William Woods who held the same post from 1869 to 1904.

Wollaston was born at his grandfather's home at 69 St George's Road, Warwick Square, London on 2 June 1874 and baptised at St Benet's, Paul's Wharf on 12 July. He attended Harrow School and Trinity College, Cambridge. He was a student of the Inner Temple from 22 June 1895 and was called to the Bar on 26 January 1899.

Wollaston's first heraldic post came in 1902 with his appointment as Fitzalan Pursuivant of Arms Extraordinary. This appointment came on the coronation of King Edward VII and Queen Alexandra in that year. He held this post until becoming a member of the College chapter on 11 January 1906 as Bluemantle Pursuivant of Arms in Ordinary.

On 26 February 1919, Wollaston was promoted to the office of Richmond Herald of Arms in Ordinary. He remained a herald in ordinary until 1929, when he was appointed Norroy King of Arms. He became Garter Principal King of Arms in 1930 to replace Henry Burke.

He was appointed a Knight Commander of the Royal Victorian Order in the 1935 New Year Honours and a Knight Commander of the Order of the Bath in the 1937 Coronation Honours. Wollaston retired from the post of Garter in 1944 to become the second Norroy and Ulster King of Arms and served as such until his death in 1957.

== Arms ==
Coat of arms of Gerald Wollaston
Adopted 1610 Crest On a wreath of the colours out of a mural crown or a demi-griffin argent holding a pierced mullet sable. Escutcheon Argent, 3 pierced mullets sable. Motto Ne quid falsi ("Neither false") Orders the circlet of the Royal Victorian Order as KCVO

== See also ==
- Pursuivant
- King of Arms

Heraldic offices
Preceded by Gordon Ambrose de Lisle Lee	Bluemantle Pursuivant; 1906 – 1919	Succeeded by Hon. Philip Cary
Preceded by Charles Harold Athill	Richmond Herald; 1919 – 1928	Succeeded by Henry Robert Charles Martin
Preceded by Sir Arthur William Stuart Cochrane	Norroy King of Arms; 1928 – 1930	Succeeded by Sir Algar Henry Stafford Howard
Preceded by Sir Henry Farnham Burke	Garter Principal King of Arms; 1930 – 1944	Succeeded by Sir Algar Henry Stafford Howard
Preceded by Sir Algar Henry Stafford Howard	Norroy and Ulster King of Arms; 1944 – 1957	Succeeded by Aubrey John Toppin
Preceded by Trevor Dawson	Knight Principal of the Imperial Society of Knights Bachelor; 1931-1957	Succeeded by George Bellew
