= John Heaton-Armstrong =

Sir John Dunamace Heaton-Armstrong MVO (21 February 1888 – 27 August 1967) was a long-serving English officer of arms at the College of Arms in London.

== Early life and education ==
Heaton-Armstrong was born at Salisbury House, Edmonton, the son of the Austrian-born politician and businessman William Heaton-Armstrong and his wife, Baroness Bertha Adalberta Maximiliana Zois-Edelstein, who came from an ennobled Habsburg family. She was the granddaughter of Karl von Zois, whose brother was Sigmund Zois. Heaton-Armstrong was educated at Eton College and Trinity Hall, Cambridge.

== Military service ==
During the First World War, Heaton-Armstrong was commissioned into the Cavalry Branch of the Reserve of Officers of the British Indian Army as a second lieutenant, and was later promoted to lieutenant.

His first heraldic appointment at the College came on 6 April 1922, when he was made Rouge Dragon Pursuivant of Arms in Ordinary. On 14 October 1926, Heaton-Armstrong was promoted to the position of Chester Herald of Arms in Ordinary. This office was made vacant by the promotion of Arthur Cochrane to the office of Norroy King of Arms. He was made a Member of the Royal Victorian Order (fourth class) (MVO) in 1937.

While holding this post, Heaton-Armstrong took a leave from the College of Arms to fight in World War II. During this conflict, he rose to the rank of squadron leader in the Administrative and Special Duties Branch of the Royal Air Force. He relinquished his commission in 1944, and returned to the College of Arms, and was knighted in the Coronation Honours of 1953.

== Service as Clarenceux King of Arms ==
In 1956, with the death of Archibald George Blomefield Russel, Heaton-Armstrong was promoted to the office of Clarenceux King of Arms. As such, he was responsible for the granting of arms in his jurisdiction south of the River Trent. While Chester Herald, Heaton-Armstrong was appointed to the honorary post of Inspector of Royal Air Force Badges, which post he held for the rest of his life. Heaton-Armstrong continued to serve as Clarenceux until his own death in late 1967.

== Arms ==
Coat of arms of John Heaton-Armstrong
Crest (1) For Armstrong: A dexter arm in armour, the hand grasping an armed leg couped at the thigh and bleeding, all proper; (2) for Heaton: A lion crowned, plain collared and chained, all proper. Escutcheon Quarterly, (1 & 4) gules, 3 dexter arms embowed in armour argent, the hands closed proper (Armstrong); (2 & 3) vert, a lion argent (Heaton). Motto Vi Et Armis Badge Badge granted 1940: A dexter arm embowed in armour argent enfiled with an astral crown or, the hand proper grasping a sword fessways gules hilted gold.

== See also ==
- Pursuivant
- Herald

Heraldic offices
Preceded by Alexander Mitton	Rouge Dragon Pursuivant; 1922 – 1926	Succeeded by Eric Geijer
Preceded by Sir Arthur Cochrane	Chester Herald; 1926 – 1956	Succeeded by James Frere
Preceded by Archibald Russell	Clarenceux King of Arms; 1956 – 1967	Succeeded by John Walker
