= William Ryley =

Officer of arms (c.1610–1667)

William Ryley (c. 1610 – July 1667) was an officer of arms at the College of Arms in London.

He began his career as a clerk at the record office in the Tower of London under Sir John Borough, Garter king of arms. He entered the College of Arms as Rouge Rose pursuivant in 1630 and was promoted to Bluemantle pursuivant in 1633. As Bluemantle he was involved in the visitations of Buckinghamshire and Oxfordshire in 1634. In 1638, he was admitted to Lincoln's Inn and he was appointed Lancaster herald in 1641. He accompanied Charles I to Oxford in 1641, but was sent back to London to look after the records. In 1646, he was promoted to Norroy king of arms by Parliament, so he could marshal the state funeral of the Earl of Essex. In 1659, he was appointed Clarenceux king of arms, but was demoted at the Restoration to his pre-war status of Lancaster herald. When William Prynne was appointed keeper of the records, Ryley and his son William (d. 1675) were named as deputies. He died in July 1667 and was buried at Westminster Abbey.
