= Henry Spencer Stephenson =

British chaplain (1871–1957)

The Reverend Canon Henry Spencer Stephenson
- Born: 4 November 1871; Mahabaleshwar, India
- Died: 4 June 1957 (aged 85); Newcastle upon Tyne, England
- Education: Sherborne School
- Alma mater: Trinity College, Cambridge
- Parent(s): Sussex Vane Stephenson and Augusta Melita Spencer
- Church: Church of England
- Ordained: 1896

Henry Spencer Stephenson (4 November 1871 – 4 June 1957) was a British Anglican clergyman and a member of the Spencer family. He served as chaplain to King George VI and Queen Elizabeth II, participating in the coronation procession of Queen Elizabeth.

== Personal life and ordained ministry ==
Henry Spencer Stephenson was born on 4 November 1871 in Mahabaleshwar, India, during the British Raj. He was the son of Lieut. Col. Sussex Vane Stephenson of the Scots Fusilier Guards and his wife, Augusta Melita Spencer. His father died of cholera in Bombay, India, on 28 June 1872. In 1882 Stephenson's mother married the Reverend Edward Mallet Young, but there were no children from this marriage, leaving Stephenson an only child.

Stephenson was educated at the leading public school Sherborne, where his step-father was headmaster, and subsequently studied at Trinity College, Cambridge, where he received his BA degree in 1893, promoted to an MA degree in 1897. He was ordained a deacon in 1895 and a priest in 1896.

Stephenson's first religious appointment was as Curate of Willington, Durham, from 1895 to 1900. His next assignment was as Rector of Allendale, Northumberland, in 1900, serving there until 1909. He then moved to Gateshead to serve as Vicar of Christ Church from 1909 to 1914, then becoming Rector of Gateshead in 1914. Stephenson was a commissioner of Boy Scouts and chairman of his diocesan branch of the Church of England Temperance Society. For his religious service, he was made an honorary Canon of Durham in 1922 and a Freeman of Gateshead in 1946.

Stephenson died in hospital in north-east England on 4 June 1957.

== Chaplain to two British monarchs ==
Stephenson was appointed Chaplain to King George on 30 September 1938, replacing Canon Harold Costley-White, DD, who resigned. After King George's death, he continued to serve as Chaplain to Queen Elizabeth, participating as Chaplain during her coronation in 1953.

== Family connections ==
Through his mother, Stephenson was connected to the Spencer family of England and the Smalls of Dirnanean of Perthshire, Scotland. His maternal grandfather was General Sir Augustus Spencer, third son of Francis Spencer, 1st Baron Churchill, and Commander-in-Chief of the Bombay Army between 1869 and 1875. Stephenson's father had been serving as his father-in-law's military secretary at the time of his death.

A maternal great-grandfather was Perthshire native General Sir Archibald Campbell. commander of British forces in the First Anglo-Burmese War and later administrator of the colony of New Brunswick, Canada.
