= Arthur Cochrane (officer of arms) =

The coat of arms of Clarenceux King of Arms.

Sir Arthur William Steuart Cochrane KCVO (27 April 1872 – 11 January 1954) was a long-serving Officer of Arms at the College of Arms in London.

== Biography ==
Arthur Cochrane was the third son of Rev. David Crawford Cochrane, Master of Etwall Hospital (almshouses), and his wife Jane Tomlinson. He was born at Etwall Lodge and educated at Repton School. After serving for a term as secretary to Sir Alfred Scott-Gatty, Garter King of Arms, his heraldic career began on 19 July 1904 when he was appointed Rouge Croix Pursuivant of Arms in Ordinary. Cochrane took part in the coronation of King George V and was made MVO in 1911. In 1915, he was promoted to the office of Chester Herald of Arms in Ordinary. He held this office until 1926 when he was promoted to Norroy King of Arms. Two years later, on the death of Gordon Ambrose de Lisle Lee, Cochrane was chosen to succeed him as Clarenceux King of Arms on 26 July 1928. Cochrane was made CVO in 1931, and in 1934, he was appointed Advisor on Naval Badges in succession to Major Foulkes, its originator. Commander P K Kemp, naval archivist and a fellow member of the committee wrote in The Times, "Meetings of the Ships Badges Committee with Sir Arthur present were always a delight, for his sense of humour was keen and contagious and his deep and intimate knowledge of heraldic matters was always freely at the disposal of those of us on the committee who fancied themselves as amateur kings of arms." Since then, the post has been held by an officer of the College of Arms. Cochrane took part in the coronation of King George VI in 1937 and was knighted that year. He also took part in the coronation of Queen Elizabeth II in 1953 and held the office of Clarenceux until he died in 1954.

Cochrane had many interests apart from heraldry. For nearly 30 years, he served on the Court of the New England Company—a charity originally set up by Oliver Cromwell to evangelise the native inhabitants of North America. He was Governor of the company from 1938 and never missed a meeting. His primary active sport was shooting, but he took a lifelong interest in cricket and followed most other games with devotion. For many years, he was a member of the MCC and a well-known figure in the pavilion at Lords. He was devoted to his old school and was president of the Reptonian Society. From 1950, Cochrane also served as the first Patron of the Cambridge University Heraldic and Genealogical Society. Andrew Noble described him as "a man of great charm and an engaging companion with an encyclopaedic knowledge of pedigrees." He was a tall, distinguished figure, and his leonine head made him easily recognisable on State occasions

Cochrane married Margaret Peregrina Ilbert (1882–1952), the fourth daughter of Sir Courtenay Ilbert, clerk to the House of Commons at St Margaret's Westminster on 15 May 1907. They had six children, but his son David disappeared while walking in Greece in 1931, and a daughter, Myrtilla, died in 1933. A second son, Francis, died of wounds received in action at El Alamein in 1942. His surviving daughters were married to Sir John Winnifrith (permanent secretary at the Ministry of Agriculture) and Alec Peterson (a pioneer in international education). Cochrane was the brother of Alfred Cochrane, cricketer and author, and Charles Walter Hamilton Cochrane of the Federated Malay States service.

== Arms ==
Coat of arms of Arthur Cochrane
| Adopted 25 November 1925 Crest A horse passant argent with a gold crown about its neck. Escutcheon Per pale or & gules, 2 crosses trefly dimidiated & issuing from the dexter & sinister flanks counterchanged. Motto Virtute et Labore |

== See also ==
- College of Arms

Heraldic offices
| Preceded by George William Marshall | Rouge Croix Pursuivant; 1904–1915 | Succeeded by Archibald Russell |
| Preceded by Thomas Joseph-Watkin | Chester Herald; 1915–1926 | Succeeded by Sir John Heaton-Armstrong |
| Preceded by Gordon Lee | Norroy King of Arms; 1926–1928 | Succeeded by Sir Gerald Wollaston |
| Preceded by Gordon Lee | Clarenceux King of Arms; 1928–1954 | Succeeded by Archibald Russell |
| Preceded by Major Foulkes | Advisor on Naval Badges; 1934–1954 | Succeeded by Michael Trappes-Lomax |
