= Henry Lane (officer of arms) =

Henry Murray Lane (3 March 1833 – 24 May 1913) was an officer of arms at the College of Arms in London.

== Personal life ==
He was born in Leamington, Warwickshire, the sixth son of Rev. Charles Lane and Frances Catherine Sandford Lane. Through his father, he was a descendant of the Lane family of Bentley Hall (later of Kings Bromley) one of whom was Jane Lane, the English Civil War heroine. His mother was a daughter of the Right Rev. Dr. Daniel Sandford, DD, Bishop of Edinburgh from 1806 until 1830.

== Heraldic career ==

He was appointed Bluemantle Pursuivant of Arms in Ordinary on 11 August 1849 at the age of 15, and promoted to the rank of Chester Herald of Arms in Ordinary on 18 July 1864. He was Registrar of the College of Arms from 1880 to 1887 and secretary to Garter Mission to the Court of St. Petersburg in 1867.

== Bluemantle's Cricket Club ==

In 1862 he formed the Bluemantle's Cricket Club in Royal Tunbridge Wells. Queen Victoria granted permission for the club to be named after his heraldic title and for it to use his mantle and heraldic colours as its symbols. The club still plays to this day at the Nevill Ground.
