= Charles Athill =

Charles Harold Athill, MVO, FSA (1853–1922) was a long-serving officer of arms at the College of Arms in London.

== Life ==
He began his heraldic career by joining the College of Arms in 1882 as Bluemantle Pursuivant of Arms in Ordinary. The position lasted until 1889, when he was appointed Richmond Herald of Arms in Ordinary. On 23 January 1919, Athill was made Norroy King of Arms to when Sir Henry Farnham Burke was promoted from that position to Garter Principal King of Arms. Later that year, Athill was promoted to the office of Clarenceux King of Arms on the death Sir William Weldon. Athill held this office until his own death in 1922.

== Arms ==
Coat of arms of Charles Athill
Adopted 1919 Crest Out of a coronet of a king of arms proper 3 ostrich feathers argent. Escutcheon Argent, on a chevron cotised sable 3 crescents or. Motto Crescam ut Prosim Previous versions (1) As Bluemantle: Argent, on a chevron sable 3 crescents or. Crest: From a crown 3 ostrich feathers. (2) As Richmond, granted 1891: Argent, on a chevron double cotised sable 3 crescents or. Crest: From a torse 3 ostrich feathers argent stuck through 3 annulets or interlaced in fess.

== See also ==
- Herald
- King of Arms
- Pursuivant
