= Chester Herald =

Officer of the College of Arms

- The heraldic badge of Chester Herald of Arms in Ordinary
- Heraldic tradition: Gallo-British
- Jurisdiction: England, Wales and Northern Ireland
- Governing body: College of Arms

Chester Herald of Arms in Ordinary is an officer of arms at the College of Arms in London. The office of Chester Herald dates from the 14th century, and it is reputed that the holder was herald to Edward the Black Prince. In the reign of King Richard II the officer was attached to the Principality of Chester, which was a perquisite of the then Prince of Wales. In the reign of King Henry VIII the title lapsed for a time but, since 1525, the office of Chester has been one of unbroken succession, as a herald in ordinary. The badge of office is taken from the arms of the Earl of Chester and is blazoned as A Garb ensigned of the Royal Crown Or.

The current Chester Herald of Arms is Dominic Ingram.

== Holders of the office ==
| Arms | Name | Date of appointment | Ref |
|---|---|---|---|
| | John (surname unknown) | (1393) | |
| | William Bruges | 1398–1413 | |
| | James Billett | (Henry VI) | |
| | William Tyndale or Tendale | 1443–1447 | |
| | John Tyndale | (1447) | |
| | William Whiting | (Henry VI) | |
| | John Water or Walter | (1455) | |
| | Richard Stanton | (Henry VI/Edward IV) | |
| | Roger Stamford | (Edward IV) | |
| | Roger Bromley. | (1483) | |
| | Thomas Whiting | (1493) | |
| | Randolph Jackson | 1533–1540 | |
| | William Flower | 1540–1561 | |
| | Robert Cooke | 1562–1566 | |
| | John Hart | 1566–1574 | |
| | Edmund Knight | 1574–1592 | |
| | James Thomas | 1592–1603 | |
| | William Penson | 1603–1617 | |
| | Thomas Knight | 1617–1618 | |
| | Henry Chitting | 1618–1637 | |
| | Edward Walker | 1638–1644 | |
| | William Dugdale | 1644–1660 | |
| | Thomas Lee | 1660–1667 | |
| | Thomas May | 1677–1689 | |
| | Charles Mawson | 1689–1721 | |
| | Edward Stibbs | 1721–1739 | |
| | Francis Hutchenson | 1739–1752 | |
| | John Leake | 1752–1790 | |
| | George Leake | 1791–1834 | |
| | Walter Blount | 1834–1859 | |
| | Edward Stephen Dendy | 1859–1864 | |
| | Henry Lane | 1864–1913 | |
| | Thomas Joseph-Watkin | 1913–1915 | |
| | Sir Arthur Cochrane | 1915–1926 | |
| | Sir John Heaton-Armstrong | 1926–1956 | |
| | James Frere | 1956–1960 | |
| | Sir Walter Verco | 1960–1971 | |
| | Hubert Chesshyre | 1978–1995 | |
| | Timothy Duke | 1995–2014 | |
| | Christopher Fletcher-Vane | 2017–2023 | |
| | Dominic Ingram | 2024–present | |

== See also ==
- Heraldry
- Officer of arms
