= Richard Graham-Vivian =

British officer of arms (1896–1979)

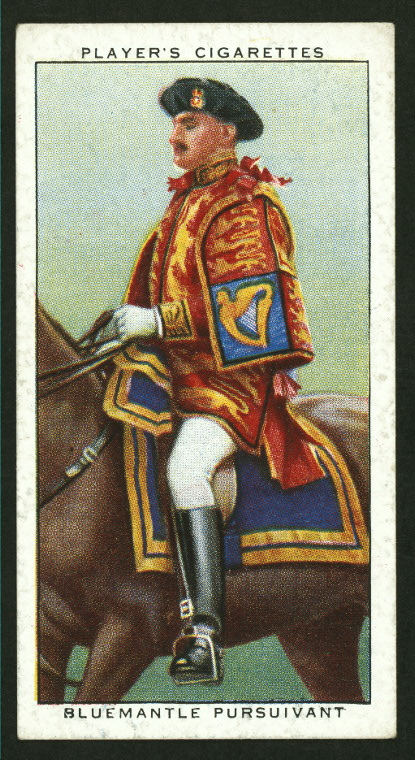
Richard Graham-Vivian as Bluemantle Pursuivant at the coronation of King George VI and Queen Elizabeth in 1937.

Richard Preston Graham-Vivian MVO MC (10 August 1896 – 1979) was a long-serving English officer of arms at the College of Arms in London. He was the younger son of Sir Richard James Graham, 4th Baronet, and Lady Mabel Cynthia Duncombe.

During the First World War he served as an officer in the King's Royal Rifle Corps and was awarded the Military Cross. He relinquished his commission on 17 January 1919. On 7 December 1921, he married Audrey Emily Vivian, who was an only daughter, and the source of the second surname that the couple adopted in 1929 (by Royal Licence).

His heraldic career began in 1933 when he was appointed Bluemantle Pursuivant of Arms in Ordinary at the College of Arms. He held this office until 7 February 1947, other than for a period of leave when he returned to the army during the Second World War. On that date, he was promoted to the office of Windsor Herald of Arms in Ordinary to fill the vacancy left by the death of Alfred Trego Butler. He remained a herald in ordinary until 1966, when he was made Norroy and Ulster King of Arms on the retirement of Aubrey John Toppin. Graham-Vivian would hold this office until his own retirement 1971. He was made an Officer of the Venerable Order of Saint John in 1949.

In the 1961 Queen's Birthday Honours, he was made a Member (fourth class) of the Royal Victorian Order (MVO). He died in 1979.

== Arms ==
Coat of arms of Richard Graham-Vivian
Crest 2 wings addorsed or. Escutcheon Quarterly in a border engrailed azure & with a crescent gules over all; (1 & 4) or, on a chief sable 3 escallops or (Graham); (2 and 3) or, a fess checky azure & argent with a chevron gules in chief (Stuart).

== See also ==
- Pursuivant
- King of Arms

Heraldic offices
Preceded by Aubrey Toppin	Norroy and Ulster King of Arms; 1966-1971	Succeeded by Walter Verco
