= Clarenceux King of Arms =

Officer of the College of Arms

- The arms of office of the Clarenceux King of Arms
- Heraldic tradition: Gallo-British
- Jurisdiction: England and Wales south of the river Trent
- Governing body: College of Arms

Clarenceux King of Arms, historically often spelled Clarencieux (both pronounced /ˈklærənsuː/ KLARR-ən-soo), is an officer of arms at the College of Arms in London. Clarenceux is the senior of the two provincial kings of arms and his jurisdiction is that part of England south of the River Trent. The office almost certainly existed in 1420, and there is a fair degree of probability that there was a Claroncell rex heraldus armorum in 1334. There are also some early references to the southern part of England being termed Surroy, but there is not firm evidence that there was ever a king of arms so called. The title of Clarenceux is supposedly derived from either the Honour (or estates of dominion) of the Clare earls of Gloucester, or from the Dukedom of Clarence (1362). With minor variations, the arms of Clarenceux have, from the late fifteenth century, been blazoned as Argent a Cross on a Chief Gules a Lion passant guardant crowned with an open Crown Or.

The current Clarenceux King of Arms is Robert Noel who was appointed to the office on 28 October 2024.

== Holders of the office ==
Brackets indicate a date for which there is evidence the named person held this office

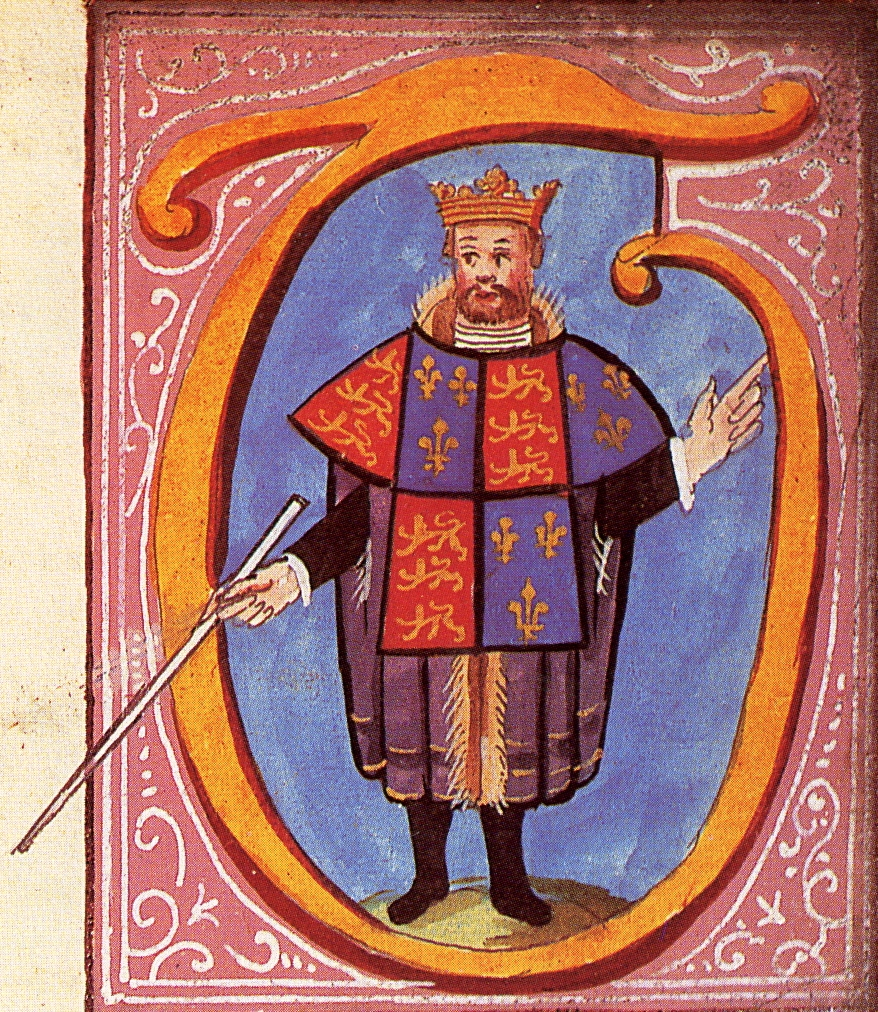
Clarenceux King of Arms Thomas Hawley in a 1556 grant of arms

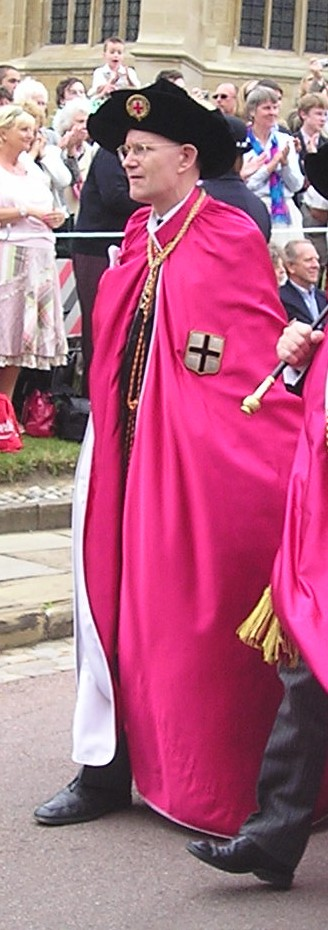
The former Clarenceux King of Arms, Patric Dickinson, on Garter Day, dressed in the robe of the Secretary of the Order of the Garter

Arms	Name	Dates of office (Note: Dates down to 1963 are from Godfrey and Wagner 1963, pp. 75–101. The start date is the date of the Patent instituting them as Garter except where otherwise noted. Appointees died in office unless otherwise stated.)	Notes	Ref
	Andrew	(1334)	This otherwise obscure figure was named as "Clarencell rex Heraldus" in a Wardrobe Account record dated 19 June 1334.	
	Richard Spenser	(1383)	Spenser is recorded as "Heraud Mariscall del Suth" on 16 September 1383. According to Godfrey and Wagner, he was possibly sent to Ireland in 1394, but no other details of his life are known.	
	William Horsley	(1420)	Horseley is recorded in the Chapter minutes at the college, dated 5 January 1420. Later lists of heralds state he was Leopard herald and Ireland King of Arms, while Thomas Lant called him Guyene and Clarenceux in his roll of officers of arms; no contemporary evidence in support of these claims has emerged.	
	John Cosoun	c. 1425 – 6 February 1428	Cousoun was Arundel Herald in 1415 and, according to Godfrey and Wagner, "must have been" in that office in 1413, when an Arundel Herald was sent to Portugal. He served John Mowbray, 2nd Duke of Norfolk as Mowbray Herald from c. 1416. He married one Emma and had at least one son, Richard, living in 1426.	
	Roger Legh or Lygh	8 May 1435 (Note: Date of creation, given in Godfrey and Wagner 1963, p. 76) – c. 1460	Legh was later said to have been Wallingford, Rouge Croix and Chester Pursuivants, but there is no or contradictory evidence for these claims. He was appointed Gloucester Herald by 22 February 1431. As Gloucester he went to France and as Clarenceux he was sent to Scotland and Normandy, before attending Garter missions to Aragon and Poland. He was married to one Margaret and apparently died poor; one of his books was later divided into four parts (the Military Roll, a roll relating to the Aldermen of London, another to the kings of England and the last relating to Parliament) which were divided between the British Museum (MSS. Harl. 4205 and Add. 45133) and the Guildhall Library.	
	William Hawkeslowe	c. 1461 – 1476	Hawkeslowe was said to have held a number of heraldic offices: Wallingford, Bluemantle, Leopard and Guyene King of Arms (possibly Herald), but corroborating evidence is lacking. He was appointed Clarenceux between December 1460 and November 1461, before being sent to Scotland. He left for France in 1475, but drowned in the Spanish seas the following year. Apparently indebted at the time of his death, his widow and children were provided for by Edward IV. A number of grants of arms are known from his tenure, but no other material appears to have survived.	
	Sir Thomas Holme	1 August 1476 – 1493	Although said to have been Falcon pursuivant in the reign of Henry VI, Holme's first heraldic appointments for which any evidence has been found is as Rouge Croix (1457). He was Windsor Herald in 1461 and Norroy King of Arms from 1467. He resigned as Clarenceux on 4 January 1485, but was reappointed by patent on 1 May 1487 and served until his death. He took part in a number of diplomatic missions to Scotland, Burgundy, France, Brittany and Denmark, and was godfather to Thomas Wriothesley, Garter King of Arms.	
	Roger Machado	1494–1510	Diplomat and officer of arms of Portuguese extraction. He was appointed Clarenceux King of Arms on 24 January 1494.	
	Christopher Carlill	4 November 1510 – 1511		
	Thomas Benolt	1511–1534		
	Thomas Tonge	1534–1536	Enamelled plaque of Thomas Tonge inscribed 1554 "The armys of the ryght worshepful Maister Tonge otherwyse called Maister Clarencivs and mesteris Susan hys wyfe" A gilt copper plaque displaying in champlevé enamel the arms of Tonge (Azure, a bend cotised between six martlets) impaling White (Or, a chevron gules between three popinjays vert armed and langued gules within a bordure azure bezanty), dated 1554, survives in the collection of the Victoria and Albert Museum, London. It is similar to Stall plates of Knights of the Garter used to denote seats reserved for the knights in St George's Chapel, Windsor Castle. The whole is enclosed within a wreath. A motto in French is inscribed along the top: ESPOER EN DIEU (Hope in God) and an inscription in English beneath: The armys of the ryght worshepful Maister Tonge otherwyse called Maister Clarencivs and mesteris Susan hys wyfe. Thomas Tonge held the offices of York Herald and Norroy King of Arms. In 1534 he was created Clarenceaux King of Arms. He died in 1536 and was buried in the Church of St. Mary Overy in Southwark, now Southwark Cathedral. His wife was Susanna White, a daughter of Richard White of Hutton, Essex. She survived her husband by nearly 30 years and was the First Lady of the Privy Chamber to Queen Mary.	
	Thomas Hawley	1536–1557		
	William Harvey	1557–1567		
	Robert Cooke	1567–1594		
	Richard Lee	1594–1597		
	William Camden	1597–1623		
	Sir Richard St George	1623–1635		
	Sir William Le Neve	1635–1646		
	Arthur Squibb	1646–1650		
	Sir Edward Bysshe	12 June 1650 – 1658 (resigned)	The eldest son of a Surrey gentleman, Bysshe was a Member of Parliament for Bletchingly, Reigate and Gatton. He was a Parliamentarian who took the covenant, intruded in Garter's office (c. 1643) and served on committees to regulate the heralds in 1641 and 1645. Parliament confirmed him as Garter on 20 October 1646 and as Clarenceux in 1650. Although he resigned from the latter eight years later, he was re-appointed in 1661, shortly after he was deposed as Garter during the Restoration. According to Godfrey and Wagner, he was a good armourist; however, his visitations provide only brief accounts of the families concerned, and he neglected his duties, both parliamentary and heraldic, from the 1660s. Despite these failings, he had ensured that the college and its records remained open during the Interregnum, much to the benefit of antiquaries, including his colleague Sir William Dugdale.	
	William Ryley	1658–1661		
	Sir Edward Bysshe	10 March 1661 – 15 December 1679	Reappointment (see above).	
	Sir Henry St George, the younger	28 January 1680 – 16 June 1703 (promoted)	The eighth son of Sir Henry St George, Garter, Henry the younger became Clarenceux King of Arms after appointments as Richmond Herald (1660) and Norroy King of Arms (1677); he succeeded his brother, Sir Thomas, as Garter King of Arms in 1703. He was remembered by contemporaries as "a timorous animal" and "incommunicative, sordid and of little learning", but he visited 12 counties as Clarenceux and donated the profits from six towards the rebuilding of the college after the Great Fire of London. His manuscript collection was sold after his death and later sold again at auction; some have returned to the college, but most remain scattered in collections.	
	Sir John Vanbrugh	1704–1726		
	Knox Ward	1726–1741		
	Stephen Leake	30 November 1741 – 19 December 1754 (promoted)	Leake was born Stephen Martin, the son of a naval officer from Essex; his maternal uncle, Admiral Sir John Leake, left his estate to Martin's parents on the condition that they adopt his surname, which they did in 1721. Despite this and work at the Navy Office, the family lost out in the South Seas crash and Leake was forced to find employment. After joining the Society of Antiquaries of London and publishing Nummi Britannici historia, he joined the college as Lancaster Herald in 1727 and was promoted to Norroy in 1729; after serving as Clarenceux, he was promoted to Garter King of Arms in 1754. Leake was less interested in genealogy than the rights and history of the heralds; he petitioned for the college to have a monopoly on the researching of arms and unsuccessfully tried to revive the visitations, a proposal which Anstis and the government opposed. He also opened the college's register for Dissenting and Jewish births and carried out two Garter missions. On his death, his collections passed to his brother and were eventually bought by the college.	
	Charles Townley	11 January 1755 – 27 April 1773 (promoted)	Born at Tower Hill in London, Townley was the son of a merchant and educated at the Merchant Taylor's School from 1727. He bought his appointment as York Herald in 1735; he was promoted to Norroy in 1751 and, after his 18 years as Clarenceux, he was appointed Garter King of Arms in 1773. According to his predecessor Stephen Leake, he received a large fortune around 1755 and neglected his heraldic duties thereafter. He was nonetheless knighted in 1761. A number of his collections are in the possession of the college, including transcribed memorial inscriptions.	
	Thomas Browne	13 May 1773 – 15 August 1774 (promoted)	A native of Derbyshire, Browne was a land surveyor who was said to have worked for the Duke of Norfolk and converted his favour into heraldic appointments; the Oxford Dictionary of National Biography records that he carried out works for John Warburton, Somerset Herald. He was successively appointed Blanch Lyon (1727), Bluemantle (1737), Lancaster (1744), Norroy (1761) and Clarenceux before his appointment as Garter in 1774. Despite his success as a surveyor, he was reputed to have known little of heraldry and neglected his duties at the college.	
	Ralph Bigland	12 September 1774 – 2 March 1780 (promoted)	Bigland was the son of a Middlesex tallow chandler whose ancestors have been traced to Westmorland and Lancashire. He was apprenticed to a cheesemonger in 1728 and, after 9 years service, he entered his own trade and carried out his practice for over 20 years. He travelled to the Low Countries and Scotland and supplied cheese to the allied armies during the War of the Austrian Succession; it was on these travels that he began noting down memorial inscriptions, a pursuit to which he would devote his life. He compiled a huge collection of inscriptions relating to Gloucestershire, where he travelled extensively from 1750 onwards. These interests brought him to the college, where he was appointed Bluemantle Pursuivant in 1757 and promoted to Somerset Herald in 1759, Norroy in 1773, Clarenceux and then Garter in 1780. A competent and methodical genealogist and draughtsman, he took a particular interest in parish registers and campaigned for their indexing and the inclusion of greater detail in them. After his death, the majority of his Gloucestershire notes and transcriptions were published, although a number remained in manuscript form until the 1990s.	
	Isaac Heard	16 March 1780 – 1 May 1784 (promoted)	A native of Devon, Heard was educated at Honiton Grammar School before serving in the Royal Navy between 1745 and 1751. He then embarked on a career as a merchant first in Bilbao, Spain, and then London. An appointment as Bluemantle Pursuivant followed in 1759, with a promotion to Lancaster Herald two years later; in 1774, he was appointment Norroy King of Arms and Brunswick Herald, before his promotion to Clarenceux in 1780 and then Garter in 1784; he served as Earl Marshal's secretary (1782–84) and resigned as Brunswick in 1814. Heard was a proponent of the landscape heraldry which proved popular in the late Georgian period, and, inspired by his earlier travels, took a precocious interest in American genealogy. As a long-serving herald, his genealogical practice was large and much of his manuscript collection ended up in the college.	
	Thomas Lock	18 May 1784 – 24 February 1803 (promoted)		
	George Harrison	1803–1820		
	Sir George Nayler	30 May 1820 – 11 May 1822 (promoted)	The son of a Gloucestershire surgeon, Nayler practised as a miniature painter before buying his way into the offices of Blanc Coursier Herald and Genealogist of the Order of the Bath in 1792. He used the same means to obtain a place in the college as Bluemantle Pursuivant a year later; promotion to York Herald followed in 1794 after the accidental death of its incumbent. Further appointments as King of Arms to the Royal Guelphic Order and the Order of St Michael and St George (1815 and 1818 respectively) followed before he became Clarenceux, served as deputy Garter at George IV's Coronation in 1821 and was promoted to Garter in 1822. In the latter office, he continued to run a large practice at the college and conducted missions to France, Denmark, Russia and Portugal. Much of his earlier heraldic career involved disputes with the other heralds about his sole right to record pedigrees of the Knight of the Bath; despite objections, he compiled 47 volumes, which are now in the college's possession. He also worked on a history of George IV's Coronation, which was only partially published in his lifetime, and a manuscript history of the Order of the Bath, also owned by the college.	
	Ralph Bigland	4 June 1822 – 26 November 1831 (promoted)	Bigland was born on 1 May 1757, the son of Joseph Owen of Salford, Lancashire, but changed his surname in 1774 at the desire of his maternal uncle, Ralph Bigland, Garter. That year, he became Rouge Dragon Pursuivant and was appointed Richmond Herald in 1780. Promotions to Norroy (1803) and Clarenceux (1822) King of Arms followed before his appointment as Garter in 1831; he is the last officer to hold all three Kingships.	
	Sir William Woods	26 November 1831 – 23 July 1838 (promoted)	By tradition, Woods was reputed the son of the 11th Duke of Norfolk, but he bore the arms matriculated in 1812 in Scotland by one George Woods, a tailor of London and brother to a comedian called William. Whatever the case, details of his early life are also sparse. He was appointed secretary to the Knights Commander and Companions of the Order of the Bath in 1815 and then registrar of the Royal Guelphic Order later that year. He tried for Ross Herald in Scotland in 1816, but his first heraldic appointment was as Bluemantle Pursuivant in 1819, followed by Norfolk Herald in 1825, which he held jointly with Bluemantle. His promotion to Clarenceux King of Arms included service as deputy Garter (c. 1836) before a promotion to Garter itself in 1838.	
	Sir Edmund Lodge	1838–1839		
	Joseph Hawker	1839–1846		
	Francis Martin	1846–1848		
	James Pulman	1848–1859		
	Robert Laurie	1859–1882		
	Walter Blount	1882–1894		
	George Cokayne	1894–1911	Cokayne was born George Adams, but took his mother's maiden name as instructed in her will. He was educated privately and at Exeter College, Oxford, graduating in 1848. He was called to the Bar in 1853 but his first heraldic appointment was as Rouge Dragon Pursuivant in 1859, followed by promotions to Lancaster Herald in 1870 and Norroy King of Arms in 1882. As a herald, he took part in Garter missions to Portugal, Russia, Saxony, Spain and Italy, but it was as a genealogist that he is best remembered. As "G.E.C.", he published two enormous and scholarly works, The Complete Peerage and The Complete Baronetage; the former was enhanced by other editors in a second edition and is an authority on the history of the Peerage.	
	Sir William Weldon	1911–1919		
	Charles Athill	1919–1922		
	William Lindsay	1922–1926		
	Gordon Lee	1926–1927	Lee was born in Aberdeen, the son of a clergyman and local historian, and educated at Westminster School. After working as an artist, he became Bluemantle Pursuivant in 1889. Promotions followed: York Herald in 1905 and Norroy King of Arms in 1922. He also served as Earl Marshal's secretary in 1911, was an authority on Japanese art and edited The Episcopal Arms of England and Wales.	
	Sir Arthur Cochrane	1928–1954	The son of a clergyman and hospital master, Cochrane was a wine merchant before becoming secretary to Alfred Scott-Gatty, Garter King of Arms. He was appointed Rouge Croix Pursuivant in 1904, Chester Herald in 1915 and Norroy King of Arms in 1926. Godfrey and Wagner state that he produced "happy and original" coats of arms.	
	Archibald Russell	5 April 1954 – 30 November 1955	Russell was the son of a Chief Constable of the West Riding of Yorkshire. He was educated at Eton and Christ Church, Oxford, and entered the college as Rouge Croix Pursuivant in 1915. Although he served in the Colonial Office during the First World War and in the British embassy at Madrid afterwards, he was promoted to Lancaster Herald in 1922 and was Earl Marshal's secretary (1928–44). A keen art historian and collector of drawings and prints, he published a number of works on William Blake.	
	Sir John Heaton-Armstrong	20 January 1956 – 27 August 1967	Following schooling at Eton and Trinity Hall, Cambridge, Heaton-Armstrong was called to the Bar and fought in France and Palestine during the First World War. From 1920 to 1921 he served in the Colonial Office, but joined the college as Rouge Croix Pursuivant in 1922 before a promotion to Chester Herald in 1926.	
	John Walker	23 December 1968 – 1978 (retirement)	The son of an Indian Army officer and the grandson of a Lincolnshire baronet (through his mother), Walker trained at the Royal Military College, Sandhurst, and served in the York and Lancaster Regiment and then the 14th Sikhs. He took on a number of staff roles in India, before joining the college as Rouge Croix Pursuivant in 1947. A promotion to Lancaster Herald followed in 1953 and he served as registrar at the college from 1960 to 1967 and Inspector of the Regimental Colours, 1977–78. He died aged 71 in 1984.	
	Sir Anthony Wagner	2 October 1978 – 5 May 1995	Wagner was the son of a schoolmaster and a graduate of Balliol College, Oxford. His first appointment at the college was as Portcullis in 1931, but during the Second World War, he served in the War Office and then the Ministry of Town and County Planning; a keen architectural historian, he helped to draw up guidelines on listing buildings. He was promoted to Richmond in 1943 and left the civil service for the college in 1946, where he was appointed Garter in 1961. Wagner oversaw the funeral of Sir Winston Churchill and the investiture of Charles, Prince of Wales, and was the first director of the Heralds' Museum; on his retirement as Garter he became Clarenceux. A leading genealogist and historian of the college, Wagner published a number of important books on the topics, including Heralds of England, Heralds and Heraldry in the Middles Ages, Pedigree and Progress and English Genealogy, alongside several catalogues of the college's manuscript collection; in 1957, Oxford University awarded him the degree of DLitt and he was twice knighted, as KCB and KCVO.	
	John Brooke-Little	19 June 1995 – 1997 (retirement)	Brooke-Little was educated at Clayesmore School and New College, Oxford, where his interest in heraldry grew and his friends included the future Garter, Colin Cole. He joined the Earl Marshal's staff in 1952 and was a Gold Stick Officer at the Coronation in 1953. Appointed Bluemantle Pursuivant in 1956 and Richmond Herald in 1967, Brooke-Little also served as registrar at the college (1974–82), Norroy and Ulster King of Arms and registrar of the Order of St Patrick (1980–85) and director of the Heralds' Museum from 1991 till his retirement. He founded the Heraldry Society in 1947 and served as its chairman for fifty years, after which he was its president; he edited its journal, The Coat of Arms, until 2004. His published work included updated editions of Boutell's Heraldry and Fox-Davies's Complete Guide to Heraldry. According to The Telegraph, he was the "brightest and ablest herald of his generation", but did not attain Gartership partly due to his "chaotic working practices". He died in 2006.	
	Hubert Chesshyre	28 April 1997 – 2010 (retirement)	After graduating from Trinity College, Cambridge, and Christ Church, Oxford, Chesshyre became Rouge Croix Pursuivant in 1970, before serving as Chester Herald between 1978 and 1995 and Honorary Genealogist to the Royal Victorian Order from 1987 to 2010. He was a member of the Westminster Abbey Architectural Advisory Panel and the Heraldry Society's Council. Along with Thomas Woodcock, he co-authored the Dictionary of British Arms: Medieval Armorial, volume 1. He was later found to have committed child sexual abuse.	
	Patric Dickinson	1 September 2010 – 2021 (retirement)	Dickinson was educated at Exeter College, Oxford, where he served as president of the Oxford Union in 1972. A research assistant at the College of Arms since 1968, his first heraldic appointment was ten years later, when he became Rouge Dragon Pursuivant. Promotions to Richmond Herald (1989) and Norroy and Ulster King of Arms (2010) followed, before he became Clarenceux. Having served as the college's treasurer since 1995, Dickinson was also the Earl Marshal's secretary from 1996 to 2012 and has been president of the Society of Genealogists since 2005. He is a Bencher of Middle Temple.	
	Timothy Duke	1 April 2021 - 2024 (retirement)	Educated at Fitzwilliam College, Cambridge, Duke served as a research assistant at the College of Arms from 1981. Appointed Rouge Dragon Pursuivant 1989, Chester Herald 1995, Norroy and Ulster King of Arms 2014, then Clarenceux in which role he proclaimed the accession of Charles III from the Royal Exchange in the City of London in September 2022.	
	Robert Noel	Appointed 28 October 2024	Educated at Exeter College, Oxford and St Edmund's College, Cambridge. Noel was appointed Bluemantle Pursuivant 1992, Lancaster Herald 1999, Norroy and Ulster King of Arms 2021, then Clarenceux.	

== See also ==
- Heraldry
- Officer of Arms
