= Algar Howard =

British army officer and officer of arms (1880–1970)

Major General Sir Algar Howard KCB KCVO MC TD
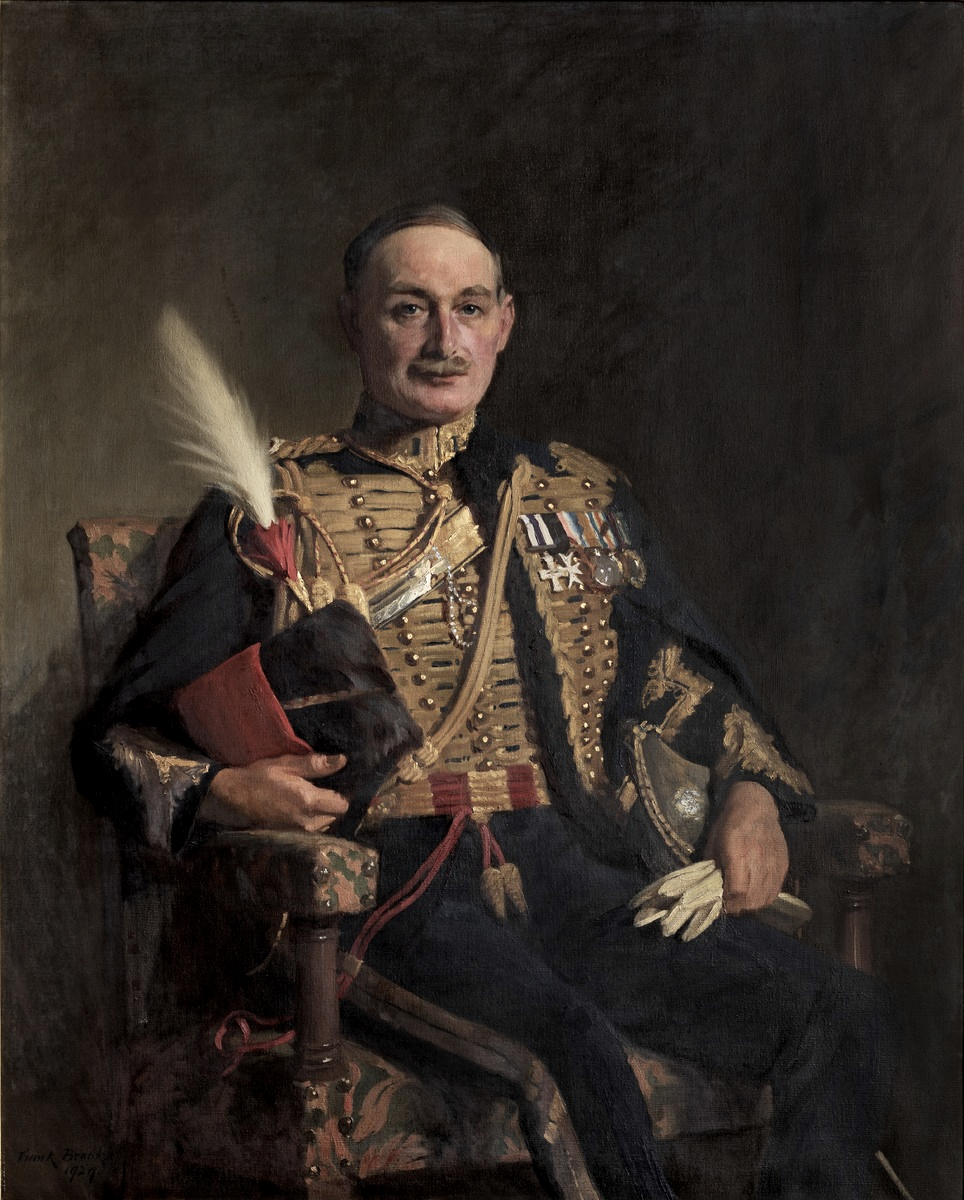
- Algar Howard in military dress, 1929 portrait

Garter Principal King of Arms
- In office 2 June 1944 – 6 December 1950
- Monarch: George VI
- Preceded by: Sir Gerald Wollaston
- Succeeded by: George Bellew

Personal details
- Born: Algar Henry Stafford Howard; 7 August 1880
- Died: 14 February 1970 (aged 89)
- Spouse: Violet Ethel (m. 1921)
- Children: 2
- Education: Harrow School; King's College London
- Occupation: Herald

Sir Algar Henry Stafford Howard KCB KCVO MC TD (7 August 1880 – 14 February 1970) was a senior British Army officer and long-serving officer of arms at the College of Arms in London. He served as the Garter Principal King of Arms from 1944 to 1950 before retiring. He was the third consecutive Fitzalan Pursuivant of Arms Extraordinary to attain the highest rank at the College of Arms.

== Early life ==
Algar Henry Stafford Howard was born on 7 August 1880. He was the eldest son of Sir Edward Stafford Howard, KCB, JP, DL (1851–1916), of Thornbury Castle and Cilymeanllwyd in Carmarthenshire, and his first wife, Lady Rachel Campbell (died 1906), youngest daughter of John Campbell, 2nd Earl Cawdor. He was educated at Harrow School and King's College London, and was called to the bar in 1904.

== Military career ==
Howard was appointed a second lieutenant of the Carmarthen Militia Artillery on 31 January 1900, and was promoted to Lieutenant on 6 September 1900. In 1908, with the militia Carmarthen Royal Garrison Artillery and having the rank of captain, he was moved to the Royal Gloucestershire Hussars as a second lieutenant.

Howard served with the Royal Gloucestershire Hussars from 1914 in the First World War, to 1919. He took part in the landing at Suvla Bay in the third week of August 1915. In Egypt in November 1915 he was defending the Suez Canal. He was in action with "D" Squadron of the Hussars in the Sinai and Palestine campaign in October 1917. He won the Military Cross in 1918 and was mentioned in dispatches.

A private diary by Howard survived for August 1915 to October 1918. His rank of Major he retained later in the Gloucestershire Yeomanry.

== Heraldic career ==
Howard began his heraldic career on 23 May 1911 with an appointment as Fitzalan Pursuivant of Arms Extraordinary for the coronation of King George V. This was followed in October of that year with an appointment to the office of Rouge Dragon Pursuivant of Arms in Ordinary.

In 1919, Howard was promoted to the office of Windsor Herald of Arms in Ordinary and he held this position until 1931. In that year he was made Norroy King of Arms when Sir Gerald Woods Wollaston was promoted. Howard was also appointed Registrar of the College of Arms in 1928, and during the Second World War the records of the college were stored at his home of Thornbury Castle in Gloucestershire for safekeeping.

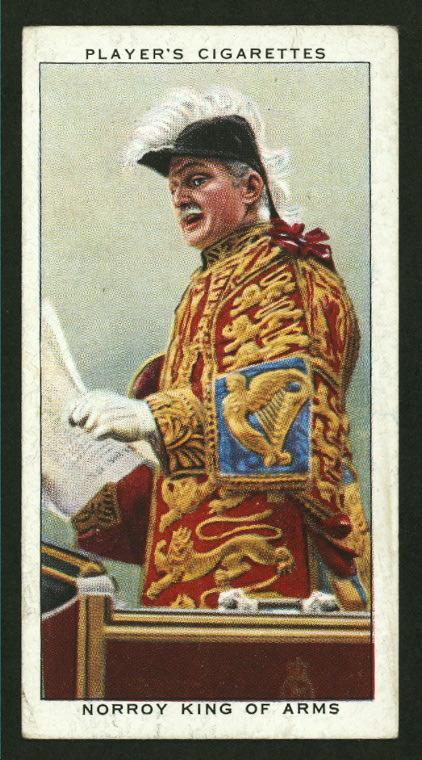
Howard reading the 1936 accession proclamation, cigarette card

In 1943, the office of Ulster King of Arms was merged with that of Norroy and Howard became the first Norroy and Ulster King of Arms. He remained in this office until 1944 when he was promoted to Garter Principal King of Arms, succeeding Gerald Wollaston. He retired from this office, and from the College of Arms, in 1950.

Howard was created Commander of the Royal Victorian Order (CVO) in 1935, Companion of the Bath (CB) in 1937, Knight Commander of the Royal Victorian Order (KCVO) in 1944, and Knight Commander of the Bath (KCB) in 1951.

== Arms ==
Coat of arms of Algar Howard, Garter king of arms (1944-1950)
Coronet King of Arms Crest On a chapeau gules turned up ermine a lion statant gardant, tail extended. Escutcheon His arms of office, impaling Howard arms, viz. Gules, on a bend between 6 crosses crosslet fitchy argent a scocheon or charged with a demi-lion rampant pierced through the mouth with an arrow in a royal tressure gules.. Motto Sola Virtus Invicta ("Virtue alone is invincible") Orders the circlet of the Royal Victorian Order and Order of the Bath. Collar of Esses. Badge A slip of oak vert fructed or charged on the stem with a crescent sable (granted 1913). Symbolism Arms derived from the House of Howard and the Dukes of Norfolk.

== Family ==
Howard married Violet Ethel, daughter of Sir Henry Meysey Meysey-Thompson, 1st and last Baron Knaresborough, on 11 October 1921. She was the widow of Captain Alexander Moore Vandeleur, 2nd Life Guards, who was killed in action at Zandvoorde during the First Battle of Ypres on 30 October 1914. Vandeleur was a son of Hector Stewart Vandeleur (1836–1909), and grandson of Crofton Moore Vandeleur.

The couple had two daughters: Anne Violet (born 1923), who married John Cahill, son of John Cahill, of Knockrom West in Scartaglen; and Elizabeth Helen (born 1924), who married Harold William Norman Suckling Walker, eldest son of Colonel James Coulthard Walker of the Indian Army.

== See also ==
- Heraldry
- Pursuivant
- Herald
- King of Arms
