= Bluemantle Pursuivant =

Officer of the College of Arms

- The heraldic badge of Bluemantle Pursuivant of Arms in Ordinary
- Heraldic tradition: Gallo-British
- Jurisdiction: England, Wales and Northern Ireland
- Governing body: College of Arms

Flag of the Bluemantle Pursuivant

Bluemantle Pursuivant of Arms in Ordinary is a junior officer of arms of the College of Arms in London.

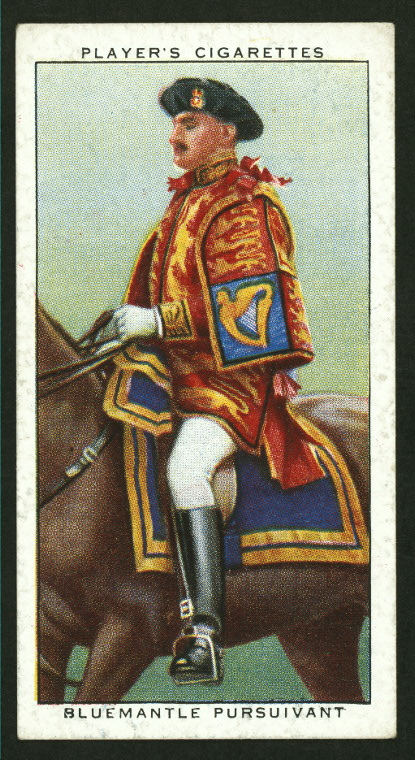
Bluemantle Pursuivant Richard Graham-Vivian, part of a 1937 series of cigarette cards marking the Coronation of George VI.

The office is reputed to have been created by Henry V to serve the Order of the Garter, but there is no documentary evidence of this. There is, however, mention of an envoy styled Blewmantle going to France in 1448. The first Bluemantle to be mentioned by name is found in a record circa 1484. The badge of office, probably deriving from the original blue silk material of the Order of the Garter, is blazoned as A Blue Mantle lined Ermine cords and tassels Or.

A 19th-century Bluemantle Pursuivant founded Bluemantle's Cricket Club.

The incumbent is James Lawson Broun, who was appointed on 25 August 2026.

== Holders of the office ==
Arms	Name	Date of appointment	Ref
	John Ashwell or Haswell	(Henry V)	
	John Ashwell	(Henry V)	
	Thomas More	(1419)	
	Thomas Collyer	(Henry V)	
	William Hawkeslowe	(Henry VI)	
	John Horsley	(Henry VI)	
	Richard Stanton	(Henry VI)	
	James Collyer or Collier	(Henry VI)	
	John Ferrant	(Henry VI)	
	Roger Mallett	(Henry VI)	
	Henry French or Franke	(Edward IV)	
	Richard Champneys	(Edward IV)	
	Thomas Hollingsworth	(Edward IV)	
	Roger Bromley	(Edward IV)	
	John Brice	(Edward IV)	
	Thomas French or Franke	(Edward IV)	
	Rowland Playnford	(Edward IV)	
	Laurence Alford	(1484)	
	... Banastre	1503–1507	
	Francis Dyes	1508–1510	
	Ralph Lago	1510–1522	
	Thomas Bysley	1522–1528	
	John Hutton	1528–1528	
	John Narboone	1528–1536	
	Richard Ratcliffe	1536–1543	
	William Harvey	1543–1545	
	Edmund Atkynson	1545–1550	
	Nicholas Narboone	1550–1557	
	John Hollingworth	1557–1559	
	Richard Turpin	1559–1565	
	Nicholas Dethick	1565–1583	
	Humphry Hales	1583–1587	
	James Thomas	1587–1589	
	Robert Treswell	1589–1597	
	Mercury Patten	1597–1611	
	Sir Henry St George	1611–1616	
	Sampson Lennard	1616–1633	
	William Ryley	1633–1641	
	Robert Browne	1641–1646	
	John Watson	1646–1660	
	Robert Chaloner	1660–1665	
	Richard Hornebrooke	1665–1667	
	Thomas Segar	1669–1670	
	John Gibbon	1670–1719	
	James Greene	1719–1737	
	Thomas Browne	1737–1743	
	John Pine	1743–1747	
	Sir Ralph Bigland	1747–1752	
	John Ward	1752–1761	
	Sir Isaac Heard	1761–1762	
	Henry Pujolas	1762–1763	
	Peter Dore	1763–1764	
	George Browne	1764–1767	
	George Harrison	1767–1774	
	Sir Charles Townley	1774–1781	
	Sir Edmund Lodge	1781–1793	
	Sir George Nayler	1793–1794	
	John Havers	1794–1797	
	Francis Martin, Jr.	1797–1819	
	Sir William Woods	1819–1831	
	George Harrison Rogers-Harrison	1831–1849	
	Henry Murray Lane	1849–1864	
	Henry Harrington Molyneux-Seel	1864–1873	
	Edward Bellasis	1873–1882	
	Charles Harold Athill	1882–1889	
	Gordon Ambrose de Lisle Lee	1889–1905	
	Sir Gerald Woods Wollaston	1906–1919	
	Philip Plantagenet Cary	1919–1923	
	Edmund Clarence Richard Armstrong	1923–1923	
	Aubrey John Toppin	1923–1932	
	Richard Preston Graham-Vivian	1933–1947	
	James Arnold Frere	1948–1956	
	John Philip Brook Brooke-Little	1956–1967	
	Francis Sedley Andrus	1970–1972	
	Sir Peter Llewellyn Gwynn-Jones	1973–1983	
	Terence David McCarthy	1983–1991	
	Robert John Baptist Noel	1992–1999	
	Michael Peter Desmond O'Donoghue	2005–2012	
	Mark John Rosborough Scott	2019–2024	
	James van Someren Peill	2024–2026	
	James Lawson Broun	2026–present	

== See also ==
- Heraldry
- Officer of Arms
