= Gordon de Lisle Lee =

Gordon Ambrose de Lisle Lee CB CVO (11 July 1863 – 12 September 1927) was a British officer of arms, an expert in Japanese art and heraldry and a stage designer.

== Early life ==
Lee was born in Aberdeen, the second son of Reverend Frederick George Lee, vicar of All Saints, Lambeth. He was educated at St Mary's College, Harlow and Westminster School and became an artist and designer.

In 1888, he married Rose, the eldest daughter of Robert Wallace, Secretary to the Earl Marshal.

== College of Arms ==
In 1889, he joined the College of Arms as Bluemantle Pursuivant. He was appointed York Herald on 29 November 1905 in succession to George William Marshall and then Norroy King of Arms in 1922, before being appointed Clarenceux King of Arms, the Principal Herald of South, East and West England, on 5 October 1926 in succession to William Lindsay. He was secretary to the Earl Marshal from 1911 to 1917 and the Deputy Earl Marshal from 1917 until his death.

He was appointed Companion of the Order of the Bath (CB) in the 1920 New Year War Honours and Commander of the Royal Victorian Order (CVO) in the 1926 New Year Honours.

== Works ==
- Blessed Margaret of Salisbury: a sketch of the life and times of the last of the Plantagenets. London: B. F. Laslett. 1887. OCLC 7627433.
- The Episcopal Arms of England and Wales (pamphlet). London: A. Fairbairns. 1906. OCLC 15503448.

== Arms ==
Coat of arms of Gordon de Lisle Lee
Adopted 1893 Crest A falcon or with a hawk's lure sable entwined about its body, legs gules, & bells or, preying on an eagle's leg in fess azure erased at the thigh, claws to the sinister. Escutcheon Argent, on a fess couped between 3 crescents sable 3 hawk's lures or. Motto Fide et Constantia Previous versions As Bluemantle: Argent, a fess between 3 crescents sable.
