= Archibald G. B. Russell =

English art historian (1879–1955)

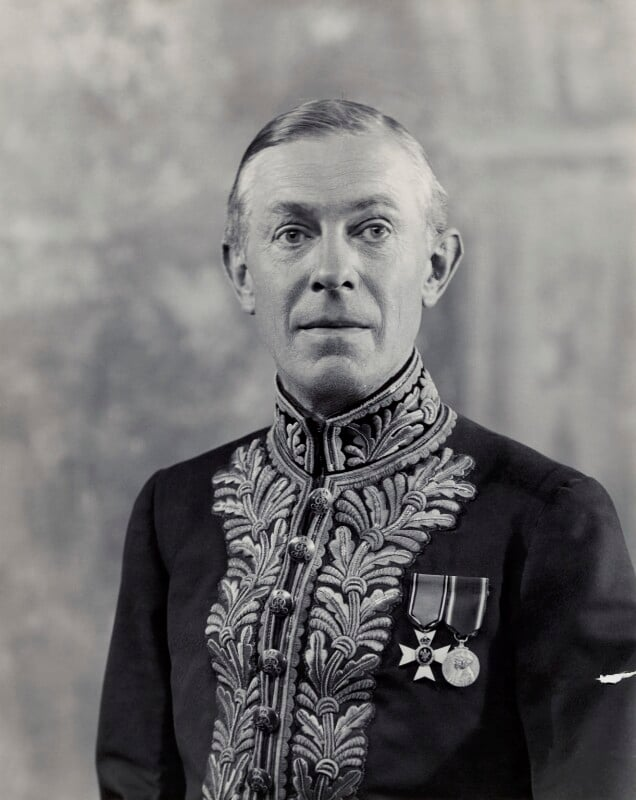
Russell in 1936

Archibald George Blomefield Russell CVO FSA (20 June 1879 – 30 November 1955) was an English art historian and a long-serving officer of arms at the College of Arms in London.

== Early life ==
Russell was the fourth son of Theodosius Stuart Russell, Chief Constable of Yorkshire, and his wife Louisa Blomefield the daughter of Rev. Sir Thomas Blomefield, 3rd Baronet. Russell was educated at Eton and Christ Church, Oxford and became a journalist, art critic and art historian, writing works on William Blake.

== Heraldic career ==
Russell's heraldic career began on 10 November 1915 when he was made Rouge Croix Pursuivant of Arms In Ordinary. The vacancy in this office occurred due to the promotion of Arthur Cochrane to the office of Chester Herald earlier in the year. On 21 April 1922, Russell was promoted to the office of Lancaster Herald of Arms in Ordinary. This appointment came as a result of the death of the previous Lancaster, Edward Bellasis. Russell served as a herald in ordinary for more than thirty years. In 1954, with the death of Arthur Cochrane, a vacancy occurred in the office of Clarenceux King of Arms. Russell was chosen to fill the position and held it until his death a year later.

Russell married Janet Frances Kerr in 1915 and had two sons who were killed during World War II. In his later years he was an ardent collector of moths and butterflies. He was a Fellow of the Royal Society of Antiquaries and a Fellow of the Royal Entomological Society.

== Published works ==
- The Prophetic Books of William Blake: Jerusalem, Ed., 1904.
- The Letters of William Blake; together with a Life by Frederick Tatham. Methuen, 1906.
- The Prophetic Books of William Blake: Milton, Ed., 1907.
- The engravings of William Blake, Houghton Mifflin, 1912.

== Arms ==
Coat of arms of Archibald George Blomefield Russell
Adopted 1917 Crest A goat statant argent horns & hooves or, in its mouth a rose argent, slipped & leaved vert. Escutcheon Argent, a lion sable & on a chief sable 2 roses argent. Motto che sara sara Badge Badge granted 1924: A pineapple or.
