= Aubrey Toppin =

English officer of arms

- Born: 1881; Twickenham, England
- Died: 1969 (aged 87–88)
- Military career
- Allegiance: United Kingdom
- Branch: British Army
- Conflicts: First World War

Aubrey John Toppin CVO FSA (1881 – 1969) was a long-serving English officer of arms at the College of Arms in London.

Toppin was born in Twickenham in 1881. His first job was at the Science and Art Museum, Dublin from 1901 to 1906, until he gained the post of First Assistant to the Keeper of Irish Antiquities at the National Museum of Ireland in 1906. In 1907, he was promoted to the position of Assistant Keeper of the Art and Antiquities Division, a position which he held until his retirement from Ireland in 1923.

Toppin also served ably during World War I and was a captain in the Third Battalion, the Royal Irish Rifles. His heraldic career began on 24 July 1923, when Toppin was appointed Bluemantle Pursuivant of Arms in Ordinary. In 1932, Toppin was promoted to the rank of herald of arms when he was made York Herald of Arms in Ordinary. He held this position until 1957, when he was made Norroy and Ulster King of Arms. When Toppin retired from this post in 1966, he was appointed Maltravers Herald of Arms Extraordinary and held that position until his death three years later.

== Arms ==
Coat of arms of Aubrey Toppin
Adopted 23 April 1927 Crest In front of a rising sun a heron with wings expanded holding in the beak a luce, all proper. Escutcheon Argent, a cross engrailed between 4 herons' heads erased sable. Motto Deo, Patriae, Amicis

== See also ==
- King of Arms
- Herald
- Pursuivant
