= Our Lady of Sorrows Church, Bognor Regis =

Our Lady of Sorrows Church
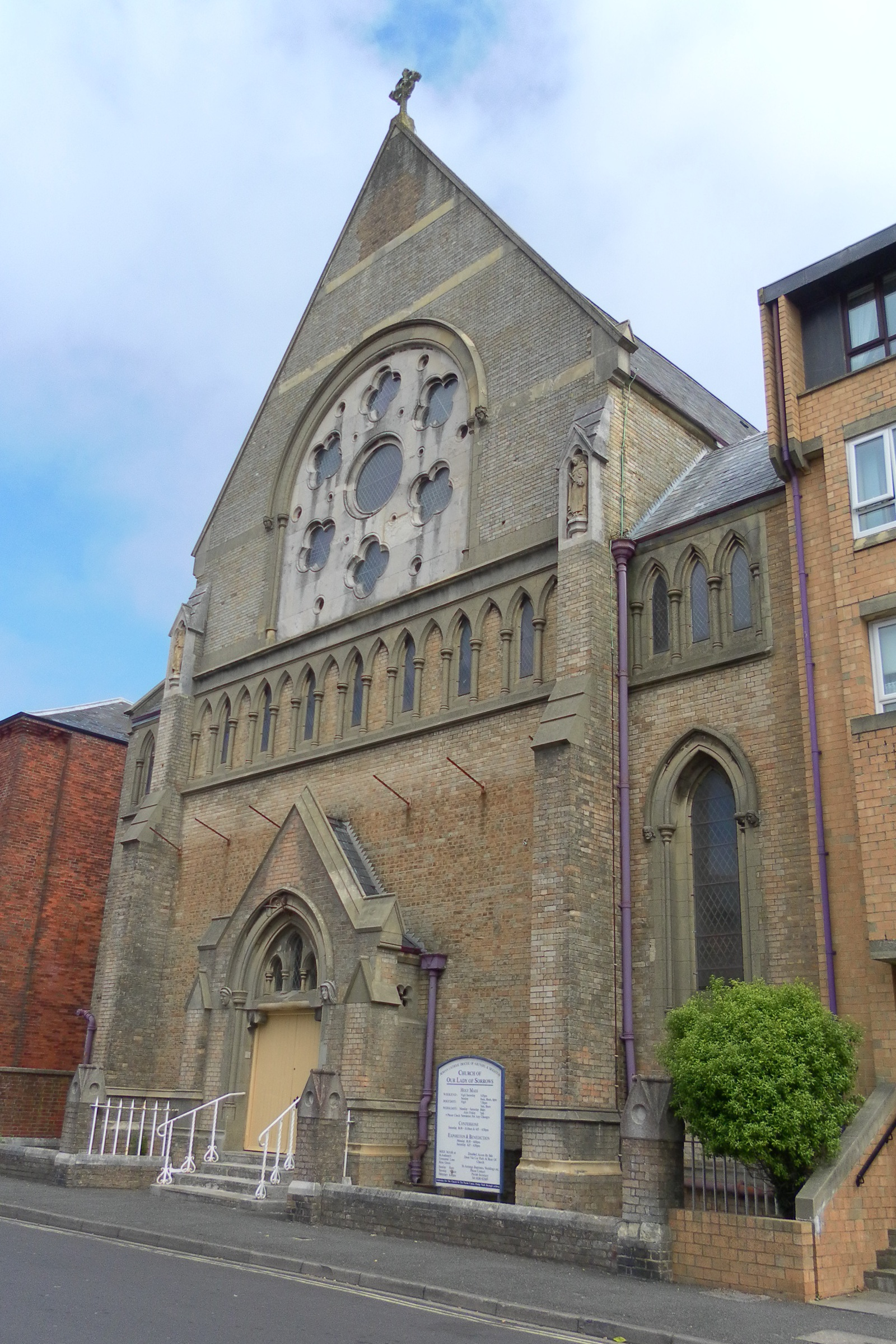
- Our Lady of Sorrows Church
- 50.7842°N 0.6701°W
- Location: Bognor Regis, West Sussex
- Country: England
- Denomination: Roman Catholic
- Website: BognorCatholicParish.co.uk

History
- Status: Active
- Founder: Servites
- Dedication: Our Lady of Sorrows
- Dedicated: 16 August 1882

Architecture
- Functional status: Parish church
- Heritage designation: Grade II listed
- Designated: 4 June 2015
- Architect(s): Joseph Stanislaus Hansom; Wilfrid Clarence Mangan
- Style: Gothic Revival
- Groundbreaking: 26 October 1881
- Completed: 1957

Administration
- Province: Southwark
- Diocese: Arundel and Brighton
- Deanery: Cathedral

Our Lady of Sorrows Church is a Roman Catholic Parish church in Bognor Regis, West Sussex, England. It was built from 1881 to 1882 and designed by Joseph Stanislaus Hansom. It is situated on the corner of the High Street and Clarence Road, backing on to Albert Road, in the centre of the town. It was founded by the Servite Order and is a Grade II listed building.

== History ==
=== Construction ===
In 1880, the Servites founded a mission in Bognor Regis. On 26 October 1881, the foundation stone of the church was laid. The architect of the church was Joseph Stanislaus Hansom. He was the son of Joseph Hansom and also designed, with his father, Our Lady of Dolours Church in Fulham, London for the Servites.

On 16 August 1882, the church was opened by Canon John Butt, who later became Bishop of Southwark in 1885. However, the church was not fully built, because the nave, transepts, Lady Chapel and sanctuary were not completed. As the church was still in use, a temporary wall was built on the east side of the church.

=== Completion ===
From 1955 to 1957, the church was completed. The architect who carried out Hansom's plans was Wilfrid Clarence Mangan. He was originally commissioned to finish the church in 1939, but World War Two prevented any work being done.

Hansom also designed a Servite priory next door to the church. In the 1980s, the priory was demolished and a block of flats was built in its place. In 1985, the church was reordered by the firm, Messrs Ormsby of Scarisbrick. In 1994, the Servites handed administration of the church over to the Diocese of Arundel and Brighton who continue to serve the parish.

== Parish ==
The parish of Our Lady of Sorrows in Bognor Regis also has two other churches: St Richard of Chichester Church in Slindon and St Anthony of Viareggio Church in Rose Green, Aldwick.

=== St Richard of Chichester Church ===
St Richard of Chichester Church in Slindon is situated on Top Road, opposite the junction with Church Hill. It was made a Grade II listed building by English Heritage on 20 April 2005. In 1814, the Anthony Radclyffe, 5th Earl of Newburgh, died and his legacy provided for the cost of constructing a church for the Catholic congregation in Slindon. However, his widow wanted to maintain the family chapel as the centre of worship and it was not until after her death that construction on St Richard’s Church started. It was built in 1865 and designed by Charles Alban Buckler (1824-1905).

He was the son of John Chessell Buckler and designed numerous churches including St Thomas of Canterbury Chapel in Exton Hall, St Peter's Church in Shoreham-by-Sea, the Church of St Thomas of Canterbury and English Martyrs in St Leonards-on-Sea, St Edward the Confessor Church in Sutton Place, Surrey, and St Dominic's Priory Church near Hampstead Heath. Between 1890 and 1903 he worked on Arundel Castle and is buried in Sutton Place.

=== St Anthony of Viareggio Church ===
In 1961, St Anthony of Viareggio Church was bequeathed to the Servite Friars by a Mr Brown. It was originally a bungalow and was renovated when it became a church. A Fr Anselm Hislop OSM was in charge of the renovation and added the church tower. On 6 May 1963, St Anthony of Viareggio's Church was opened by the Archbishop of Southwark, Cyril Cowderoy.

=== Times ===
Our Lady of Sorrows Church has three Sunday Masses: 6:00pm on Saturday,9:00am and 11:00am on Sunday

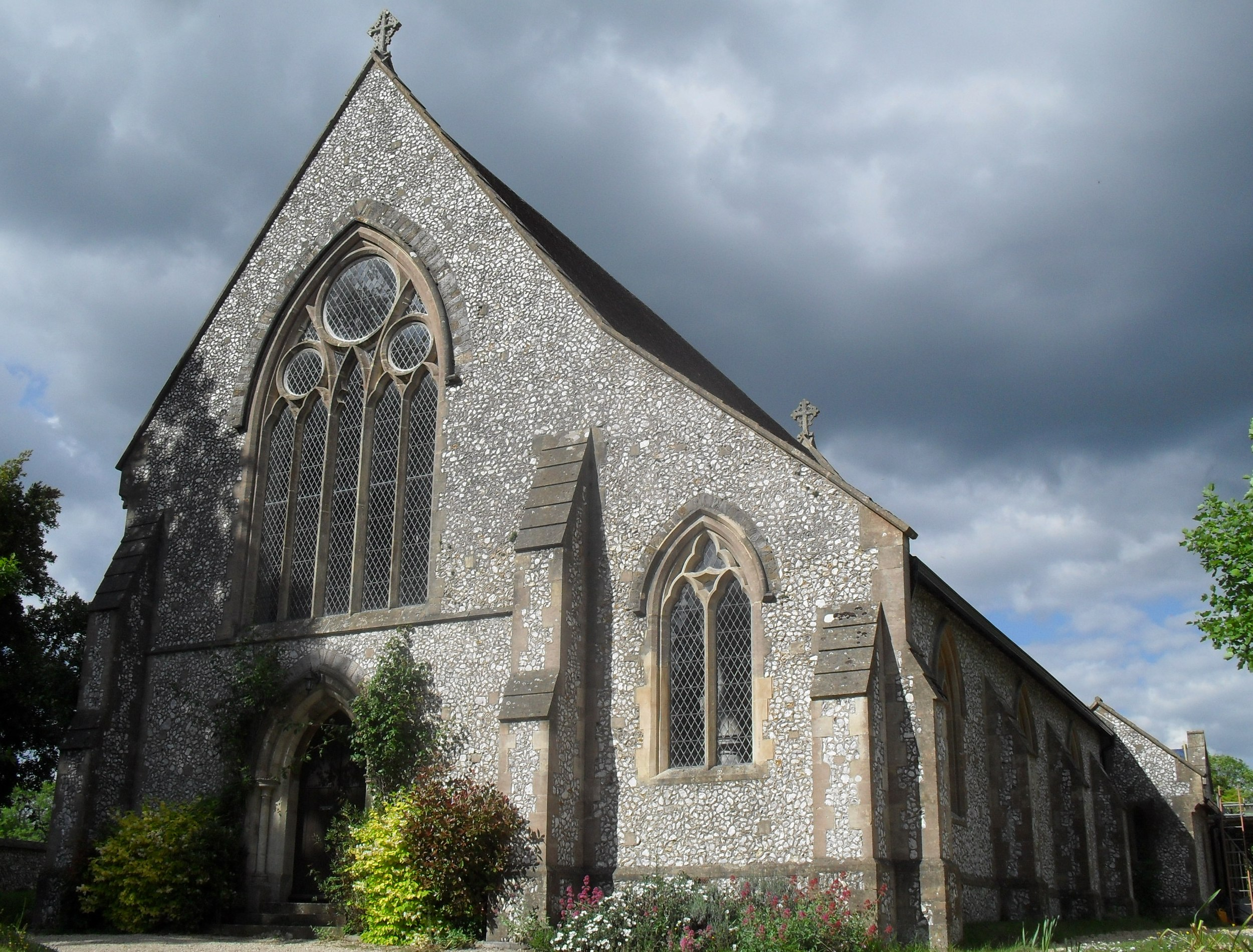
St Richard of Chichester Church in Slindon

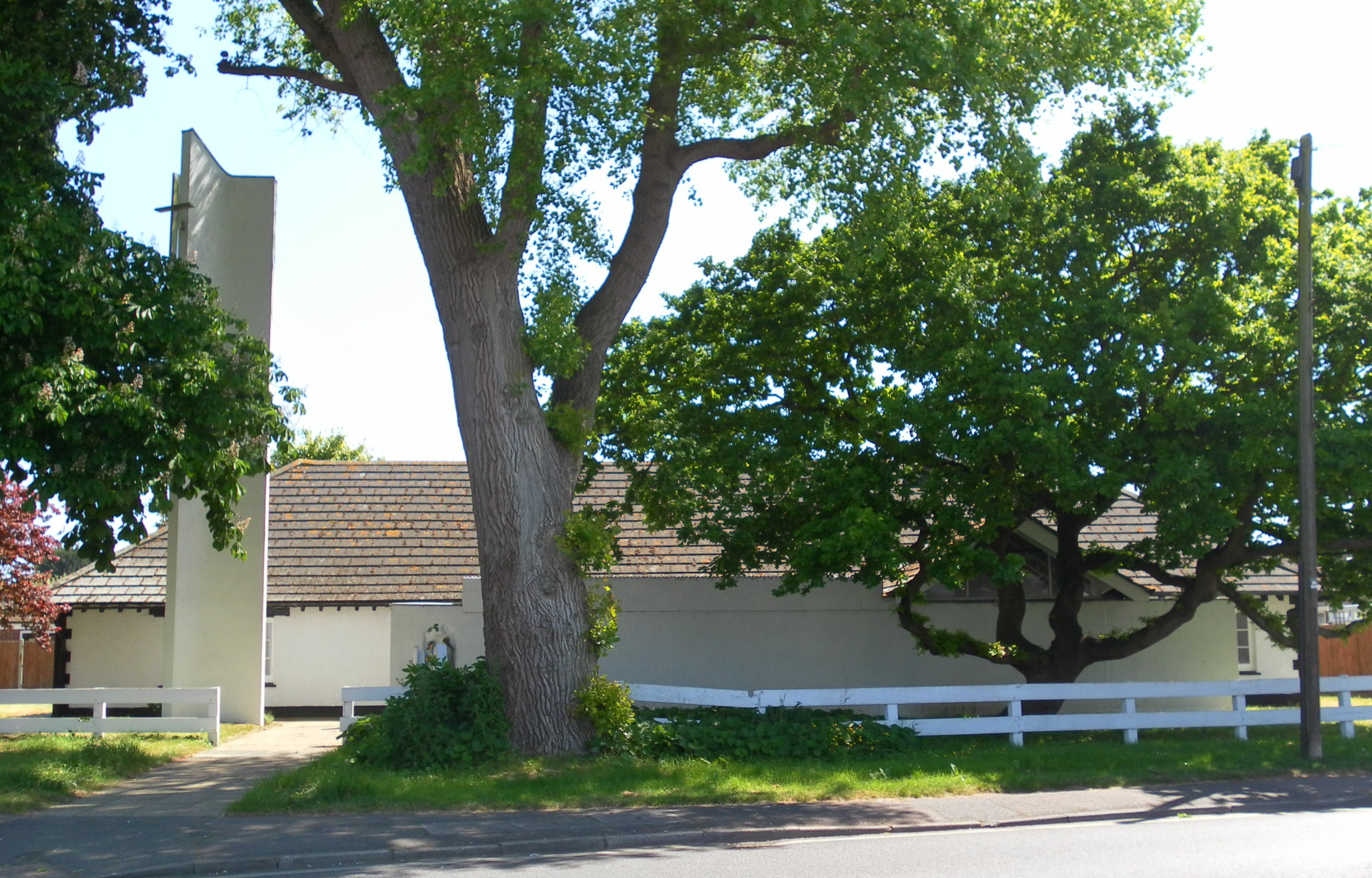
St Anthony of Viareggio's Church, Aldwick

== See also ==
- Servite Order
- Roman Catholic Diocese of Arundel and Brighton
- List of places of worship in Arun
