= John Buckler =

John Buckler may refer to:

- John Buckler (artist) (1770–1851), British artist and occasional architect
- John Chessell Buckler (1793–1894), his son, British architect
- John Buckler (actor) (1906–1936), British actor
