= Sutton Place, Surrey =

Grade I listed tudor manor house

Sutton Place
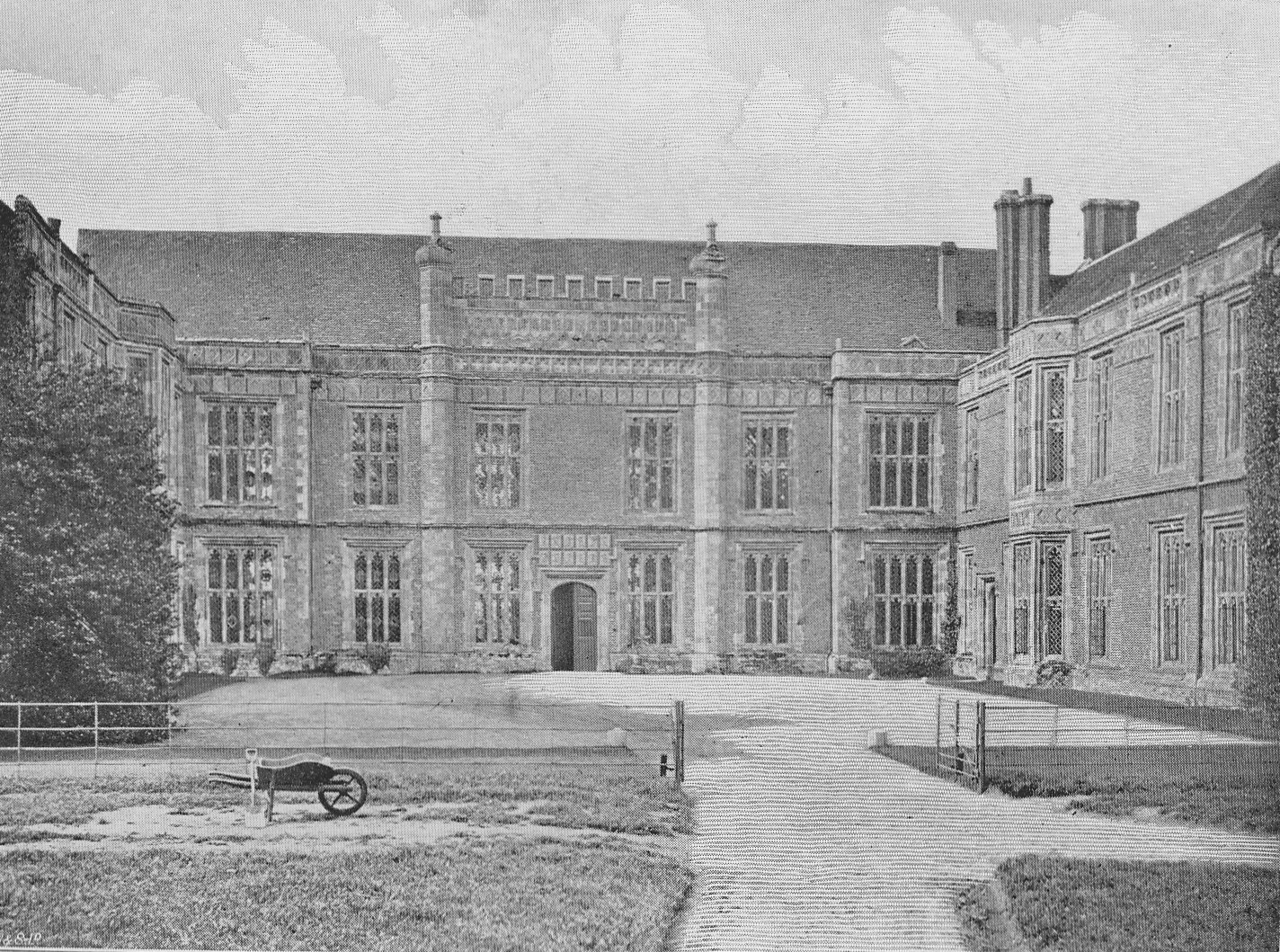
- Sutton Place photographed before 1899

- Location within Surrey
- 51°16′19″N 0°33′03″W
- Type: Prodigy house
- Location: Woking, Surrey

History
- Built: c.1525

Site notes
- Architectural style: Tudor
- Owner: Discretionary irrevocable Trust founded by Alisher Usmanov

Listed Building – Grade I
- Official name: Sutton Place including the service courtyard
- Designated: 22 July 1953
- Reference no.: 1236810

Listed Building – Grade II
- Official name: Entrance lodge and gates to Sutton Place
- Designated: 13 January 1972
- Reference no.: 1294915

Sutton Place, 3 miles (4.8 km) north-east (Note: Sutton Place is in the borough of Woking and the ecclesiastical parish of Burpham – Burpham Church of the Holy Spirit) of Guildford in Surrey, is a large Grade I listed Tudor prodigy house built c. 1525 by Sir Richard Weston (d. 1541), a courtier of Henry VIII.

It is of importance to art history in showing some of the earliest traces of Italianate Renaissance design elements in English architecture. In modern times, the estate has had a series of wealthy owners, initially J. Paul Getty, then the world's richest private citizen, who spent the last 17 years of his life there. It is currently owned by a discretionary irrevocable trust created by an Uzbek Russian billionaire, Alisher Usmanov. A definitive history of the house and manor, first published in 1893, was written by Frederic Harrison (d. 1923), jurist and historian, whose father had acquired the lease in 1874.

== Architecture ==
=== Historical assessment ===
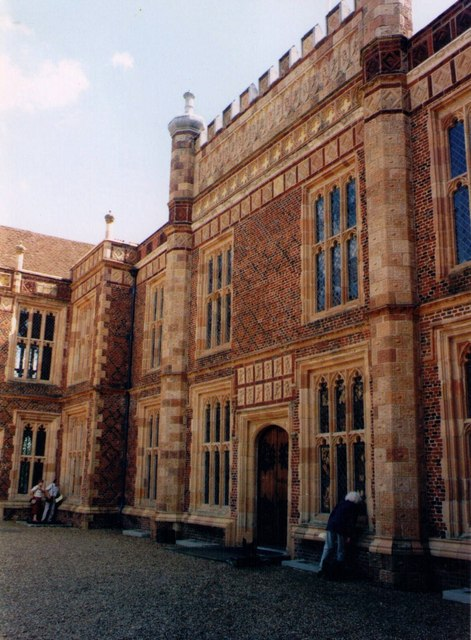
Entrance courtyard

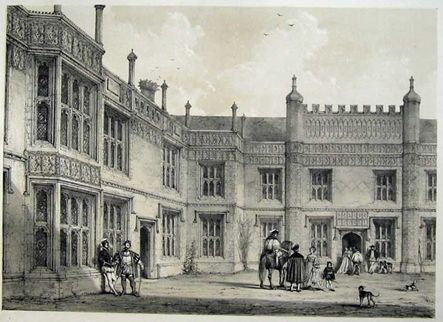
Imaginary Tudor scene in courtyard of Sutton Place depicted c. 1840 by Joseph Nash

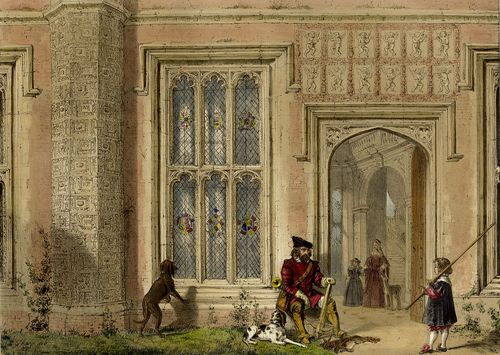
Front doorway to Sutton Place, in shape of Tudor arch, imaginary Tudor scene by Nash, c. 1840

Bindoff (1982) stated:

The building, with its perpendicular forms overlaid with Italian ornament, bears little resemblance to any other courtier's house of the 1520s, and it ranks with the vanished Nonsuch Palace as a landmark in the introduction of Italian Renaissance ideas"

Harrison (1899) stated it to be "a landmark in the history of art", and "a cinquecento conception in an English gothic frame". He identified it as "one of the first houses built as a peaceful residence, with no thought for defence...one of the first country houses in the modern sense, instead of an imitation castle...Weston perceived that the Wars of the Barons were over, that a gentleman might live at his ease under protection of law and the king's peace". Weston was certainly daring in his choice of eye-catching decoration above his front-door, for which he surely risked being ridiculed by his manly friends, including the king himself: innocent loving children at play: the amorini. Was this a signal by an avant-gard Sir Richard to his visitors, many of whom must have been valiant and experienced soldiers, that his house was to be a haven where love and play were de rigueur, not the old-fashioned militaristic conversations and behaviours? What a different message this was to that placed above the gates of Dante's Inferno: Lasciate ogne speranza, voi ch'intrate, "Abandon all hope, ye who enter here".

At Sutton, the defensive towers and turrets of the old castles and fortified manors have been reduced to mere pilasters, covered with decorative terracotta, caricatures of their former selves, as symbols of a deliberate rejection of defensive elements by Weston. The symbolism of the short stretch of crenellated parapet on the roofline above the front door, one of the most potent aspects of the old defensive fortress, has been disarmed and cancelled-out by amorini, in what has been seen as a dissonant juxtaposition, presumably deliberate. Sutton is a house with a message to proclaim, which would not have been missed by its visitors.

=== Description ===
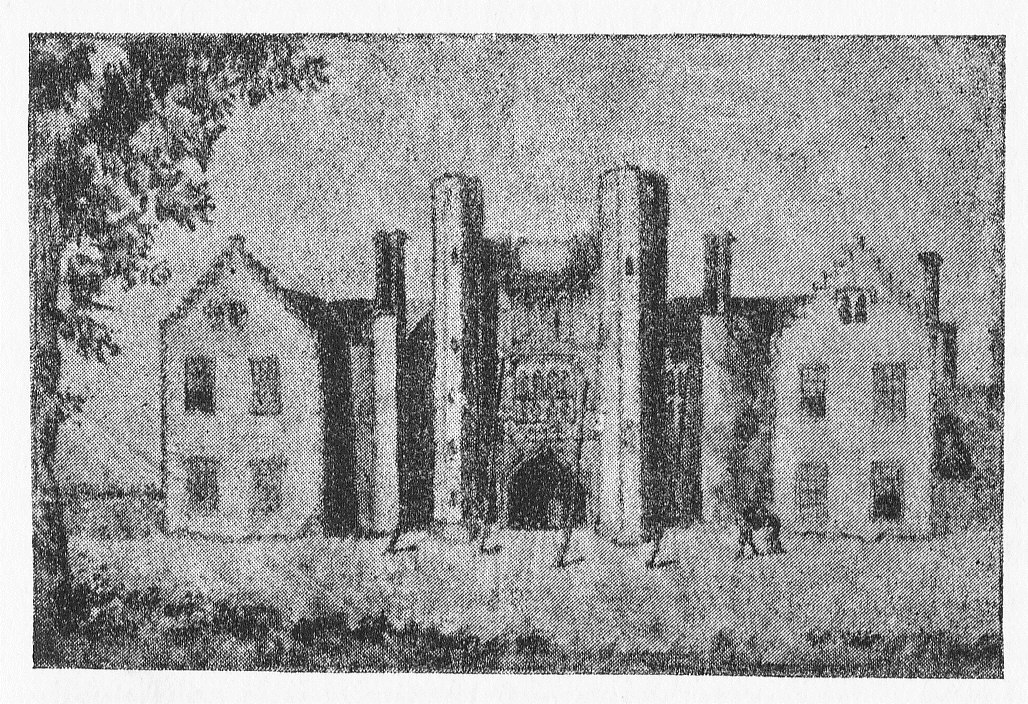
Original north wing containing gatehouse, demolished 1782, drawing made in 1779

The house is built of red brick and was originally of four blocks enclosing a quadrangle exactly 81 ft. 3 ins. square. The northern block or wing was demolished in 1782, giving the house its present open appearance of a U-shape, the two surviving flanking wings forming a courtyard looking to the east. An unusual feature is that, due to the extreme flatness of the site, the entire ground floor of the whole house stands on the exact level of the soil, so that no step exists for entering the house on any side. It is set within a separately listed formal parkland at the end of a long driveway.

== Terracotta elements ==
The decorative elements made from moulded terracotta on the facade are in an Italian Renaissance style. They consist of designs made from 40 to 50 different moulds, most strikingly comprising a panel of two rows of amorini immediately above the entrance door. Such Italianate influence had perhaps never before been seen in English architecture, and is thought to have resulted from designs seen by Weston during his travels on embassies to France, where he might have seen some of the newly built chateaux on the Loire. With very minor exceptions, no stone was used in the building and decoration of Sutton Place, only brick and terracotta. Thus, the bases, doorways, windows, string-courses, labels and other dripstones, parapet, angles, cornices, and finials are all of moulded terracotta. Such usage is only found in two other contemporary English buildings, East Barsham Manor in Norfolk and Layer Marney Tower in Essex. Its use was, however, rapidly abandoned in England, to appear again only in the Victorian era. The terracotta proved very hard-wearing and was described by Harrison in 1899 as "sharp and perfect" in condition. In the 1980s, the terracotta underwent a £12 million refurbishment, involving much replacement, by the specialist firm Hathernware Ceramics Ltd, which used 18 different colour blends of clay to match the original variety of shades. Prior to that, it seems the only new elements were from 1875 when 10 new terracotta mullions and window-frames made by Messrs Blashfield of Stamford, from moulds of existing windows, replaced sash-windows inserted in the 18th century. Two completely new small windows were, at the same time, created from terracotta in the gables of the quadrangle.

Other terracotta decorative elements include framed monograms of "R W", the builder, and reliefs of his rebus of the concave-ended barrel, probably signifying a "waisted-tun". The "tun" was a play on the last syllable of Weston. The concave-ended barrel is sometimes shown between two goose heads, the significance of which is unclear, unless it be the French word Oie plus -"tun". Willam Bolton (d.1532), prior of St Bartholomew's in Smithfield, is also known to have used the rebus of a "tun", as can be seen in his surviving oriel window within the church in the form of a barrel with a bolt of a crossbow passing through vertically. Another recurring terracotta element is a double bunch of grapes, thought by some to represent hops. Harrison believes the story of Weston having been "the King's brewer" unfounded and "a vulgar story". Similar hop-like bunches of grapes also feature at Layer Marney, and there is no evidence of Lord Marney, captain of the royal bodyguard, having been similarly a brewer.

Terracotta panels

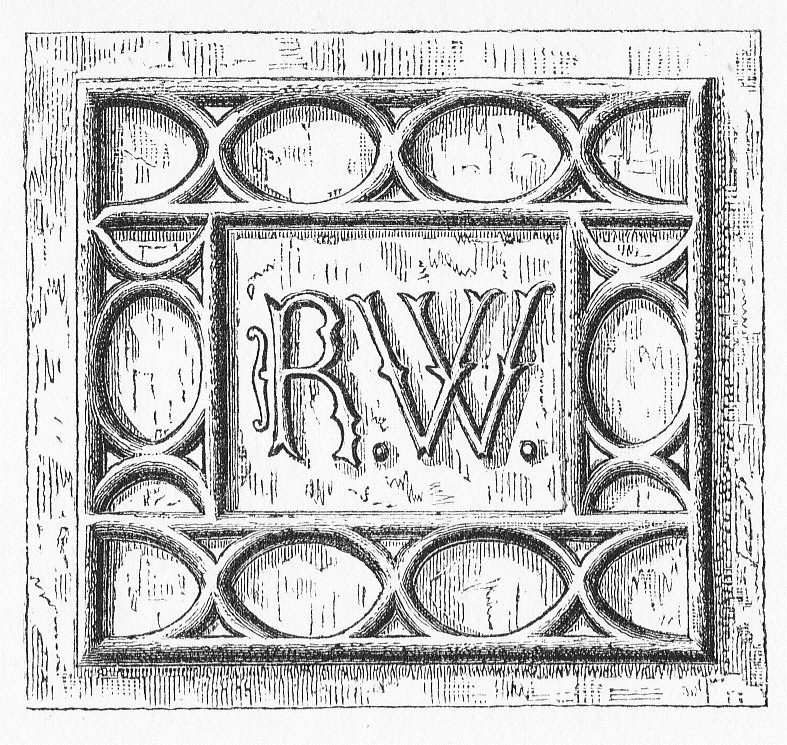
Monogram of Sir Richard Weston

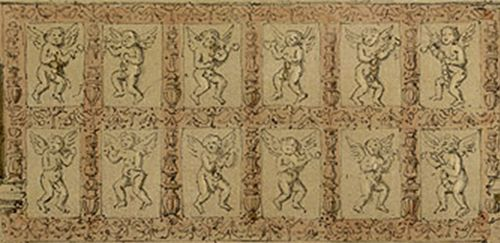
Terracotta amorini above entrance door, detail from 1840 illustration by Nash

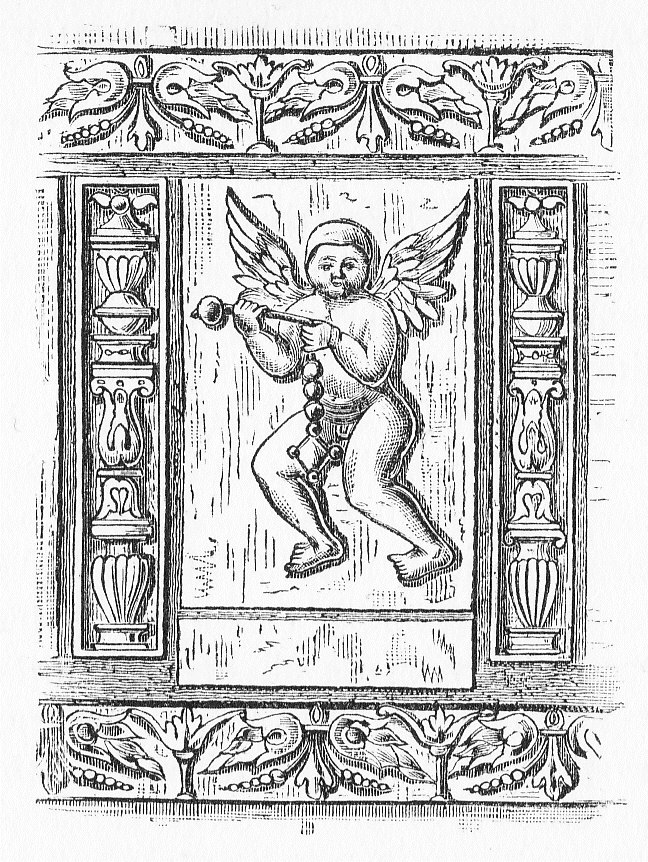
Single amorino, said to be holding rosaries, but perhaps resemble more Steelyard balances

Rebus of Weston, a "waisted-tun", a barrel with concave ends.

== Painted glass ==
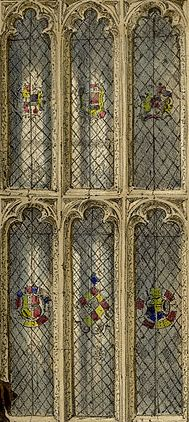
Painted glass at Sutton Place. Detail of ground floor hall window to south of entrance door, illustration by Joseph Nash, c.1840

The hall windows contain fine painted glass, much installed contemporaneously with the building of the house. These consist of shields of arms and other rebuses. There are, in total, 14 windows containing 92 separate lights, each containing a shield or quarry of painted glass. They are of different dates and quality, belonging to three separate epochs, but mostly relating to the builder's family. Some glass predates the house and is believed to have come from the earlier manor house of Sutton. Harrison states certain to be "of extraordinary beauty and rarity"..."of the finest painted glass of the time of Henry VIII". Apart from family arms, the arms of King Richard III and emblems of the Roses, Red and White are also shown; all relate to the Battle of Bosworth at which Edmund Weston, Governor of Guernsey, father of Sir Richard, is thought to have assisted Henry Tudor by providing the use of money, ships or even a contingent of soldiers.

Painted glass panels in the hall of Sutton Place.
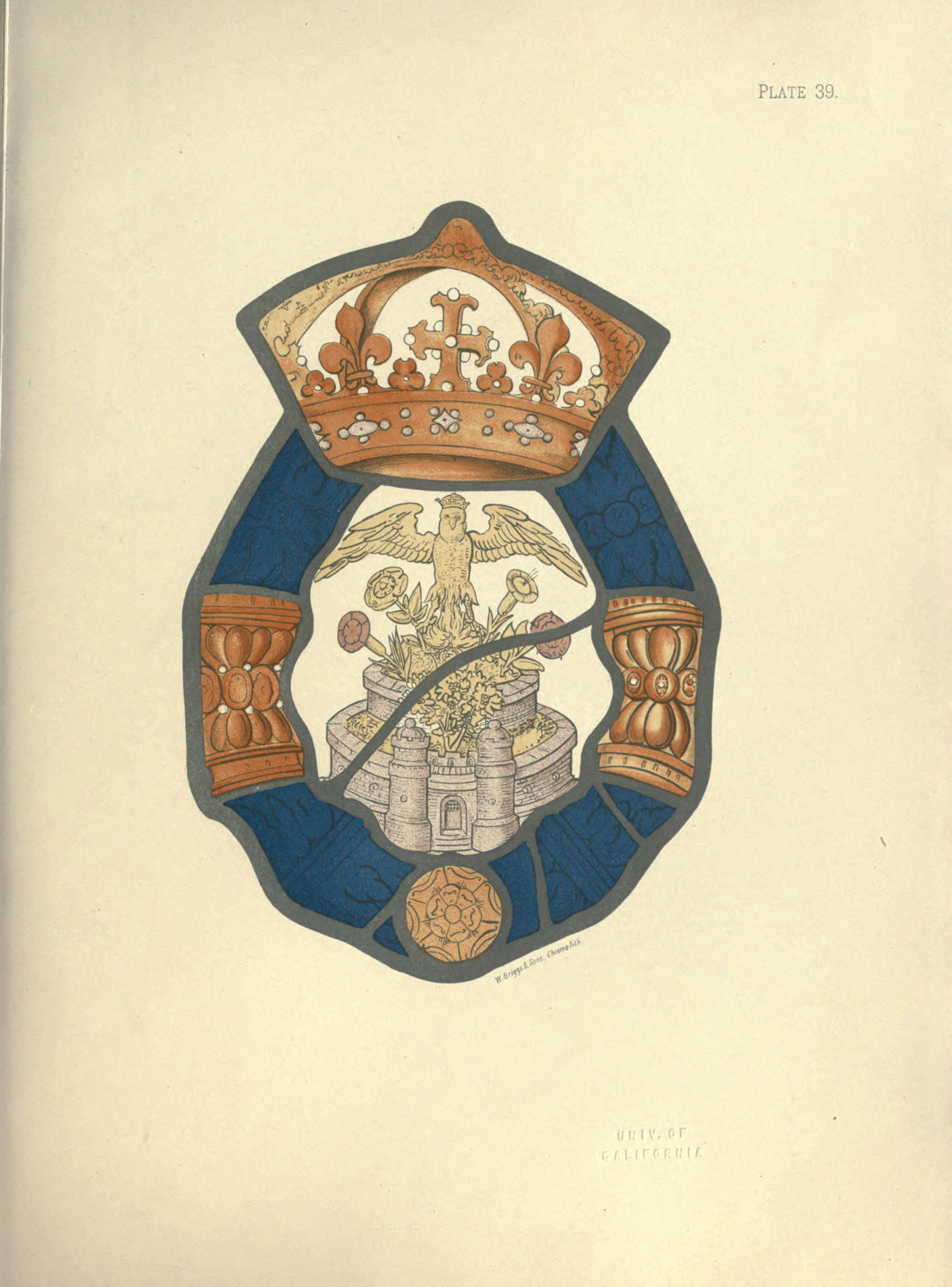
Emblem of Jane Seymour

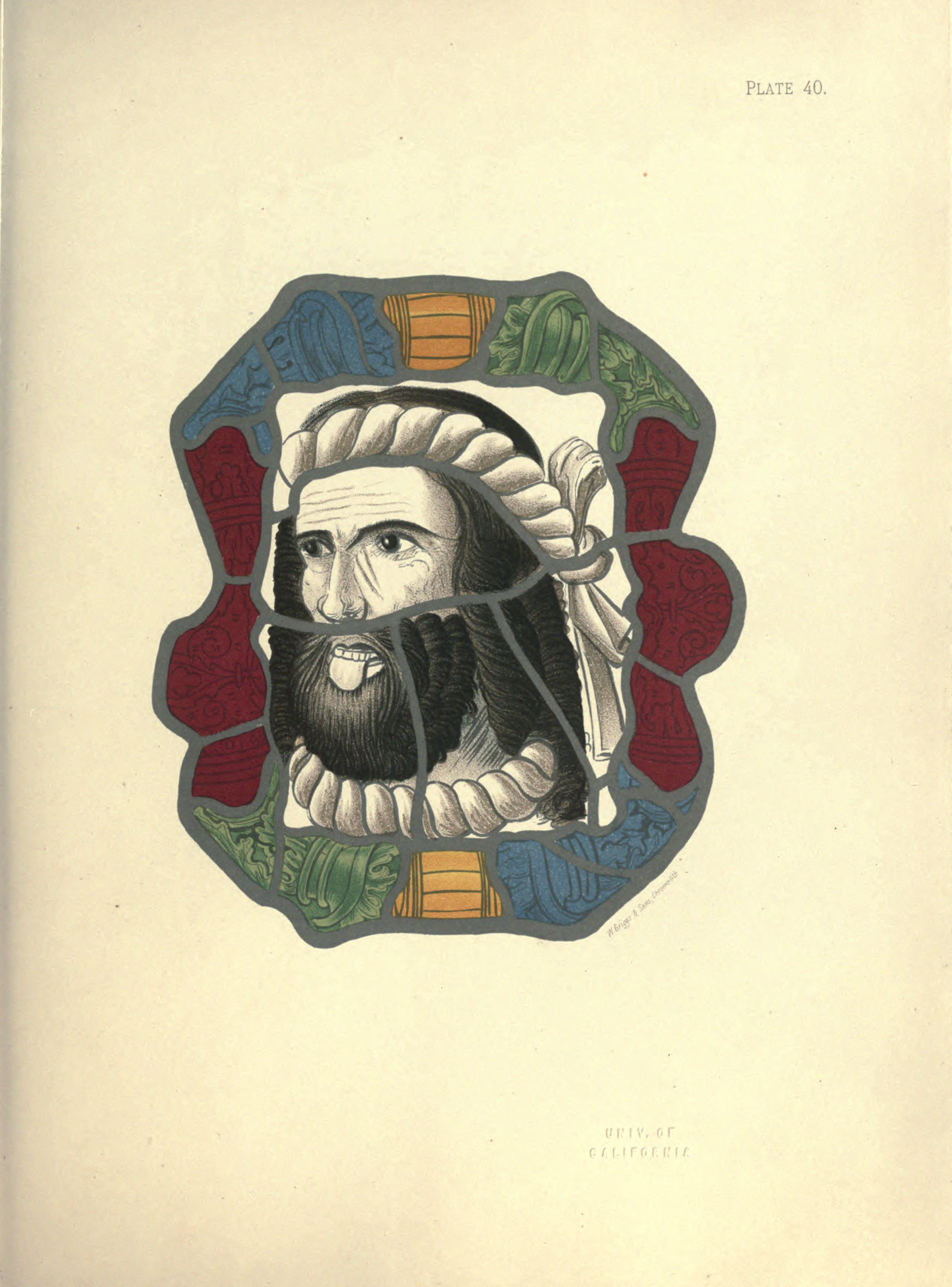
Crest of Sir Richard Weston, 1521

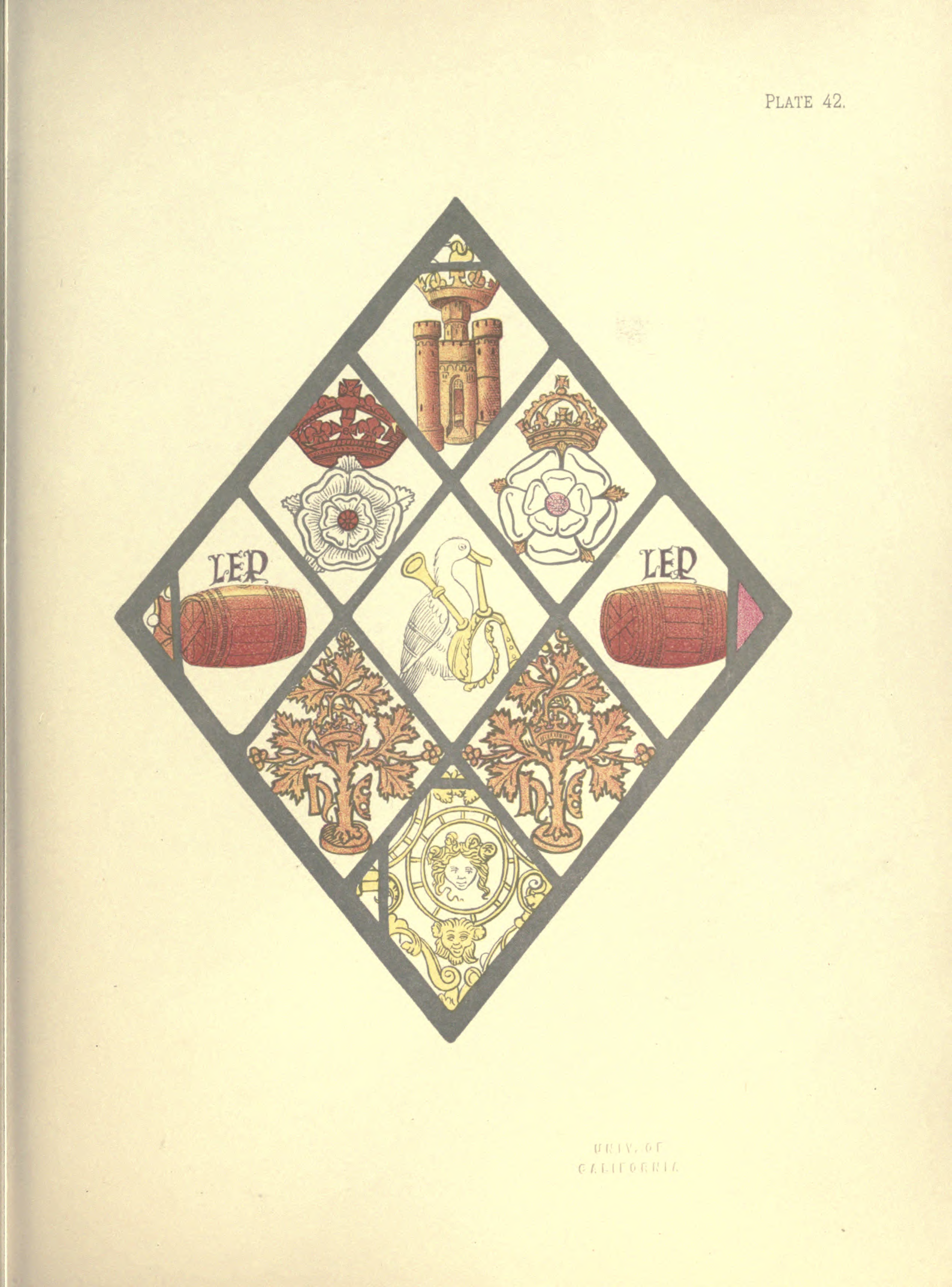
Various Tudor and other Devices

== History ==
Sutton Manor, within which the Tudor mansion is situated, appears in the Domesday Book of 1086 as Sudtone. It was held by Robert Malet. Its Domesday assets were: 3 hides; 1 mill worth 5s, 3 ploughs, 20 acres (81,000 m^{2}) of meadow, woodland worth 25 hogs. It rendered £5. The previous manor house stood about a quarter of a mile from the present house, on the hill now occupied by St Edward's Chapel and Vine Cottage.

Within Sutton Place was once the blood-stained ruff of St Thomas More and a crystal pomegranate that once belonged to Queen Catherine of Aragon. The pomegranate emblem of the Queen features as a decoration in several places within the house, which suggested to Harrison that Weston certainly built the house before she was divorced by Henry VIII in 1533, and possibly before 1527 when it would have been known by his courtiers, such as Weston, that the King had turned his affections away from Catherine towards Anne Boleyn.

Queen Elizabeth visited Sutton Place on 26 September 1591 after staying at Farnham Castle.

== Ownership ==
Sutton Place remained in the Weston family and families related to it by marriage until 1919, although let out for part of the time. The family was recusant from Tudor times, which precluded it from taking an active part in public life. Successive occupants thus lived as retiring country gentlemen of reduced means, which meant that the house escaped remodelling through the ages.

Sir Richard Weston (d. 1541) was granted the manor by Henry VIII on 17 May 1521. By the time of his grandson, Sir Henry Weston, the Weston family's fortunes waned somewhat, and they lived more at Clandon. Henry's grandson, Sir Richard Weston (1591–1652), was a canal builder and pioneering agriculturalist, and the last prominent member of the Weston family in English public life. The last of the Westons was Melior Mary Weston (1703–1782), a spinster, last of the Weston name. She bequeathed all her estates to her very distant cousin, John Webbe, on condition that he adopted the name and arms of Weston. John Webbe-Weston erected a marble tablet to her memory in Holy Trinity Church, Guildford where she was buried in the Weston Chapel built by Sir Richard Weston the founder. In 1782, the year he inherited Sutton Place, he demolished the dilapidated gatehouse wing He completed renovations in 1784, having rejected proposals of the architect Bonomi to remodel the house in an Italianate or neo-classical style. His second son, Thomas (d. 1857), was the last of this family, having married but died without issue.

In 1857, Sutton Place was inherited by John Webbe-Weston's grandson Francis Henry Salvin (d. 1904), of Croxdale Hall, County Durham, an authority on falconry, and author, with William Brodrick, of Falconry in the British Isles (1855). He leased the house out to tenants, including the family of the historian Frederic Harrison, who wrote the definitive history of Sutton Place. The Harrison family spent much care and money on preserving the house. From 1900, the tenant was Alfred Harmsworth, 1st Viscount Northcliffe (d. 1922)

On the death of Francis Salvin in 1904, the estate passed to his niece's son Philip Witham (1842–1921), a solicitor. Witham had never held vacant possession of Sutton Place and sold it on the expiry of the Northcliffe tenancy in 1918. His wife Louise died in 1945; in July that year, the Weston family estate papers were presented to Surrey Archives by Mrs D. Wolseley, of Guildford.

== Weston Chapel, Holy Trinity Church, Guildford ==
The "Weston Chapel" stands attached to the south side of Holy Trinity Church, Guildford. Its external walls are of a decorative chequerboard pattern of flint and freestone squares. It was built c.1540 by Richard Weston (1465–1541) of nearby Sutton Place, primarily as his intended burial place, as his will, dated 15 May 1541, directs that his body be:

"buryed in the P'yshe Churche of the Holy Trinitye with in the Town of Guldforde in a Chapell which I have caused to be made for the same iyntent"

The Chantry established and funded by Weston is listed in the "Survey of Chantry Lands, Surrey" made between 1546 and 1548 as part of the administering of the dissolution of the monasteries as being:

"For the mayneteyninge of one priest and one yerely obite for the terme of xx ti (i.e.20) yeares begyninge the xx th day of June in the xxxii yere (1541) of the reigne of our late sovereign lorde Kinge Henry the eight. The incumbent whereof is Anthony Cawsey clerke of the age of l (i.e.50) yeres...which said chauntrey and obite are worth lands and tenements by the yere x li (i.e. £20) whereof to the pore xxvii s iiii d. (i.e. 27 shillings & 4 pence) and so remayneth clere viii li iiii d (i.e. £8 4d) plate parcel gilt viii oz di. Qrt. xlii s iii d Ornamentes x li."

The Weston family maintained their Catholic faith throughout the English Reformation and beyond, which was a great sacrifice for them as it prevented them from holding public office and brought much suspicion on them from government officials throughout the ages. The freehold of the Weston Chapel was retained by descendants of the Weston family until 2005, when the trustees of the Weston Estate granted it to the main Protestant Church of Holy Trinity, to which it has been physically attached since 1763. Part of the arrangement was that a Catholic mass be held in the Chapel at least annually. There are three surviving Weston monuments in the chapel. Two are wall tablets, the earliest of which commemorates Melior Mary Weston (d.1782) of Sutton Place, the last direct descendant of the founder and only child and sole heiress of John II Weston (d.1730) and Elizabeth Gage, sister of Thomas Gage, 1st Viscount Gage. The tablet was erected by her grateful distant Catholic cousin John Webbe-Weston (d.1823) to whom she bequeathed all her estates, including Sutton Place. The other tablet is for Elizabeth Lawson, who died in 1791, aged 34, first wife of John Webbe-Weston.

The other Weston Monument, which once stood in the centre of the Weston Chapel but now stands in the west porch of the main church, is the chest tomb of Anne Pickering (d.1582), wife of Sir Francis Weston the only son of the founder who was executed in 1536, aged only 25, for supposed adultery with Queen Anne Boleyn. Although she remarried, she expressed the wish in her will to be buried near her first father-in-law. Francis, having been beheaded in the Tower of London, was buried in an unmarked tomb within the precincts of the Tower. The effigy is of a recumbent woman wearing a ruff and lies on a chest tomb sculpted with skulls showing behind a grille.

=== 1918–present ===
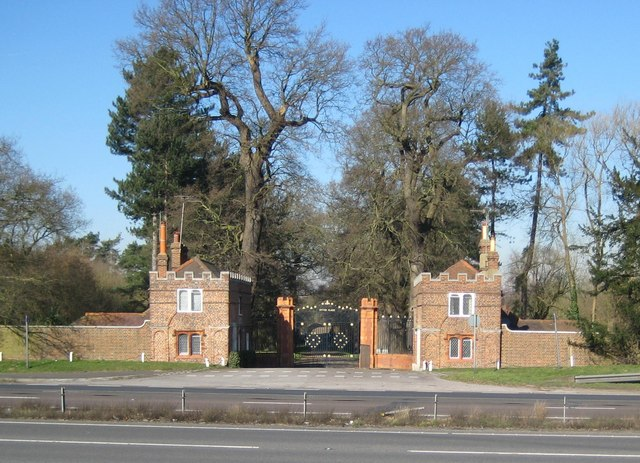
East Lodge gates, Sutton Place, on the north side of the A3 road.

- George Sutherland-Leveson-Gower, 5th Duke of Sutherland (d. 1963). (Note: He was the first person unrelated to the Weston family to own Sutton Place since its building c. 1525, having purchased it in 1918 from Philip Witham.) He modernised the interior.
- J. Paul Getty, who purchased the estate in 1959 for around $840,000, was then, or shortly thereafter, the world's richest private citizen. His choice of Sutton Place for his principal residence made the property well known. He adopted a very low personal profile locally, being occasionally seen by Sutton Green villagers driving through in a very old model Cadillac coupé. For the 2017 film All the Money in the World, about the kidnapping of Getty's grandson John Paul Getty III, scenes set at Sutton Place were filmed at Hatfield House.
- Stanley J. Seeger. Sutton Place was sold in 1980, after Getty's death in 1976, by his Getty Oil Corporation, for £8 million, to a company owned by Stanley J. Seeger who established the Sutton Place Heritage Trust to maintain the property. He was an American heir to a family fortune from lumber, petroleum, and other sources, who had begun collecting art whilst a student at Princeton University. He was a patron of arts and educational charities and endowed a chair of Hellenic studies at Princeton University. He is never known to have given an interview. He redecorated Sutton Place and hung some of his modern paintings there including a Bacon triptych. In the early 1980s he commissioned landscape architect Sir Geoffrey Jellicoe to relandscape the park and gardens. Although Seeger stated he spent almost £1m a year on maintaining the house, he rarely lived there.
- Frederick R. Koch. After 10 years, Seeger sold it to another American art collector, Frederick R. Koch, who set up the Sutton Place Foundation, and in his turn redecorated the house and used it to display his own art collection to the public. According to The Guardian he is said never to have spent a night under its roof and to have sold it for £32m in 1999. In January 2003, it was offered for sale at £25m. The estate at that time comprised 21 properties, including the 18-bedroom Lady Grove Farmhouse.
- The estate, now held by a discretionary irrevocable family trust created by Alisher Usmanov, a Russian oligarch was reportedly bought for less than the £25m originally asked for in 2004. Some of the properties with part of the estate land have now been sold. Lady Grove Farmhouse has been redeveloped into luxury housing. The interiors of Sutton Place House underwent extensive renovation and improvements for its new owner from 2007 to 2009.

== Portraits of owners ==
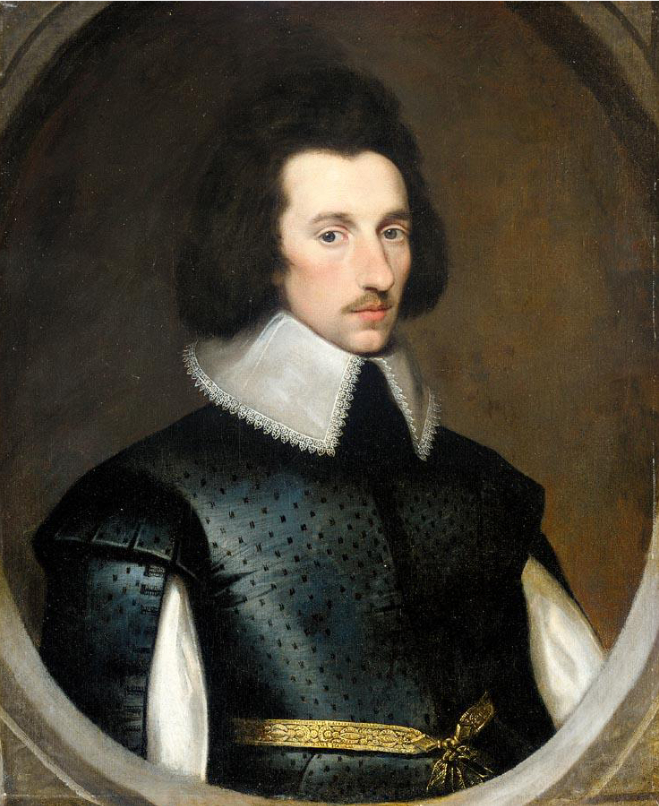
Portrait of Sir Richard III Weston (d. 1652), attributed to Cornelis de Neve, c. 1630

Portrait of John II Weston (d. 1730), by Jonathan Richardson

Portrait of Melior Mary Weston (d. 1782), by Jonathan Richardson. This painting hung at Sutton Place in 1893, described by Harrison as "in the style of Kneller".

Thomas Webbe (d. 1780), linen draper of Covent Garden, father of John Webbe-Weston. Portrait by circle of Joseph Highmore (1692–1780). This portrait was hanging at Sutton Place in 1893.

Portrait of Anne Tancred, wife of Thomas Webbe & mother of John Webbe-Weston. By circle of Joseph Highmore (1692–1780). This portrait was hanging at Sutton Place in 1893.

Portrait of John Webbe-Weston (d. 1823), pastel by John Russell, a painter born in nearby Guildford in 1745. This portrait hung at Sutton Place in 1893.

Portrait of Capt. John Joseph II Webbe-Weston (killed in action 1849). By circle of Michael Angelo Hayes

== St Edward the Confessor Church ==
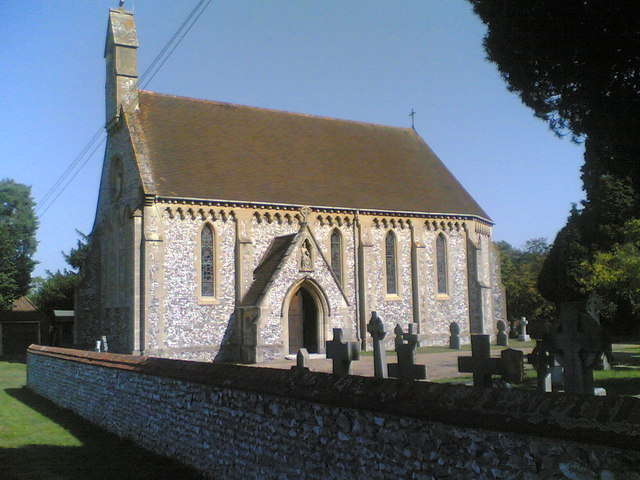
Church entrance

Within the grounds of Sutton Place is St Edward the Confessor Church. It is a Roman Catholic Parish church. It was built in 1875 in the early English Gothic style and is a Grade II listed building.

The architect was Charles Alban Buckler, the son of John Chessell Buckler, and is buried in the cemetery that surrounds the church. He also designed the Church of St Thomas of Canterbury and English Martyrs, St Leonards-on-Sea, St Peter's Church, Shoreham-by-Sea, St Francis of Assisi's Church in Midhurst, St Richard's Church in Slindon, most of St Dominic's Priory Church in Haverstock Hill, and parts of Arundel Castle.

The church was opened on 27 September 1876. In 1911, the parish priest was Arthur Hinsley (who later became the Archbishop of Westminster and a cardinal). While he was priest, the reredos, which was designed by Frederick Walters and had glass by Hugh Ray Easton, was added to the church. Around that time, windows designed by Franz Mayer & Co. and Hardman & Co. were also installed. On 31 May 1950, the church was consecrated by the Bishop of Southwark, Cyril Cowderoy.

== Notes and references ==
Notes

== Sources ==
- Harrison, Frederic. Annals of an Old Manor House: Sutton Place, Guildford. London, 1899 (The author's family held the lease of Sutton Place and resided there from 1874 to post 1899)archive.org on-line text
- Victoria County History, Surrey, vol.3, 1911, Woking parish, Sutton Manor, pp.381-390
- Sutton Place, notes by Philip Arnold
- The Weston Chapel, www.holytrinityguildford.org.uk
- Sutton Place & St Edward's Church, notes by Jim Miller, 2002
