= St. Dominic's Cathedral =

St. Dominic's Cathedral may refer to:

- St. Dominic Cathedral, Cobán, in Guatemala
- Saint Dominic's Cathedral, Fuzhou, in China
- St. Dominic Cathedral, Moquegua, in Peru

== See also ==
- St. Dominic's Church (disambiguation)
