= Edward Dendy =

Edward Dendy may refer to:

- Edward Dendy (regicide) (1613–1674), serjeant-at-arms who took an active part in the regicide of Charles I
- Edward Stephen Dendy (1812–1864), long-serving officer of arms at the College of Arms
