= St. Dominic's Church =

St. Dominic's Church, Church of St. Dominick, and variations, may refer to:

== England ==
- St Dominic's Priory Church, Camden, London NW5
- St Dominic's Church, Newcastle

== United States ==
- St. Dominic Church in San Francisco, California
- St. Dominic's Church (Denver, Colorado), listed on the NRHP in Colorado
- St. Dominic Catholic Church (Miami, FL), Florida
- St. Dominic's Catholic Church, in Springfield, Kentucky, listed on the NRHP in Kentucky
- St. Dominic's Church (Portland, Maine)
- St. Dominic's Church (Bronx), New York City
- St. Dominic Roman Catholic Church (Oyster Bay, New York), in Oyster Bay, New York
- St. Dominic Catholic Church (Washington, D.C.)

== Other places ==
- Saint-Dominique Church (Quebec City), Canada
- Basilica of Saint Dominic, Bologna, Italy
- St. Dominic's Church, Macau
- Basilica of St Dominic, Valletta, Malta
- St. Dominic's Church, Bahawalpur, Pakistan
- St. Dominic Parish Church, in Santo Domingo, Nueva Ecija, Philippines

== See also ==
- St. Dominic's Cathedral (disambiguation)
