= Santo Domingo Cathedral =

Santo Domingo Cathedral may refer to:

- Basilica Cathedral of Santa María la Menor, Santo Domingo, Dominican Republic
- Episcopal Cathedral of the Epiphany-Union Church of Santo Domingo, Dominican Republic
- Cathedral of the Roman Catholic Diocese of Santo Domingo in Ecuador
- Cobán Cathedral (Catedral de Santo Domingo de Guzmán), Guatemala
- Basco Cathedral, Philippines, also known as Santo Domingo
- Bayombong Cathedral (Santo Domingo de Guzman Cathedral), Nueva Vizcaya, Philippines
- Santo Domingo de la Calzada Cathedral, Spain
