= Charles Alban Buckler =

English architect and topographer (1825–1905)

- Coat of arms
- Born: 1825
- Died: 1905 (aged 79–80)
- Occupation: Architect
- Parent: John Chessell Buckler (father)
- Buildings: Arundel Castle

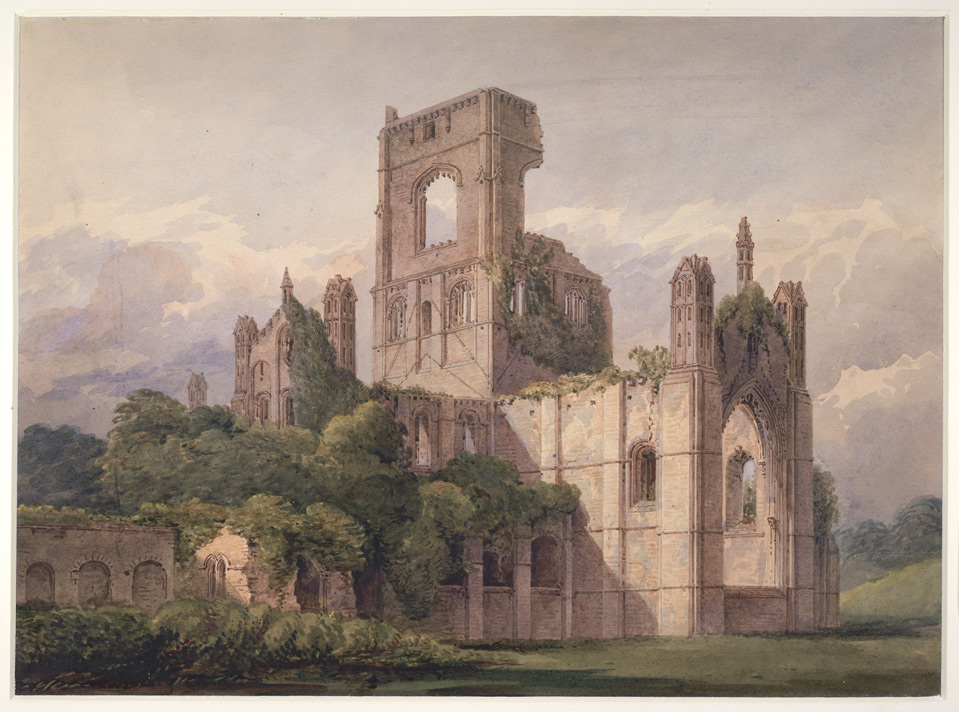
Kirkstall Abbey, painting by Charles Alban Buckler, 1850

Charles Alban Buckler (1825–1905) was an English author, topographer, architect, artist and officer of arms. According to Historic England, he "became one of the most distinguished of the early to mid-Victorian Catholic architects." In the field of heraldry he was the Surrey Herald Extraordinary.

== Life ==
=== Family ===
Charles Alban Buckler was born in 1824. He was born into Buckler dynasty of architects and was the son of the noted architect John Chessell Buckler. He grandfather was John Buckler. Since 2013, the Buckler family of architects and topographical artists has been the subject of a research project hosted by the Institute for the History and Theory of Architecture at ETH Zurich.

=== Career ===
He was a student of medieval art and architecture. He and his father John Chessell Buckler worked together writing architecture books such as A History of the Architecture of the Abbey Church of St Alban in 1847. In 1844, Charles Buckler converted to Catholicism and went on to design many Catholic churches in England. When his father died in 1851, Charles Buckler was one of six surviving children. In the 1870s, he was commissioned by Henry Fitzalan-Howard, 15th Duke of Norfolk to re-build Arundel Castle. The Duke of Norfolk, as Earl Marshal, the head and chief of the College of Arms, nominated Buckler to be Surrey Herald Extraordinary. On 16 July 1880, his nomination was accepted by Queen Victoria. As both an author and editor he was responsible for numerous literary works about history, architecture and heraldry. In addition, he was an artist who painted watercolours of such places as Kirkstall Abbey. He died in 1905 and is buried in the churchyard of St Edward the Confessor Church in Sutton Park, a church which he himself designed.

== Architectural works ==
The Catholic churches Buckler built include:

- Immaculate Conception Church, Stroud, 1857.
- St Benedict's Church, Atherstone, 1859.
- St Mary's Church, Shifnal, 1860.
- St Dominic's Priory Church, Haverstock Hill, 1863.
- St Mary's Church, East Hendred, 1863.
- St Philip's Church, Shipston-on-Stour, 1864.
- St Richard of Chichester Church, Slindon, 1865.
- St Edward's Church, Windsor, 1867.
- Our Lady of Mount Carmel and St Joseph Church, Battersea Park, 1869.
- St Francis of Assisi Church, Midhurst, 1869.
- St Aloysius Church, Folkestone, 1869.
- St Ignatius of Loyola Church, Sunbury-on-Thames, 1869.
- St Thomas of Canterbury Chapel, Exton Hall, 1869.
- Sacred Heart Church, Camberwell, 1872.
- Our Lady of Mount Carmel Chapel, Lilystone Hall, Stock, 1875.
- St Edward the Confessor Church, Sutton Park, 1876.
- Immaculate Heart of St Mary and St Dominic Church, Homerton, 1875-1883.
- Our Lady Immaculate and St Philip Neri Church, Kirtling, 1877.
- St Richard and St Hubert Church, Hadzor, 1878.
- Holy Cross Priory, Leicester, 1879 (enlarged).
- Church of St Thomas of Canterbury and English Martyrs, St Leonards-on-Sea, 1889.

== Literary works ==
His written works include:

- W. Wallen, C. A. Buckler et al Two essays elucidating the geometrical principals of Gothic architecture : read before the Geological and Polytechnic Society of the West Riding of Yorkshire, 23 Sep, and 2 December 1841
- J. C. Buckler and C. A. Buckler, Remarks upon wayside chapels : with observations on the architecture and present state of the chantry on Wakefield Bridge, 1843.
- J. C. Buckler and C. A. Buckler, A history of the architecture of the abbey church of St. Alban : with special reference to the Norman structure. 1847.
- C. A. Buckler, Notes on the churches of the Friars Preachers, 1862.
- C. A. Buckler, The cathedral, or abbey church of Iona. A series of drawings, and descriptive letterpress of the ruins by Charles Alban Buckler, 1866.
- C. A. Buckler, Bucleriana : notices of the family of Buckler, 1886.
- C. A. Buckler, Emblazoned pedigree of the family of Jones, afterwards Herbert, of Treowen and Llanarth Court, Monmouth County : extracted from the records of the College of Arms, London, 1886–1901.
- C. A. Buckler, Design model for a baldachino for the Roman Catholic (Cathedral) Church of Our Lady & Saint Philip, Arundel, West Sussex, for the 15th Duke of Norfolk, 1890.

== Gallery ==
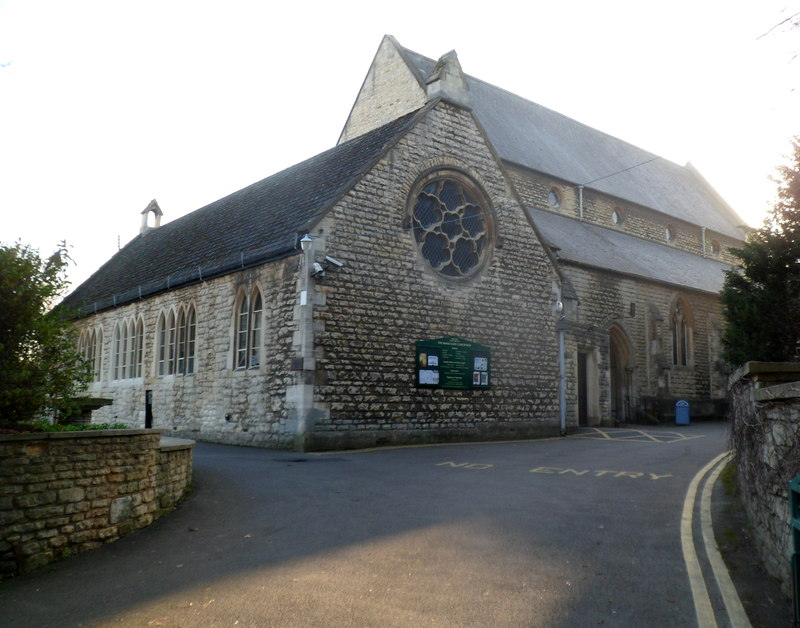
Immaculate Conception Church, Stroud

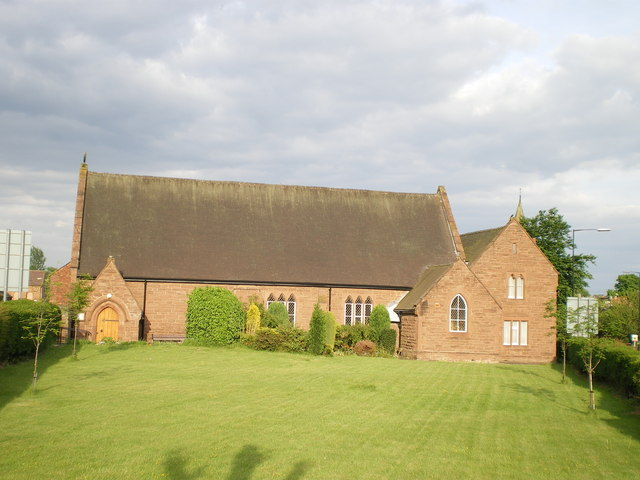
St Mary's Church, Shifnal

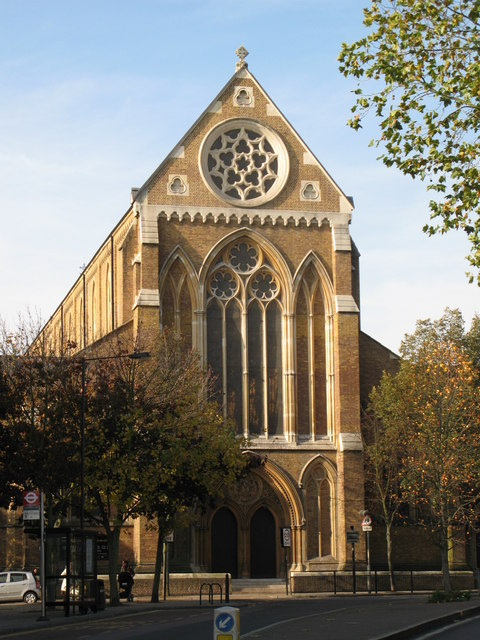
St Dominic's Church, Haverstock Hill

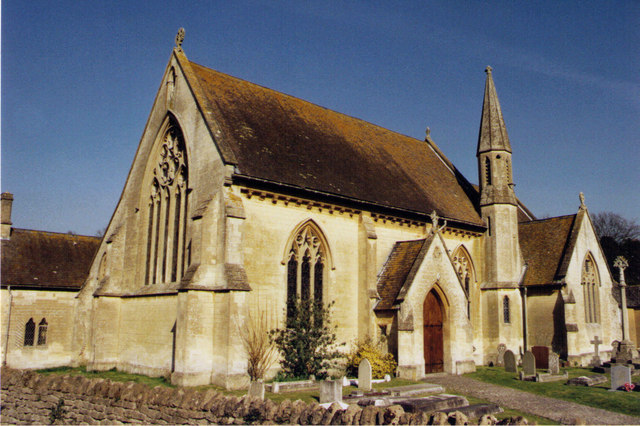
St Mary's Church, East Hendred

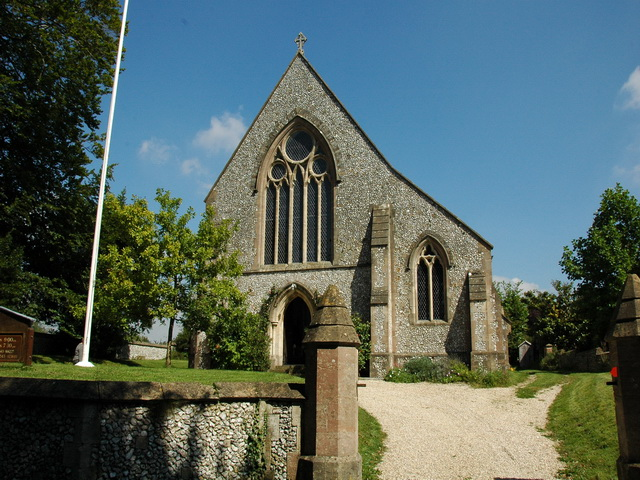
St Richard's Church, Slindon

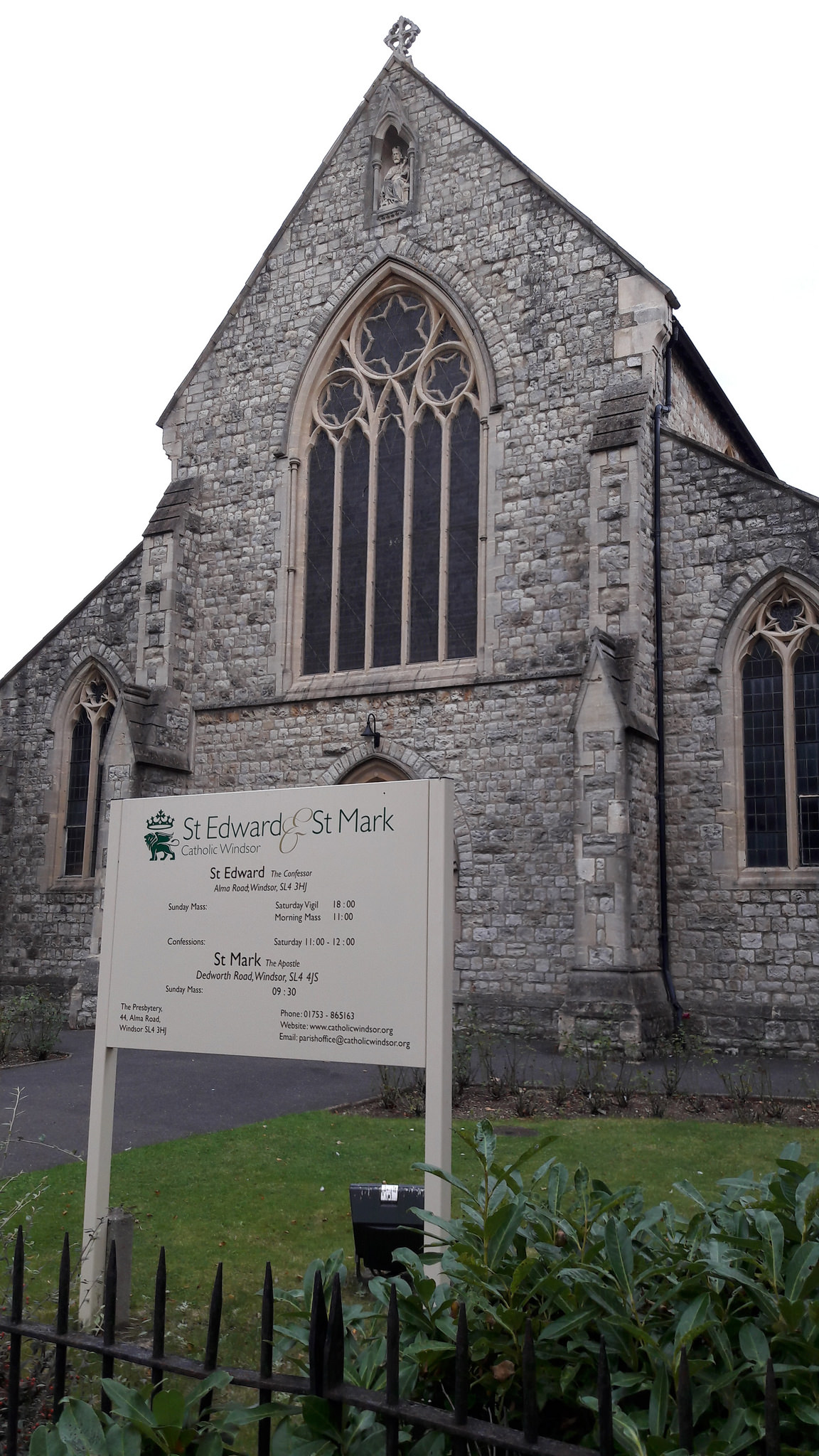
St Edward's Church, Windsor

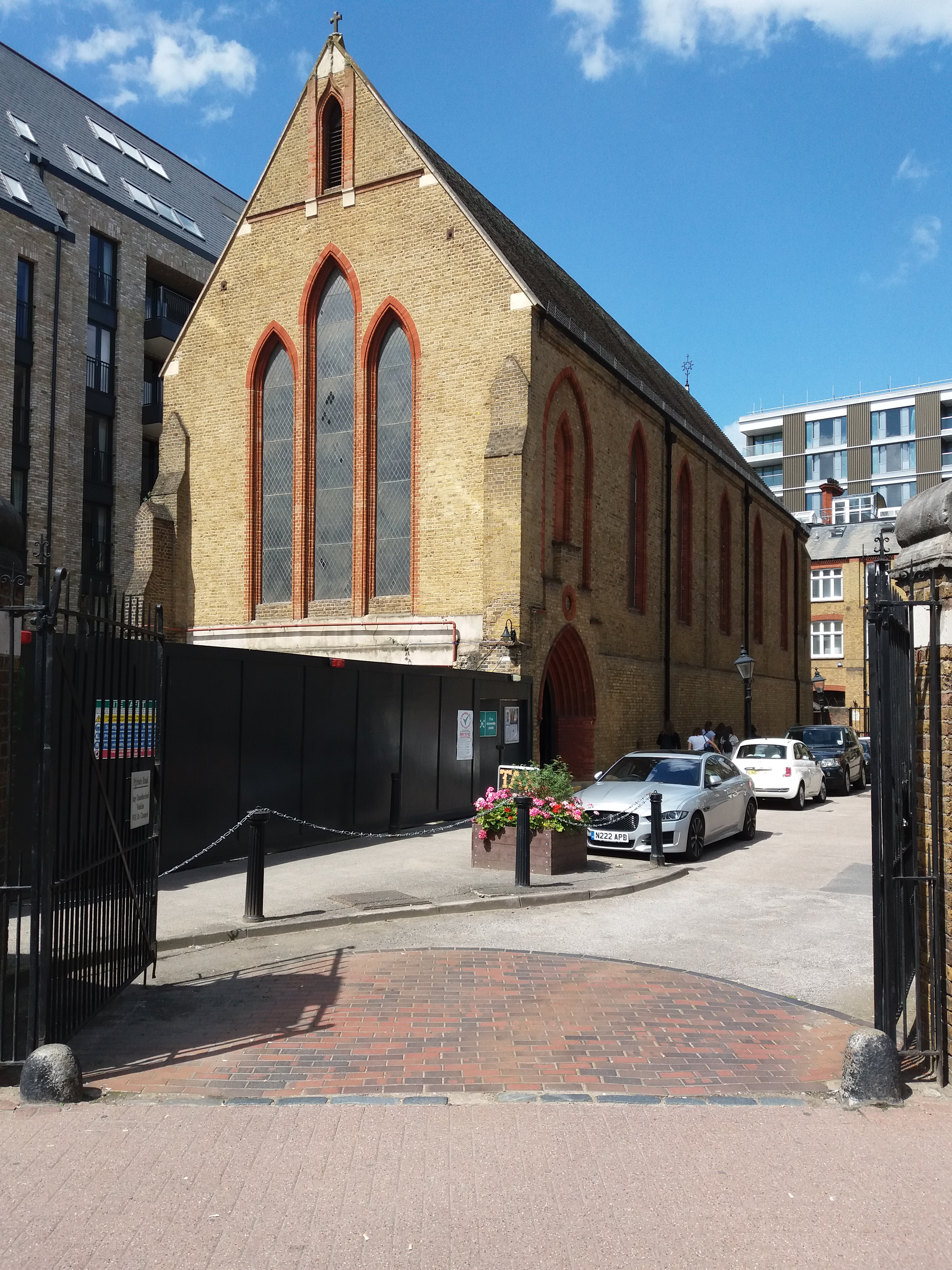
Our Lady of Mount Carmel and St Joseph Church, Battersea Park

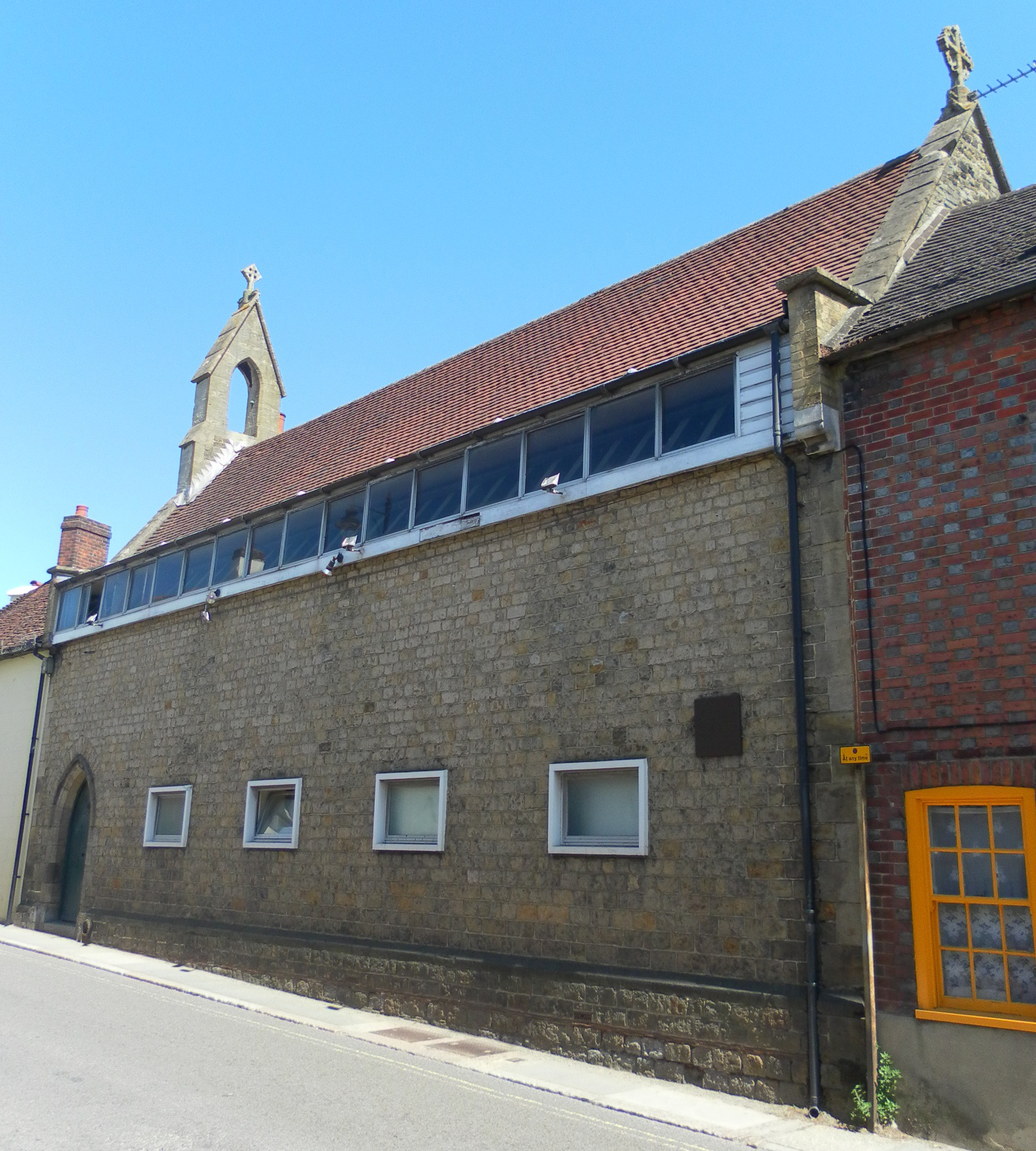
St Francis of Assisi Church, Midhurst

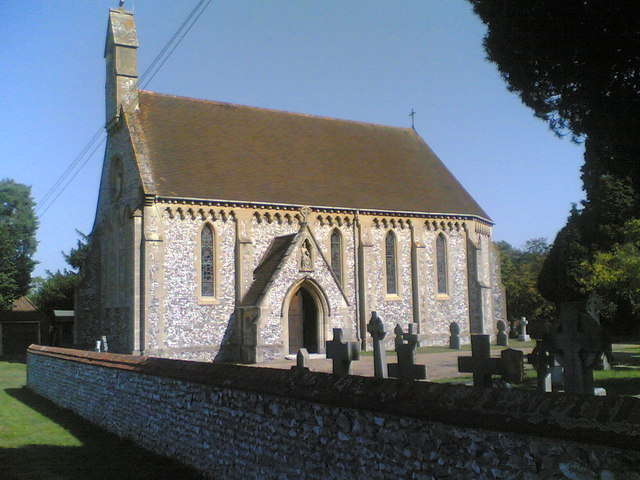
St Edward The Confessor Church, Sutton Park

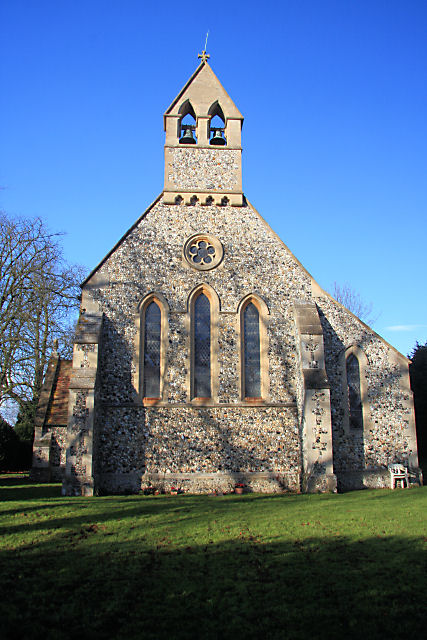
Our Lady Immaculate and St Philip Neri Church, Kirtling

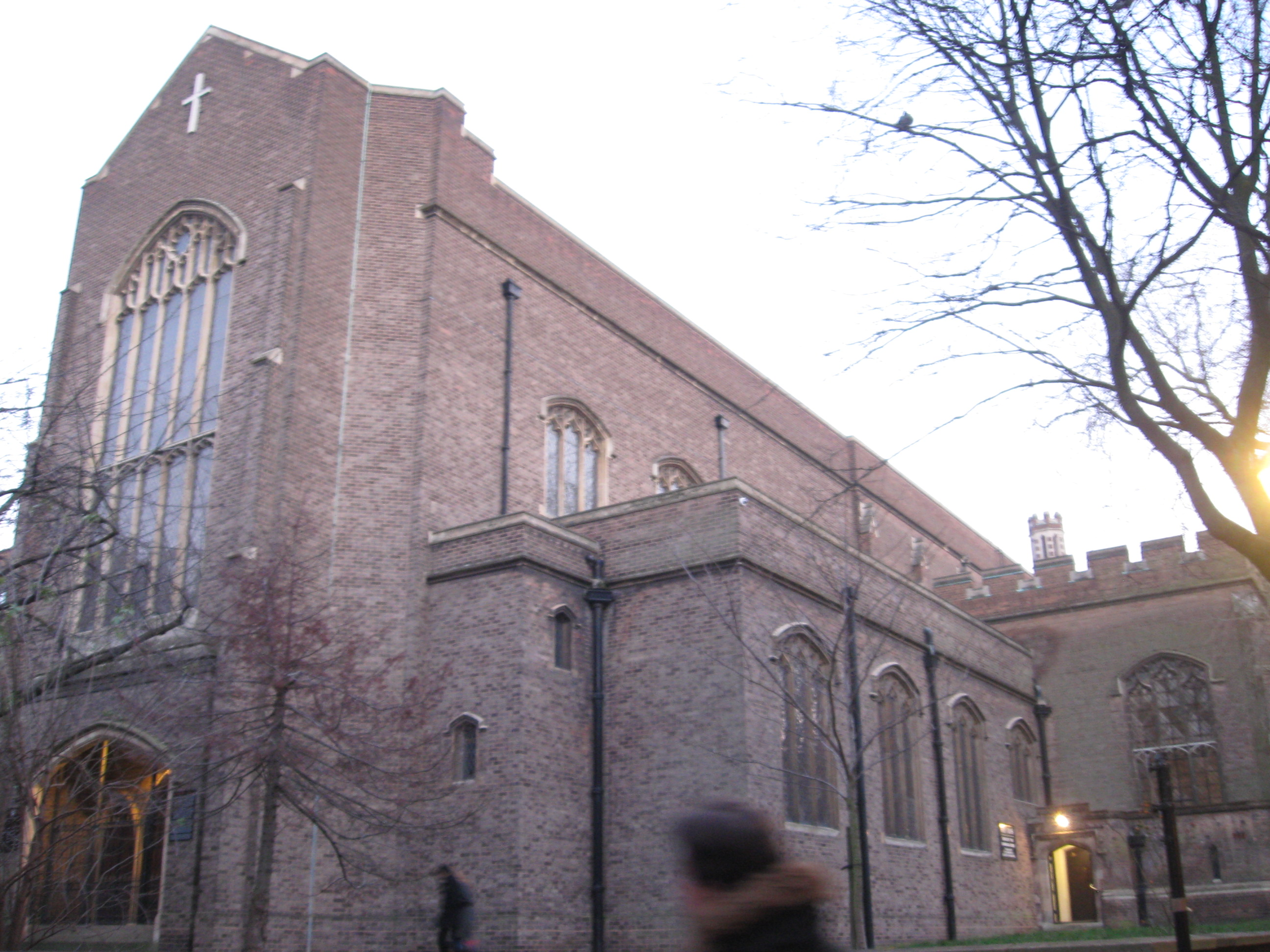
Holy Cross Church, Leicester

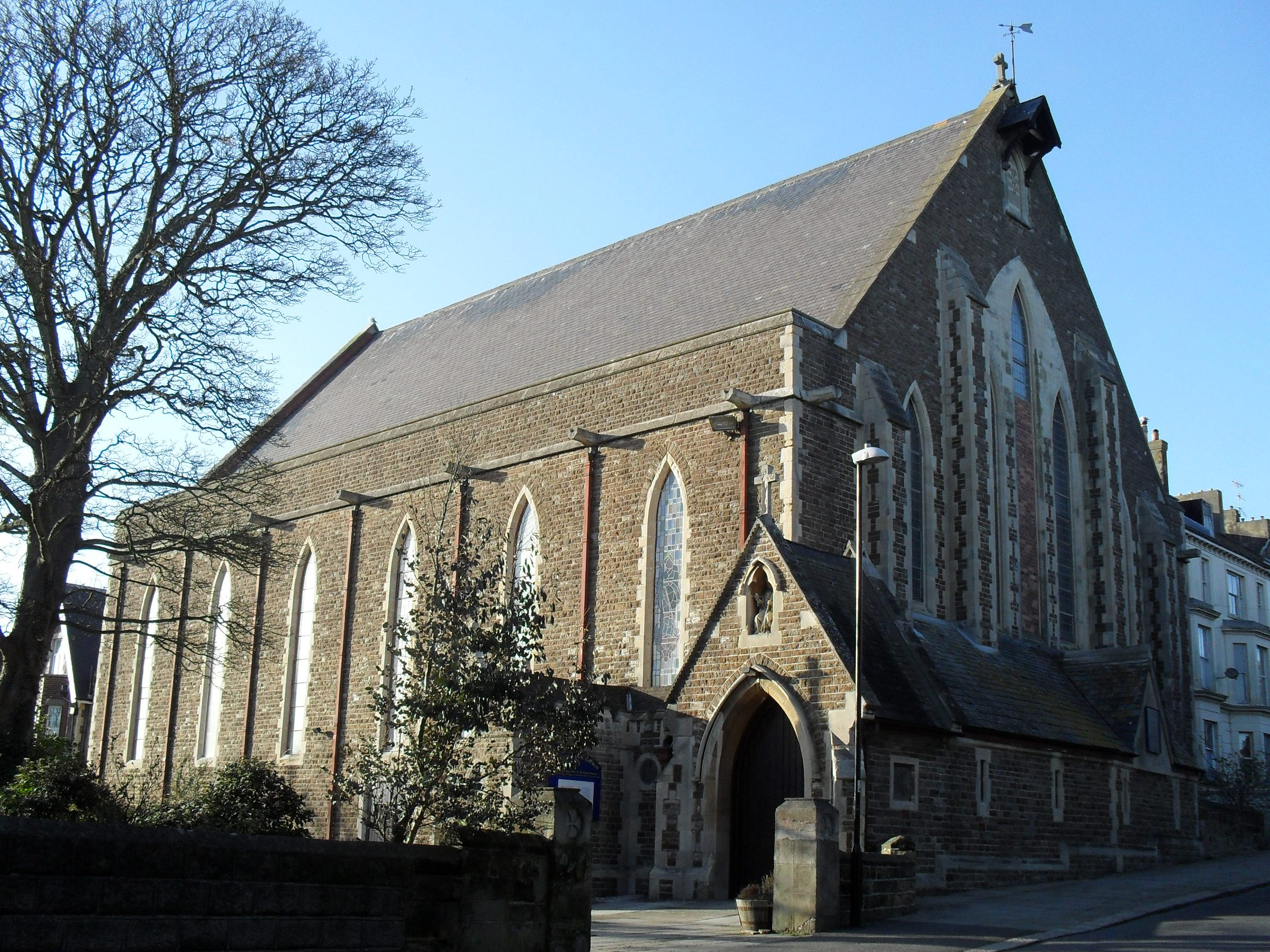
Church of St Thomas of Canterbury and English Martyrs, St Leonards

== See also ==
- John Buckler (artist)
