= Surrey Herald Extraordinary =

- The heraldic badge of Surrey Herald of Arms Extraordinary
- Heraldic tradition: Gallo-British
- Jurisdiction: England, Wales and Northern Ireland
- Governing body: College of Arms

Surrey Herald of Arms Extraordinary was an English officer of arms. Though an officer of the crown, Surrey Herald Extraordinary was not a member of the corporation of the College of Arms in London. This office was created in 1856 and first held by Edward Stephen Dendy. The badge of office was assigned in 1981. The badge is blazoned Within a representation of a Herald's Collar of SS Argent a Tabard chequy Or and Azure. These were the arms of John de Warenne, Earl of Surrey in the late thirteenth century, from whom the earldom descended through the Fitzalans to the Howard dukes of Norfolk and earls marshal.

== Holders of the office ==
| Arms | Name | Date of appointment | Ref |
|---|---|---|---|
| | Edward Stephen Dendy | 23 August 1856 | |
| | Charles Alban Buckler | 16 July 1880 | |
| | Sir Walter John George Verco | 1 July 1980 – 10 March 2001 | |
| | Vacant | 10 March 2001 – present | |

== See also ==
- Heraldry
- Herald
- Officer of Arms
