= Edward Stephen Dendy =

Edward Stephen Dendy (24 June 1812 – 15 May 1864) was a long-serving officer of arms at the College of Arms during the nineteenth Century.

He was one of ten children born to Stephen Cooper Dendy and Miramne Dubbins in Horsham, Sussex, England. He was a younger brother to prominent surgeon Walter Cooper Dendy, and one of his sisters, Amelia Dendy, became the wife of Edward Howard Howard-Gibbon. He kept a diary for a number of years that reveals a great deal not only about his daily life and work, but also about his activities with the Howard-Gibbon family.

Edward became an officer in the college when appointed as Rouge Dragon Pursuivant of Arms in Ordinary in 1848. He also served as Surrey Herald Extraordinary in 1856, and was promoted to Chester Herald of Arms in Ordinary in 1859. He assisted Garter King of Arms, Sir Charles Young, on missions to Turkey and Prussia. He was responsible for compiling most of the information up to that time on the long line of Dendy families living in Sussex and adjacent counties. He died on 15 May 1864 in Westminster and was buried in West Norwood Cemetery.

Heraldic offices
Preceded by Thomas King	Rouge Dragon Pursuivant; 1848 – 1859	Succeeded by George Cokayne
Preceded by Walter Blount	Chester Herald; 1859 – 1864	Succeeded by Henry Lane
