= John Buckler (artist) =

British artist (1770–1851)

- Born: 30 November 1770; Calbourne, Isle of Wight, England
- Died: 6 December 1851 (aged 81); Newington, London, England
- Children: John Chessell Buckler (son)
- Relatives: Charles Alban Buckler (grandson)

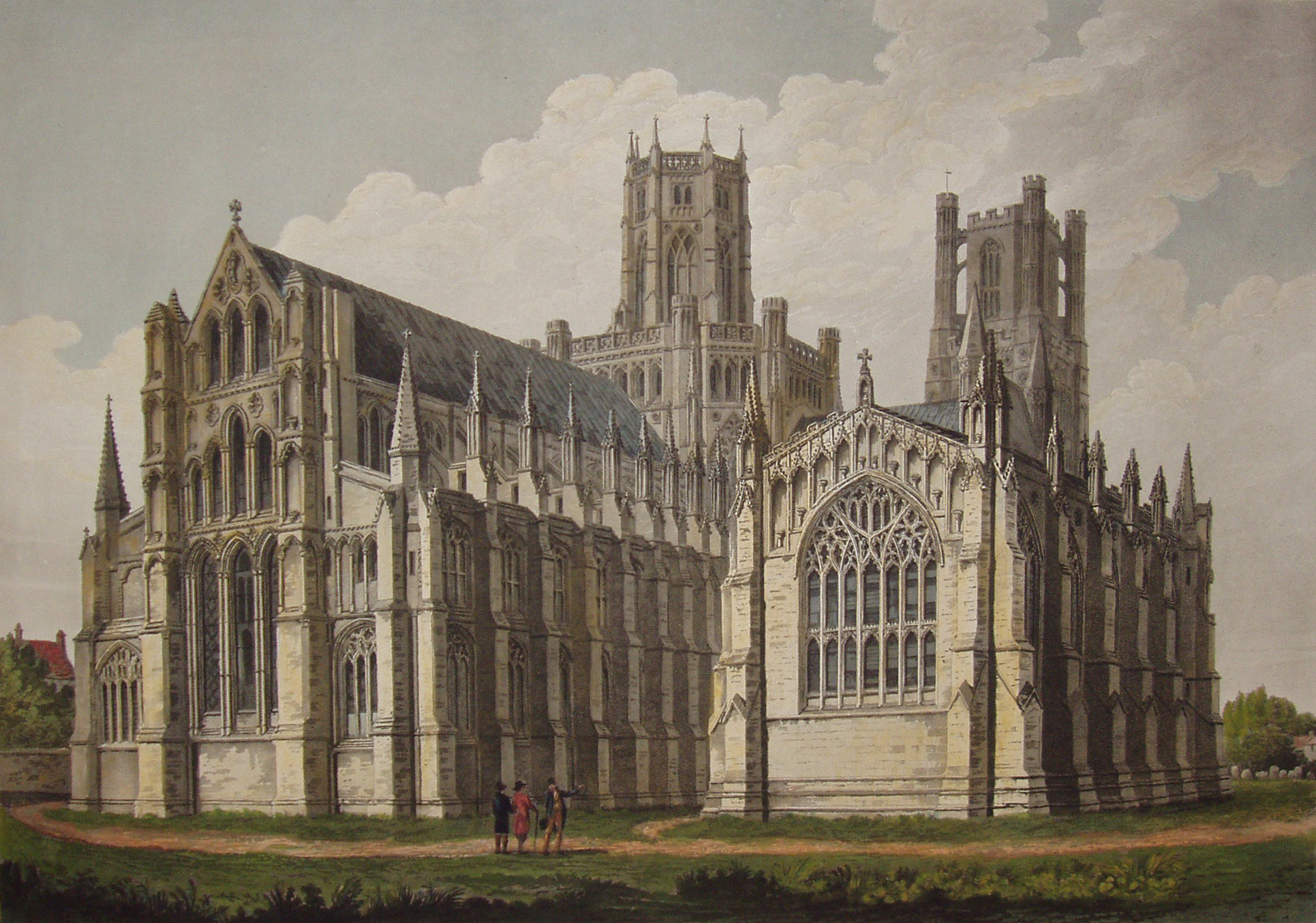
One of Buckler's drawings of Ely Cathedral

John Buckler, Snr FSA (30 November 1770 – 6 December 1851) was a British artist and occasional architect who is best remembered for his many drawings of churches and other historic buildings, recording much that has since been altered or destroyed.

== Biography ==
Buckler was born in Calbourne, Isle of Wight. At the age of 15 he became clerk to the steward of Magdalen College, Oxford and began a lifelong involvement in the management of the college's London estates. After several years working on plans for new buildings, around 1801 he became bailiff and collector of rents for Magdalen College in Freeman's Court, London, and in Southwark, and held this post until his retirement in 1849. The work for the college allowed him ample free time, and he also practised as an architect until 1830, designing buildings such as Halkyn Castle, Flint (1822–27) for Robert Grosvenor, 2nd Earl Grosvenor (later created Marquess of Westminster) the tower of the church in Theale, Berkshire (1827–28). Glastonbury Priory, also called Abbey House, Somerset (1829–30) for J.F. Reeves, and Poll Park, Denbighshire (c. 1828), for William Bagot, 2nd Baron Bagot, "an early essay in the half-timbered style", according to Howard Colvin, who suggested that Buckler had a hand in the Gothic remodelling of Blithfield Hall, Staffordshire, for Lord Bagot, 1822–23. He or his son also designed the church of St John the Baptist, Pentrobin (now Penymynydd), in the County of Flintshire, 1843, for Sir Stephen Glynne, as one of the first Gothic Revival churches that came out of the Cambridge Camden Society.

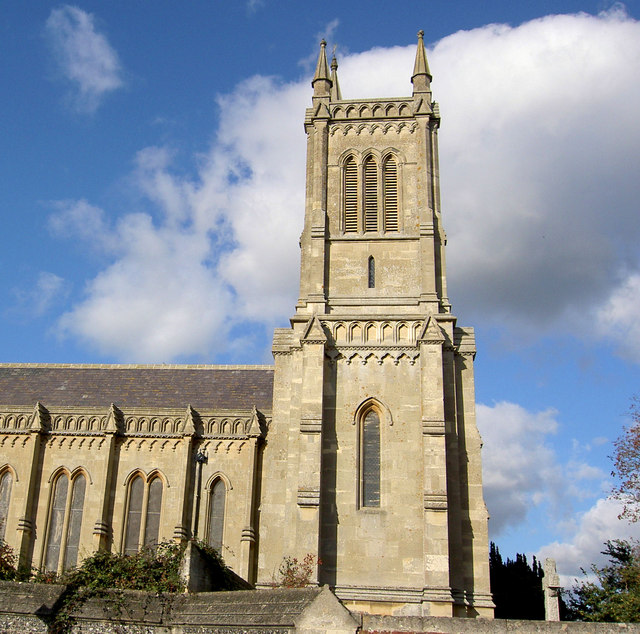
The Holy Trinity Church in Theale, Berkshire. The tower was designed by John Buckler.

Buckler's interest in art developed over time, and his first published works were two aquatints of Magdalen College in 1797. He followed these in 1799 with an engraving of Lincoln Cathedral; the first in a series which included all the cathedrals in England by 1814, as well as many of the collegiate and parish churches. Shortly after 1800 he was commissioned by Richard Colt Hoare of Stourhead to produce ten volumes of drawings of churches and other historic buildings in Wiltshire, and Buckler's grandson described this commission as "deciding his brains for antiquarian pursuits". It was followed by similar commissions from other antiquarians, such as William Salt of Staffordshire, and by the end of his life, by his own account, Buckler had produced around 13,000 drawings of buildings. Many of the buildings Buckler drew had not been previously recorded, and many have since been demolished or substantially altered, so his work is now a valuable source of information on British architectural history. His work was exhibited at the Royal Academy every year from 1798 until 1849, and - after being twice-blackballed in 1808 and 1809 - he became a Fellow of the Society of Antiquaries of London in 1810.

John Buckler died in Newington, London, in 1851, two years after his retirement. Forty-two volumes of his sketches are now held by the British Library; other places holding collections of his work include the Wiltshire Museum at Devizes, Taunton Museum, the William Salt Library in Stafford and the Bodleian Library in Oxford.

== Family ==
His eldest son, John Chessell Buckler (1793–1894), also an architect and artist, wrote several illustrated books on the history of British architecture, and his youngest son, George Buckler (1811–1886), and grandson Charles Alban Buckler (1825–1905) practised as architects as well.

== Sources ==
- Colvin, H.M. (1995). A Biographical Dictionary of British Architects, 1600–1840. New Haven: Yale University Press. pp. not cited. ISBN 0-300-07207-4.
- Tyack, Geoffrey. "Buckler, John (1770–1851)". Oxford Dictionary of National Biography (online ed.). Oxford University Press. doi:10.1093/ref:odnb/3863. (Subscription, Wikipedia Library access or UK public library membership required.)
