= Cobán Cathedral =

St. Dominic Cathedral
- Catedral de Santo Domingo de Guzmán
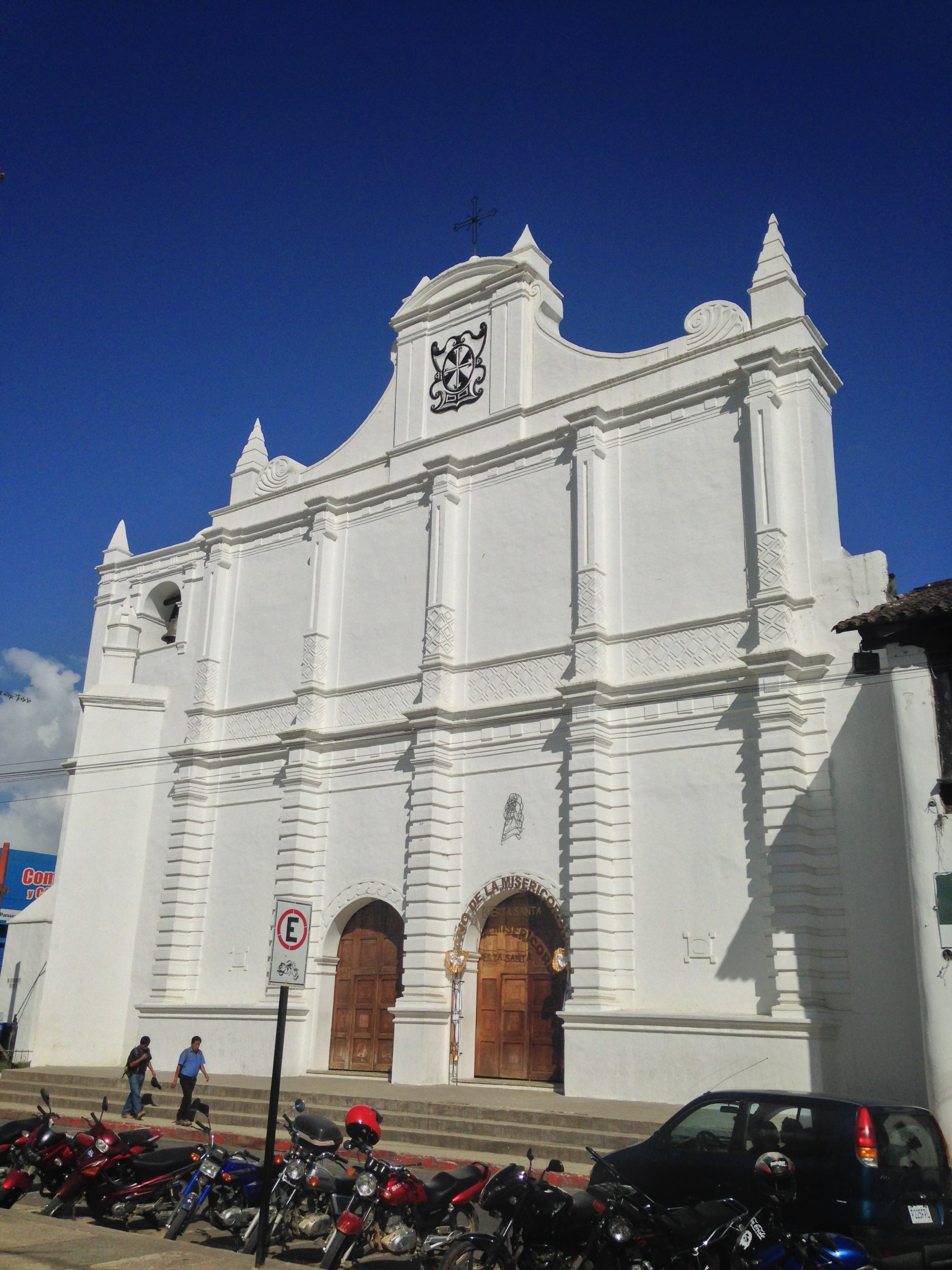
- St. Dominic Cathedral
- Location: Cobán
- Country: Guatemala
- Denomination: Roman Catholic Church

The St. Dominic Cathedral (Spanish: Catedral de Santo Domingo de Guzmán ) also called Cobán Cathedral is a religious building that is affiliated with the Catholic Church and is located in the town and municipality of Cobán in Alta Verapaz department of the Central American country of Guatemala.

The church is one of the oldest structures in the region which dates back to 1543 when it was built by Fray Melchor de Los Reyes being rebuilt later in 1741 and 1799. It was built next to a convent that was built in 1551.

The temple follows the Roman or Latin rite and is the mother of the Diocese of Verapaz (Dioecesis Verae Pacis) which was created in 1935 by Pope Pius XI by the Bull "quoties in regionibus".

It is under the pastoral responsibility of the Bishop Rodolfo Valenzuela Núñez.

== See also ==
- Roman Catholicism in Guatemala
- St. Dominic

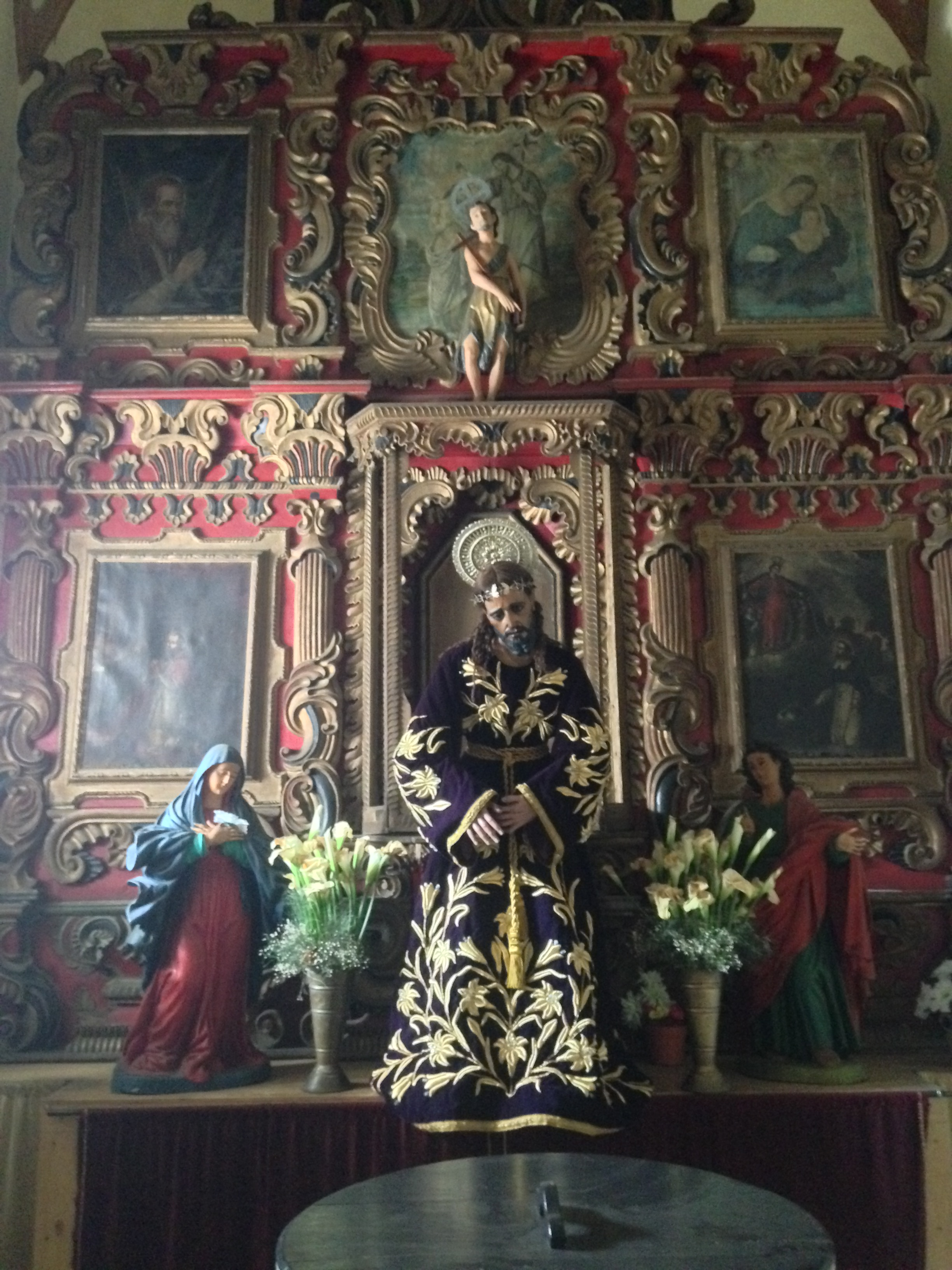
Internal view
