= St Dominic's Priory Church =

Coordinates: 51.5508°N 0.1572°W

Church of Our Lady of the Rosary and St Dominic
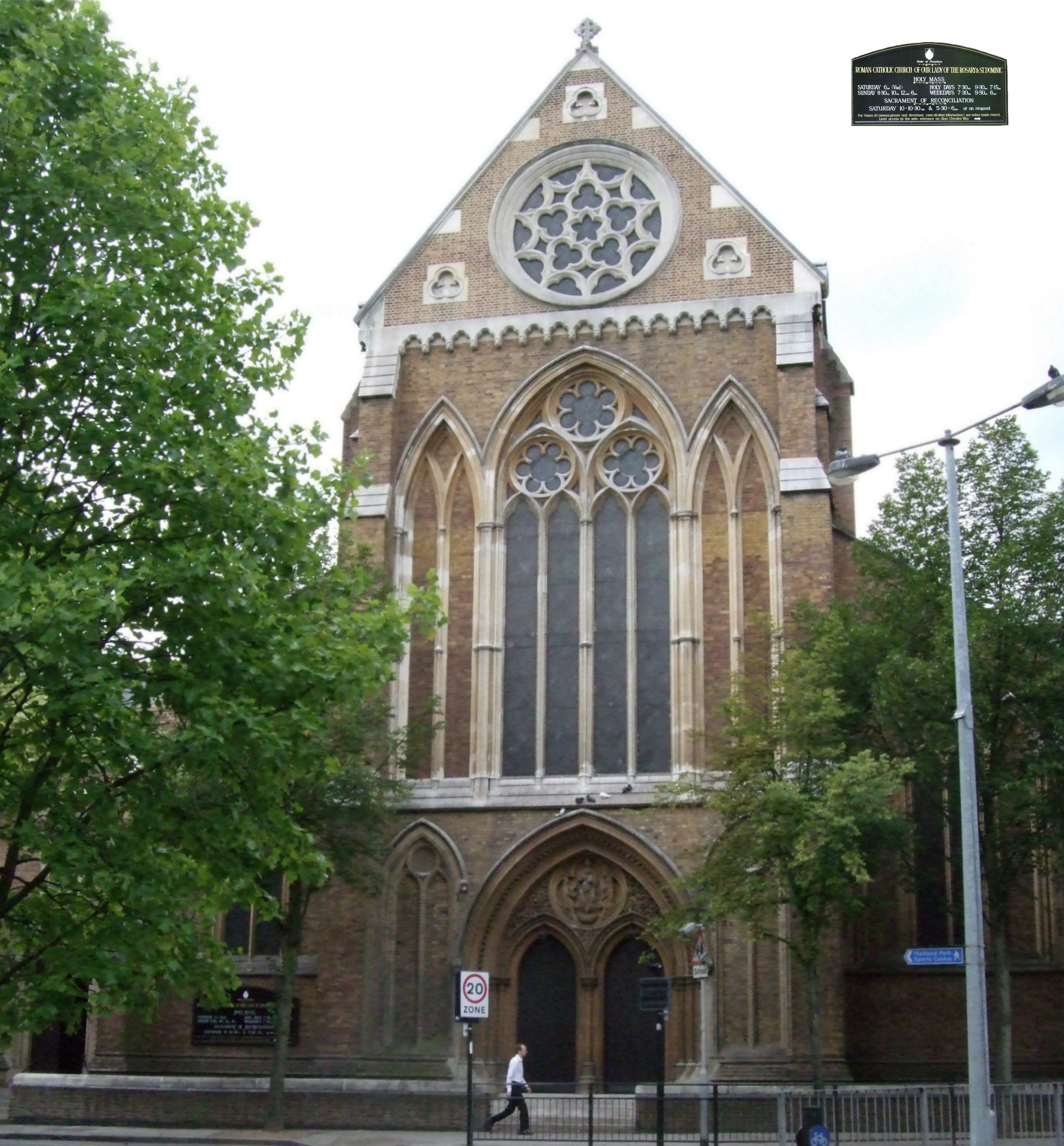
- Church of Our Lady of the Rosary and St Dominic
- Location: Kentish Town, London, NW5
- Country: England
- Denomination: Catholic
- Website: rosaryshrine.co.uk

History
- Dedication: Our Lady of the Rosary and St Dominic
- Consecrated: 1883

Architecture
- Heritage designation: Grade II*
- Architect(s): Gilbert Blount and Charles Alban Buckler
- Style: Neo-Gothic
- Completed: 1890

Specifications
- Materials: Brick, stone and marble

Administration
- Province: Westminster
- Archdiocese: Westminster

Clergy
- Archbishop: Vincent Nichols

St Dominic's Priory Church (formally named "Our Lady of the Rosary and St Dominic") is one of the largest Catholic churches in London. The church is Grade II* listed building on the National Heritage List for England. It has been served by the Order of Preachers (Dominicans) since 1861, the community living in the adjacent Priory. In October 2016, the church was solemnly inaugurated by the Cardinal Archbishop of Westminster, Vincent Nichols, as a diocesan shrine, with a designated mission of promoting the Rosary.

== Location ==
The church and priory are in Southampton Road just south of Hampstead Heath and close to Belsize Park. The nearest stations are Belsize Park and Chalk Farm tube stations both on the Northern line Edgware branch, and Hampstead Heath railway station and Gospel Oak railway stations on London Overground, all about 15 minutes walk away.

== History ==
The Dominican Friars came to the area in 1861 with a community of Friars in the Priory, a community of Dominican Sisters nearby in Constantine Road and a group of Lay Dominicans who meet each month at the Priory.

The priory was opened in 1867 and the Priory Church dates from 1883. The church was opened largely thanks to Countess Tasker, its great benefactress. The road leading down to the Priory (Tasker Road) was named in her memory.

In 1900 a pillar from the chapter house of the London Black Friars (the medieval predecessor of St Dominic's Priory) was discovered during archaeological work in Blackfriars and was removed to the east end of St Dominic's church.

The Priory Church is still named Our Lady of the Rosary and Saint Dominic, as the current notice board makes clear. In 2021 the apse and High Altar of the church underwent cleaning and restoration including the re-gilding of the diapered walls of the apse. The Stations of the Cross, painted by Philip Westlake in 1887, were also restored and a new lighting system installed in the fourteen Rosary Chapels. During the 1990s the Traditional Catholic Mass (in the Roman Rite, rather than the Dominican Rite) was re-established at St. Dominic's at 11.15 am every Sunday. This was by request of the late Cardinal Hume. Currently a Sung Mass in the traditional Dominican rite is sung in Latin every Sunday at 5pm, and this is celebrated at the High Altar. The 12 noon Solemn Mass in the Ordinary Form is also celebrated at the restored High Altar every Sunday.

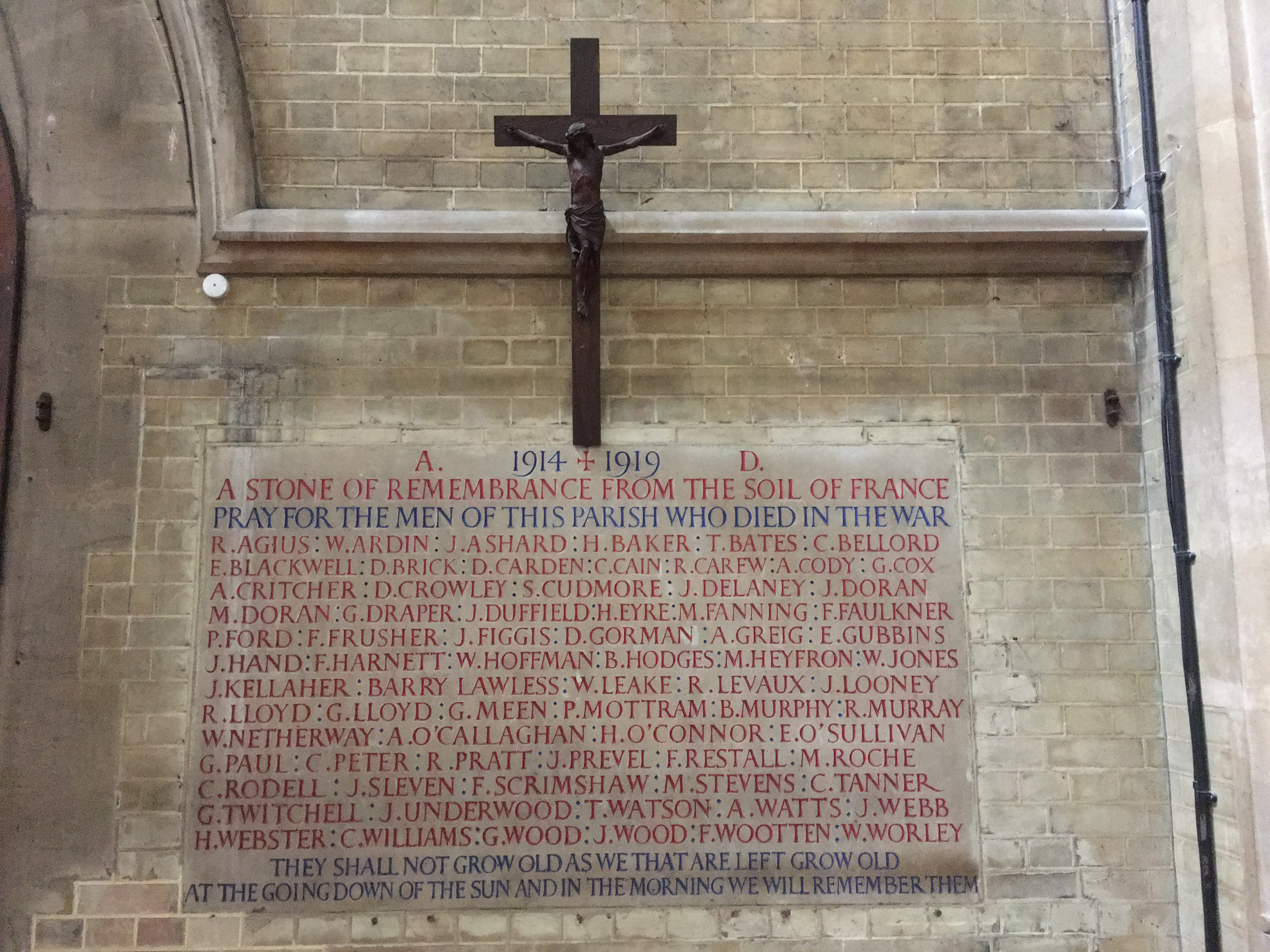
The tablet to the soldiers from the parish who died in World War I.

Two memorials in the church commemorate individuals who were killed in World War I. A large stone tablet by the main door to the church lists the names of soldiers from the area who died in the war. It is made from a large block of stone from a quarry from the French battlefields and was unveiled in 1921. The lettering of the tablet was carved by Eric Gill. A sculpted stone statue of Joan of Arc by the Rosary Chapel marks the death of a soldier killed at Ypres in 1915.

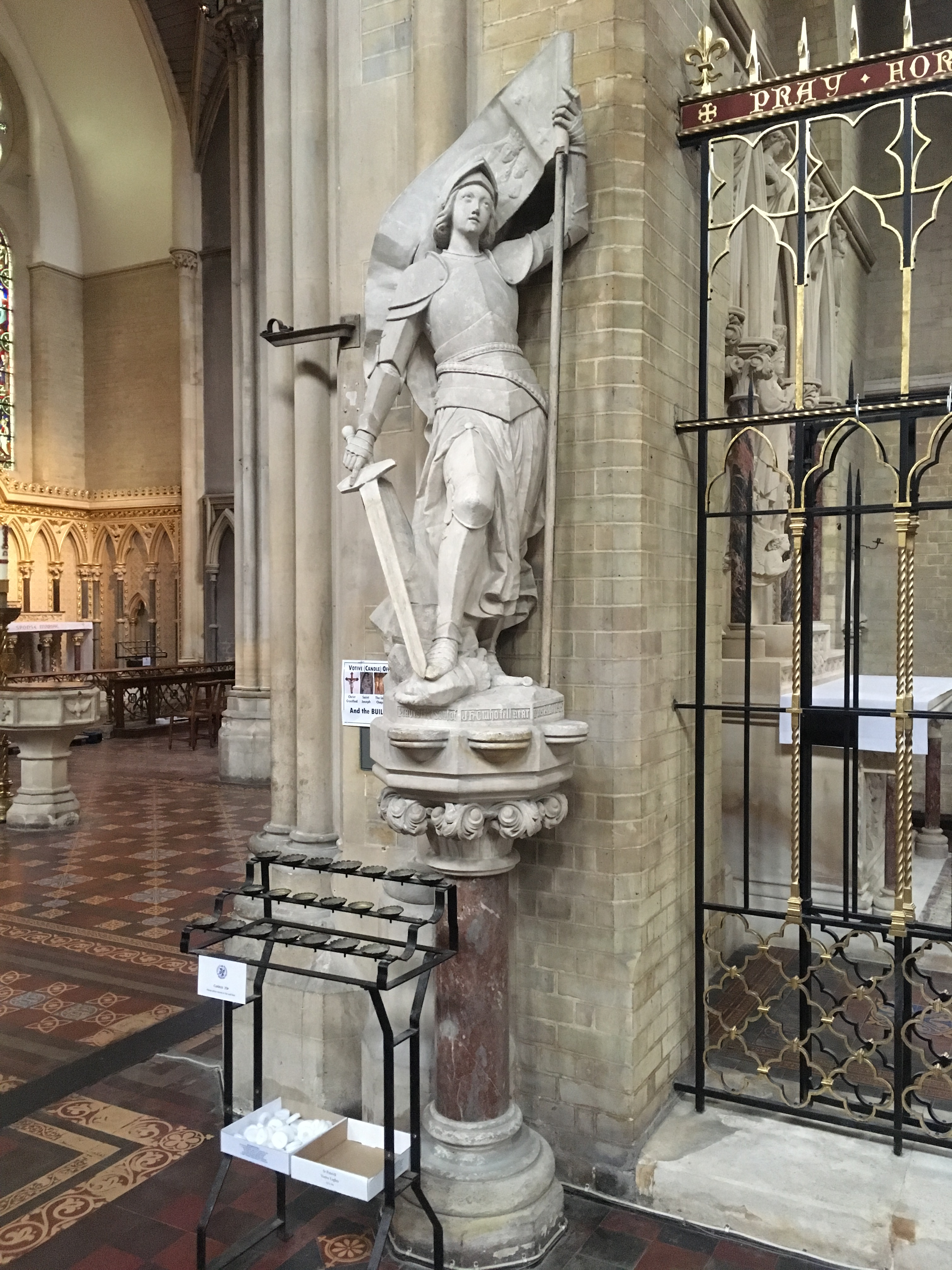
The memorial to a soldier killed at Ypres in 1915.

== Design ==
The design is based on the structure of the Rosary prayer: fourteen side chapels flank each side of the nave. Each chapel commemorates a Mystery of the Rosary: Joyful, Sorrowful, and Glorious. The fifteenth Mystery (the 5th Glorious Mystery) is depicted in the apse of the church around the main High Altar. It is thought that when this church was completed in 1883, it was the first in the world to have distinct side chapels for each Mystery of the Rosary. Each chapel has its own altar with a stone-carved reredos depicting a particular Mystery of the Rosary. The Luminous Mysteries, added by Pope John Paul II in 2002, are commemorated in a Rosary Garden located behind the Lady Chapel of the church, and accessible via the Lady Chapel porch or by Alan Cheales Way. The church was built by Charles Alban Buckler (1824–1905), the son of John Chessell Buckler who designed numerous churches of which this was probably his best.

== Community ==
Both friars and sisters serve the local parish community, with a weekend attendance of about 500 men, women and children, as well as pilgrims and visitors to the Shrine. In the months of May and October, the Shrine hosts a torchlit Rosary Procession every Saturday evening which brings in visitors from across the diocese. The Friars are also engaged in a wide range of local social activity including hospital, university and school chaplaincy, prison ministry, adult education and third level teaching of theology, scripture and philosophy, publishing, post-graduate study, and preaching. Dominican Sisters from the St Joseph Congregation (Lymington) serve the parish every weekend, and they are engaged in sacramental catechesis for children. St Dominic's is also the residence of the Prior Provincial of the Dominican friars in England and Scotland. Next to the church is the diocesan-run Catholic primary school of St Dominic.

== See also ==
- List of monastic houses in England
- List of monastic houses in London
- List of churches and cathedrals of London
- Westminster Cathedral
- Archdiocese of Westminster
