= John Chessell Buckler =

British architect (1793–1894)

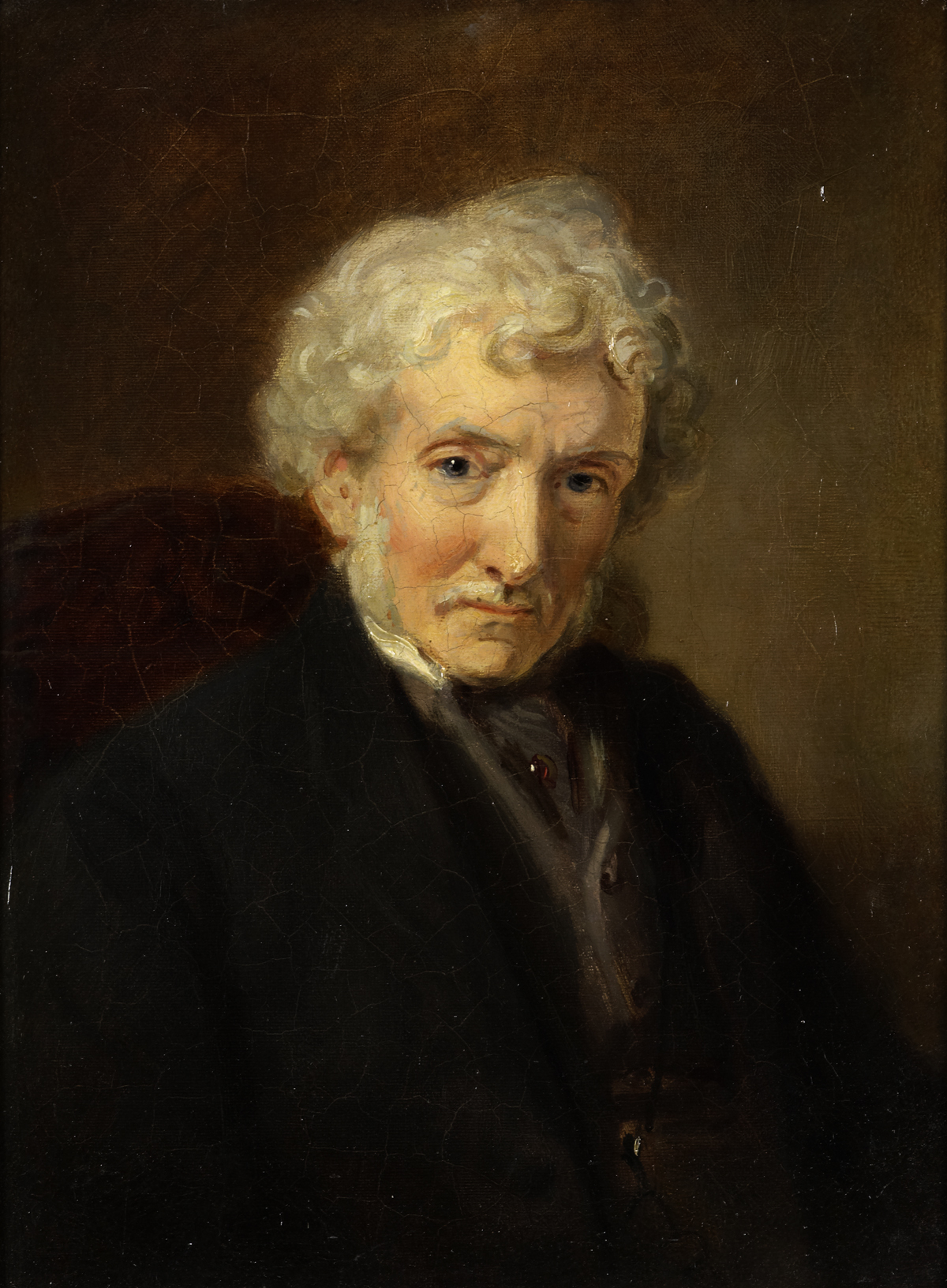
- 1872 portrait
- Born: 8 December 1793
- Died: 10 January 1894 (aged 100)
- Occupation: Architect
- Children: Charles Alban Buckler (son)
- Parent: John Buckler (father)

John Chessell Buckler (8 December 1793 – 10 January 1894) was a British architect, the eldest son of the architect John Buckler. J. C. Buckler initially worked with his father before taking over his practice. His work included restorations of country houses and at the University of Oxford.

== Career ==
In 1811, 18-year-old John Chessell Buckler achieved the distinction of exhibiting at the Royal Academy of Arts. His exhibited work, entry 790, was a watercolour titled 'Interior of Penmon Priory Church, Anglesey' (22.5 × 17 cm), demonstrated a level of technical precision and architectural sensitivity well beyond his years. This rare early watercolour is now preserved within the Ives Collection (UK), forming part of its British Romantic and Architectural lineage

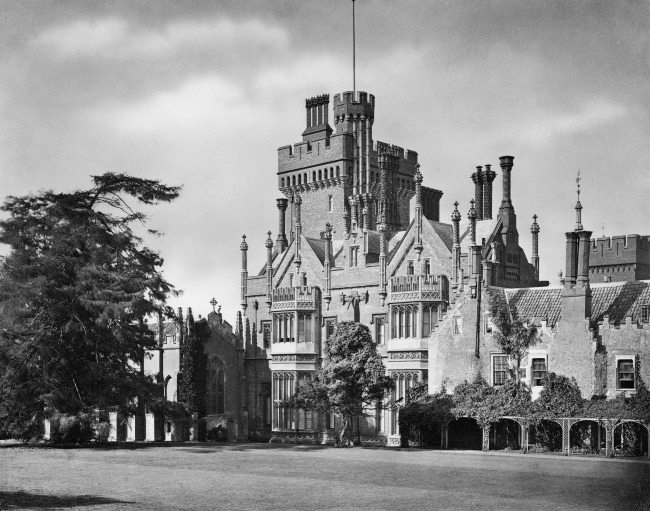
Costessey Hall, Norfolk, as rebuilt by Buckler

Buckler received art lessons from the painter Francis Nicholson. From 1810 onwards he worked with his father. His younger brother, George, later joined them and reported that the three worked "in perfect harmony". In 1830 his father handed over his architectural practice to him, and he worked in partnership with George until 1842.

In 1825 Buckler began rebuilding Costessey Hall, Norfolk, for Lord Stafford. His work there was described by Charles Locke Eastlake, writing in 1872, as "one of the most important and successful instances of the [Gothic] Revival in Domestic Architecture". It was in a "Tudor" style, in red and white brick, with stone dressings. The new buildings formed an irregular picturesque group, with stepped gables, angle turrets and richly moulded chimney-shafts, exhibiting, according to Eastlake "a knowledge of detail and proportion far in advance of contemporary work".

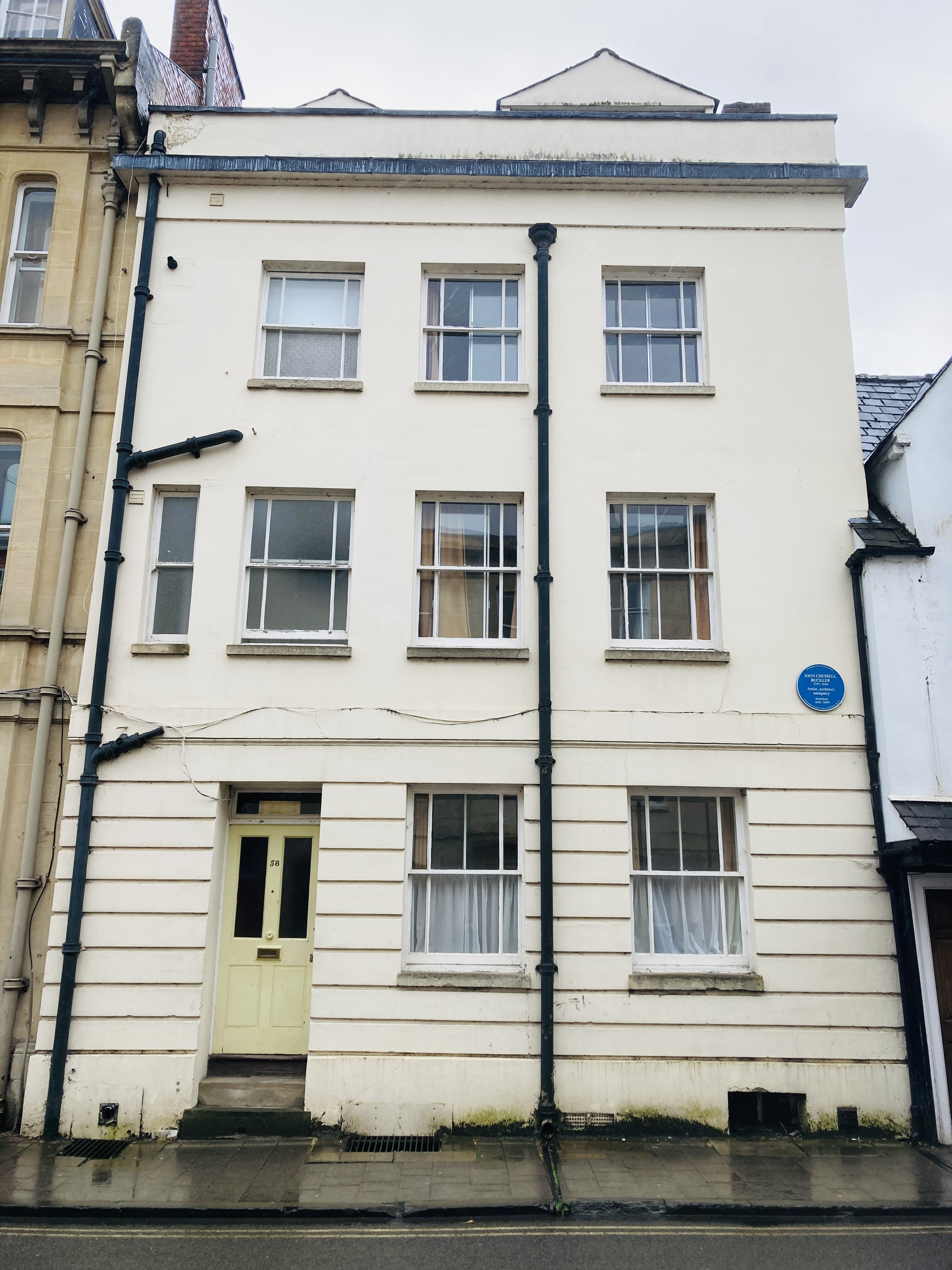
Buckler lived at 58 Holywell Street in Oxford from 1861 to 1889. The blue plaque was unveiled in 2015.

Buckler did a lot of work in Oxford, carrying out repairs and additions to St Mary's Church, and Oriel, Brasenose, Magdalen, and Jesus colleges. He also restored Oxburgh Hall, Norfolk, and Hengrave Hall, Suffolk, and designed Dunston Hall, Norfolk, and Butleigh Court in Somerset.

In 1836 he came second, behind Charles Barry, in the competition to rebuild the Palace of Westminster following its destruction by fire.

Buckler's writings included the text accompanying his father's engravings of Views of the Cathedral Churches of England and Wales (1822). In 1823 he published Observations on the Original Architecture of St. Mary Magdalen College, Oxford, in which he expressed his hostility towards changes in the quadrangle of Magdalen College. Some of his later writings, such as A History of the Architecture of the Abbey Church of St Alban (1847), were in collaboration with his own son, Charles Alban Buckler. He wrote a further polemical work, A Description And Defense Of The Restorations Of The Exterior Of Lincoln Cathedral (1866), a scathing response to accusations that, in capacity as honorary architect to Lincoln Cathedral, he had overseen a damaging restoration involving the 'scraping' of the cathedral fabric.

He died, aged 100, on 10 January 1894.

== List of works ==
=== Gloucestershire ===
- St. Mary the Virgin Church, Lower Swell (rebuilt nave, 1852)

=== Norfolk ===
- Costessey Hall, Costessey (1826)
- Dunston Hall, Dunston (1859)
- Oxburgh Hall, Oxborough

=== Oxfordshire ===
- St. Mary's Church, Adderbury (restoration of chancel, 1831-34)
- Schoolroom at Magdalen College, Oxford (now a library, 1849-51)
- University Church of St Mary the Virgin, Oxford (restoration)
- St. Mary's Church, Pyrton (rebuilding, 1856)
- St. Mary's Church, Steeple Barton (rebuilding, 1850)

=== Somerset ===
- Butleigh Court, Butleigh (1845)
- Church of St. Leonard, Butleigh

=== West Sussex ===
- St. Nicolas Church, Shoreham-by-Sea (restoration of chancel, 1839–40)

== See also ==
- Buildings of Jesus College, Oxford

== Unbuilt proposals ==
Kilronan Castle, Keadue, Co. Roscommon, Ireland.

== Sources ==
- Nairn, Ian; Pevsner, Nikolaus (1965). Sussex. The Buildings of England. Harmondsworth: Penguin Books. p. 287. ISBN 0-14-071028-0.
- Sherwood, Jennifer; Pevsner, Nikolaus (1974). Oxfordshire. The Buildings of England. Harmondsworth: Penguin Books. ISBN 0-14-071045-0.
- Tyack, Geoffrey (2004). "Buckler, John (1770–1851)". Oxford Dictionary of National Biography (online ed.). Oxford University Press. doi:10.1093/ref:odnb/3863. (Subscription, Wikipedia Library access or UK public library membership required.)
- Verey, David (1970). Gloucestershire: The Cotswolds. The Buildings of England. Vol. 1. Harmondsworth: Penguin Books. p. 442. ISBN 0-14-071040-X.
- Mardell, Joshua (2020). "Getting into a Scrape: The Buckler Dynasty, Lincoln Cathedral and Mid-Victorian Architectural Politics". Architectural History. pp. 191–218. doi:10.1017/arh.2020.5.
