= Botetourt Medal =

Award of the College of William & Mary

- Awarded for: Academic achievement
- Sponsored by: Norborne Berkeley, 4th Baron Botetourt (1770); Norborne Berkeley (1941)
- Location: Williamsburg, Virginia
- Country: United States
- Presented by: College of William & Mary
- Eligibility: William & Mary undergraduate students
- Obverse: George III
- Reverse: Chartering of the College of William & Mary
- Motto: Quæsitvm Meritis (Latin, transl. Sought for his merits)
- Established: 1770
- First award: August 15, 1772

The Botetourt Medal (Note: Botetourt is pronounced "bot-eh-tot".) is an academic award and medal annually presented by the College of William & Mary to the most academically distinguished undergraduate student at the college. The award's namesake, Norborne Berkeley, 4th Baron Botetourt, then the colonial governor of Virginia, first announced the medal in 1770 as an award to two students each year. It was first awarded from 1772 until the American Revolution ended the practice in 1775. It was revived as the Lord Botetourt Medal in 1941 through an endowment by Norborne Berkeley, who was named for and a descendant of the colonial governor. It has been awarded annually on Commencement Day in May.

The medal was the second academic prize medal in what is now the United States, and the first such award to be struck. The dies used for these medals were engraved by Thomas Pingo, an engraver at the Royal Mint. The obverse depicts King George III, with the reverse depicting James Blair receiving the college's charter from King William III and Queen Mary II in 1693. Of the eight gold Botetourt Medals awarded through 1775, at least three survive, as do examples in copper and silver. Unusually, the original dies survive and are possibly the oldest dies in the United States.

When the award was revived in 1941, the Medallic Art Company copied the original dies and produced silver, gold-filled, and matte yellow bronze medals for the college. The gold-filled medals, featuring an altered rim design, are those presently awarded.

== Design ==
=== Original issue ===
The original gold Botetourt Medals were created with dies produced in 1771 by the Royal Mint in London. The dies were engraved by Thomas Pingo, an Italian who was then the second engraver at the Royal Mint. The medals are circular and measure 1.7 inches (43 mm) in diameter and 0.1 inches (2.5 mm) thick. The medals were struck from these dies, likely with a collar that prevented them from adopting the ovate shape present in most early American coinage. Such collars or a Castaing machine were possibly responsible for the raised rims. Ejection marks are absent on the medals and may indicate the edges were buffed at the mint. The squared, plain edges demonstrate a quality considered unlikely for 18th-century colonial Virginia, which suggests the medals were struck in England. Two gold examples had observed weights of 43.0 g (1.52 oz) and 41.96 g (1.480 oz). (Note: John Camm White's surviving medal was holed and is more worn than the other weighed example.)

The obverse and reverse of the medal are in the "medal reverse" orientation, so that the sides are same side up. The obverse depicts King George III's head in profile surrounded by the Latin text Regnante Georgio Tertio Musis Amico (transl. "George the Third, a friend to the Muses, reigning"). The numismatist Raymond H. Williamson called Pingo's portrayal of George III "very professionally and painstakingly executed" and attributed this to "the stringent requirements for royal approval". Unusually, George III is not laureated; Williamson speculated that this may have been to "satisfy a Colonial whim". Below his head, Quæsitvm Meritis (Latin, transl. "sought for his merits") is inscribed in two lines. Both inscriptions on the obverse are in capitals. Also in capitals is "T. Pingo F." ("Thomas Pingo made it") on the bust's truncation. (Note: In 1895, The American Journal of Numismatics editor W. T. R. Marvin described this side as the reverse. Both Robert J. Morrison of The William and Mary Quarterly in 1919 and Williamson described the bust as on the obverse.)

The reverse depicts James Blair, the first president of the College of William & Mary and its cofounder, receiving the royal charter for the college from King William III and Queen Mary II on February 8, 1693. Blair is presented in clerical dress, kneeling on his right knee, and with his arms outstretched towards the enthroned King. The King is depicted slighting leaning forward towards Blair. The King is extending the charter in his right hand while resting his left on the throne; Blair is receiving the charter in his own right hand. The Queen, in a crown and robe, is standing behind the two men. A necklace is visible on the original medals. The abbreviated Latin phrase Gul. et Mar. tradunt Blaro chart. Col. ("William and Mary deliver to Blair the charter of the College") is inscribed around the scene in capitals; this describes the scene as Blair's receipt of the charter from the monarchs. The Latin Anno Regni Quarto is below the figures, indicating the date of the chartering as within the fourth year of the monarchs' reign.

=== Reissue ===
The Medallic Art Company was contracted to strike the reissue medals from 1941. The medals were struck from hand-cut "reconstructed dies" utilizing the surviving dies from the college's archives. These medals were produced in silver, gold-filled, and matte yellow bronze. The 1941 medal was gold-filled silver, and the annually awarded medals have since been gold-filled. Until c. 1960, additional specimens were produced for the college.

All of the medals since the award was revived have the recipients' names and the company's logo on the edges. Williamson characterized the reissue's texture as "modern" and noted the limited visibility of the necklace on Queen Mary II's neck. The reissue has been presented as a definitional example of replicas within numismatics.

== History ==
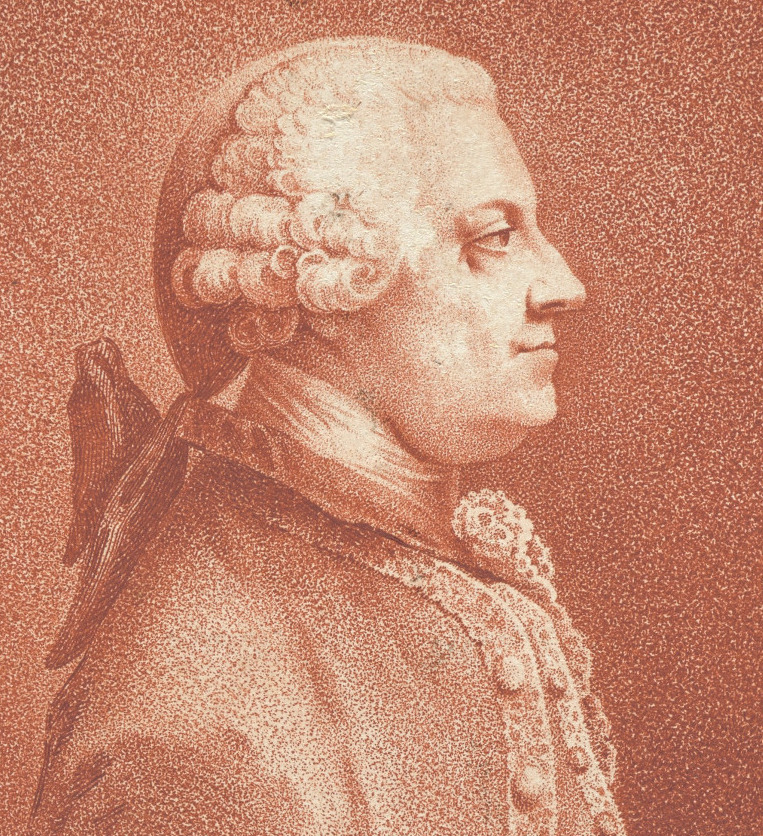
Norborne Berkeley, 4th Baron Botetourt endowed the award as part of his broader patronage of the college.

Norborne Berkeley, 4th Baron Botetourt – commonly known as Lord Botetourt – served briefly as the colonial governor of the British Colony of Virginia from 1768 until his 1770 death in office. His time in office was positively received despite political strife between him and the House of Burgesses. As governor, he also became rector of the board of visitors of the College of William & Mary, with Lord Botetourt acknowledging the college as his "present object" in December 1769.

An intellectually inclined man, Lord Botetourt placed the college under his patronage. While he achieved its academic rejuvenation, he planned several further reforms to the college. Of these reforms, only his plans to establish the annual awarding of two gold medals to students of the college, one each for "Philosophical Learning" and "Classical Learning" (sciences), survives. His medals were publicly announced in the Virginia Gazette on March 22, 1770.

These medals were intended to incentivize scholarship among the students, with potential recipients to fulfill significant requirements. After selection, the recipients of either medal were to complete a public oration of their own composition on Transfer Day (August 15) (Note: Transfer Day commemorated the anniversary of the 1729 ceremony celebrating the transfer of the governing authority of the college to the president and masters of the college. During the 18th century, it was considered the college's birthday. A 1771 Transfer Day oration by William Leigh was published, prior to the first awarding of the medal.) before the colonial governor, the college's board of visitors, and other Virginian notables. Addressing the failure of the college to issue any bachelor's degrees since its 1693 establishment, Lord Botetourt stipulated that annual awards would also be established for those with "the best Degrees in the Arts and learned Languages" once there were enough men completing those degrees.

Lord Botetourt endowed these medals, paying Pingo slightly less than £100 for both the dies and first strikes of the medal, as well as establishing a fund sufficient to pay for the annual purchase of gold for the medals with its interest. Graham Hood, who served as the curator for the Colonial Williamsburg Foundation, credited Henry Somerset, 5th Duke of Beaufort with the medal surviving the governor's death in 1770. The duke, who was Lord Botetourt's nephew and principal beneficiary, had been aware of his uncle's plans for the medal. He ensured that eight gold medals and several proofs were struck.

The first two of these awards were presented on July 22, 1772, after Lord Botetourt's death. The first awards were to Nathaniel Burwell (philosophy) and James Madison (classics). Burwell and Madison also received the first bachelor's degrees conferred by the college, with Madison later becoming president of the college. (Note: A faculty resolution from August 11, 1772, named Thomas Davis instead of Madison as the other student who was to receive a bachelor's degree alongside Burwell; a Virginia Gazette article from August 20 contradicts this and instead lists Madison.)

While sometimes referred to as the first collegiate medal in the United States, it was the second such award and followed the King's College medals. (Note: Williamson described the Botetourt Medal as the "first collegiate medal issued in America", while historian Graham Hood described it as the "first medals for scholastic excellence established in America".) However, the King's College medals were engraved, making the Botetourt Medal the first to be struck. Prior to the award's interruption by the American Revolution, eight Botetourt Medals were awarded.

=== Revival ===
Norborne Berkeley, who was named for and a descendant of the medal's original sponsor, endowed the revival of the award. Berkeley had become director of the Bethlehem Steel Corporation in 1935 – later becoming its vice president in 1945 – and served on the board of visitors of the University of Virginia. Berkeley's papers are in University of Virginia's special collections library and include material on the revived medal.

The Metallic Art Company was contacted in 1940 to produce replica dies from the original dies held in the college's archives. Using these replica dies, new medals were struck. Now called the Lord Botetourt Medal, it was awarded for the first time since the American Revolution to Forrest D. Murden in 1941. It has been awarded on Commencement Day in May each year since.

== Surviving original materials ==
Three gold examples of the original eight awarded Botetourt Medals are known to have survived into the 20th century. The location of one, that awarded to Samuel Shields in 1773, was last known in the early 20th century, when it was in the possession of Shields' descendants. John Camm White's 1775 award has been in the collection of the Virginia Historical Society since 1918, when it was donated to the society by Mary White Colston. (Note: Colston was the granddaughter of one of John White's daughters and the widow of the grandson of John White's other daughter.) White's medal was holed so that it could be suspended; this was likely done outside of where it was minted. Burwell's 1772 medal, which had been passed down to one of his descendants, was donated to the Colonial Williamsburg Foundation in 1982.

At least five copper and bronze examples struck with the original dies, including two in the college's possession and another in the Ashmolean Museum's collection, are known. One bronze proof in the college's possession likely belonged to the Duke of Beaufort. This specimen shows evidence of tinning, which would have given the medal a shiny appearance. In 2001, a copper medal sold for at auction for $12,650 (equivalent to $23,001 in 2025); in 2024, a copper specimen graded as MS-65 sold at auction for $10,800.

A silver specimen of the original medal, likely the unique example in this material, survives in the British Museum's collection. Prior to its acquisition by the museum, the silver example had been in the collection of Edward Hawkins, who was a numismatic author and the museum's Keeper of Antiquities. An impression of the medal's reverse in plaster covered by wax also survives. It was made as a trial or proof impression. This impression was in the possession of Lewis Pingo – Thomas Pingo's son – and was sold several times in the 20th century.

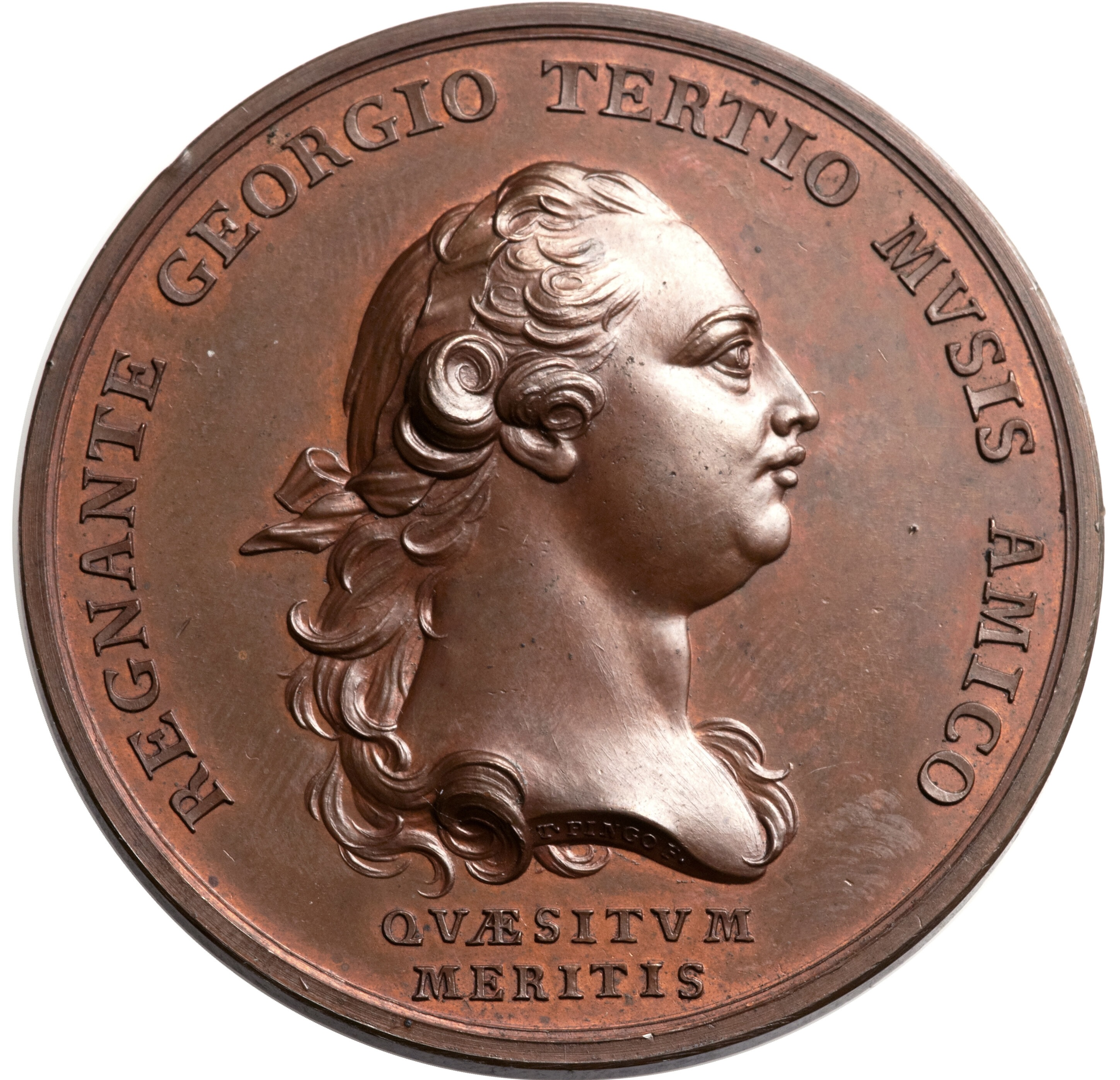
Obverse of copper medal

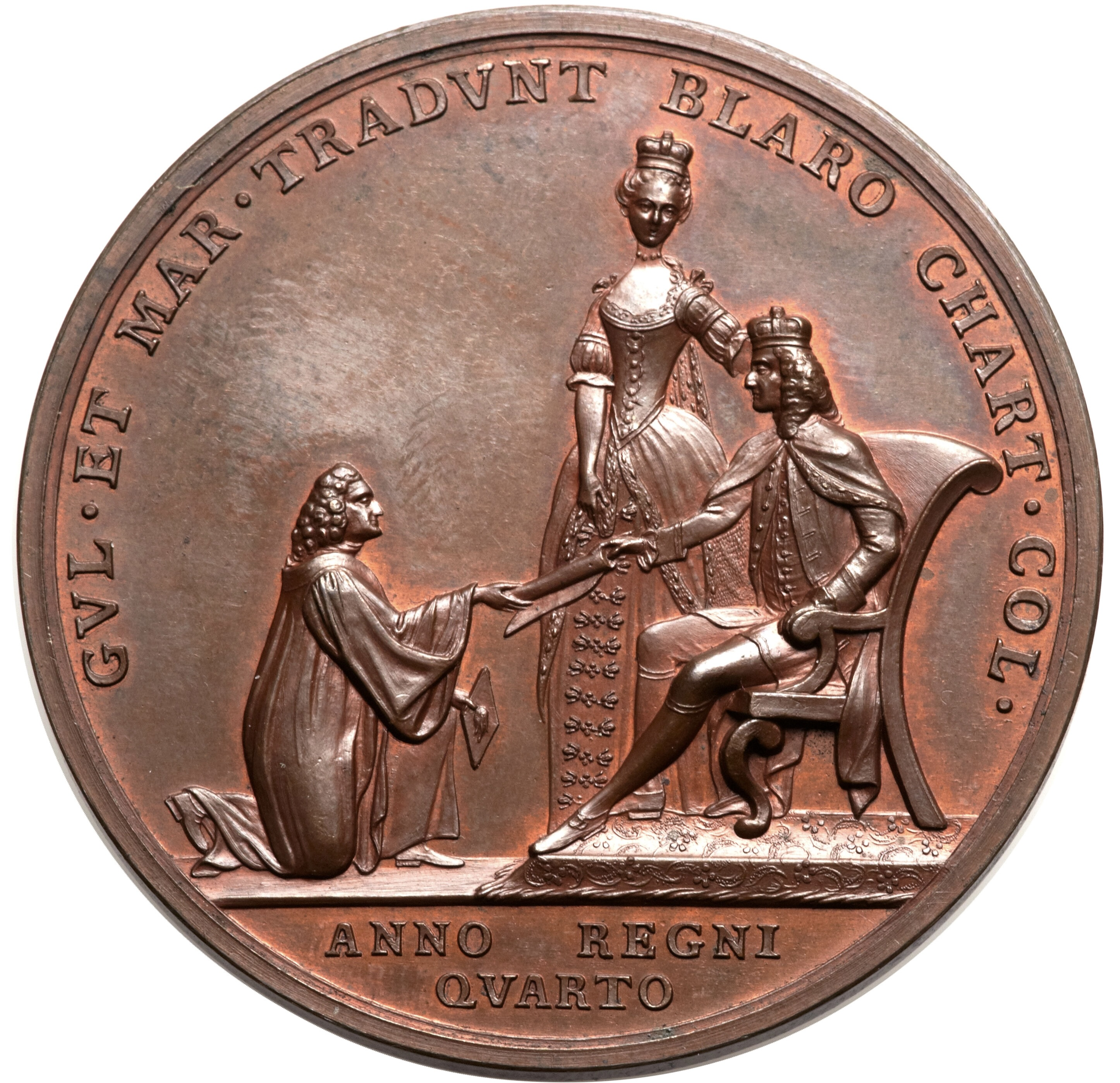
Reverse of copper medal

The original obverse and reverse dies for the medal survive in the college's Earl Gregg Swem Library collections. These dies consist of an inner steel cylinder containing the actual engraved die surrounded by octagonal iron die holders. These dies are corroded, a symptom of their protective oil coating having deteriorated. However, the dies remained sufficiently intact to permit the creation of the replica dies. Each die features a logo of a company name. While this company name is interpreted as "McCartney and Bayley", the corrosion had already progressed on both dies such that "McCartney" is partially conjectural; no contemporaneous company by this name is known. The survival of these dies from the colonial period in the United States is unusual; they are possibly the oldest surviving dies in the country.

== Criteria ==
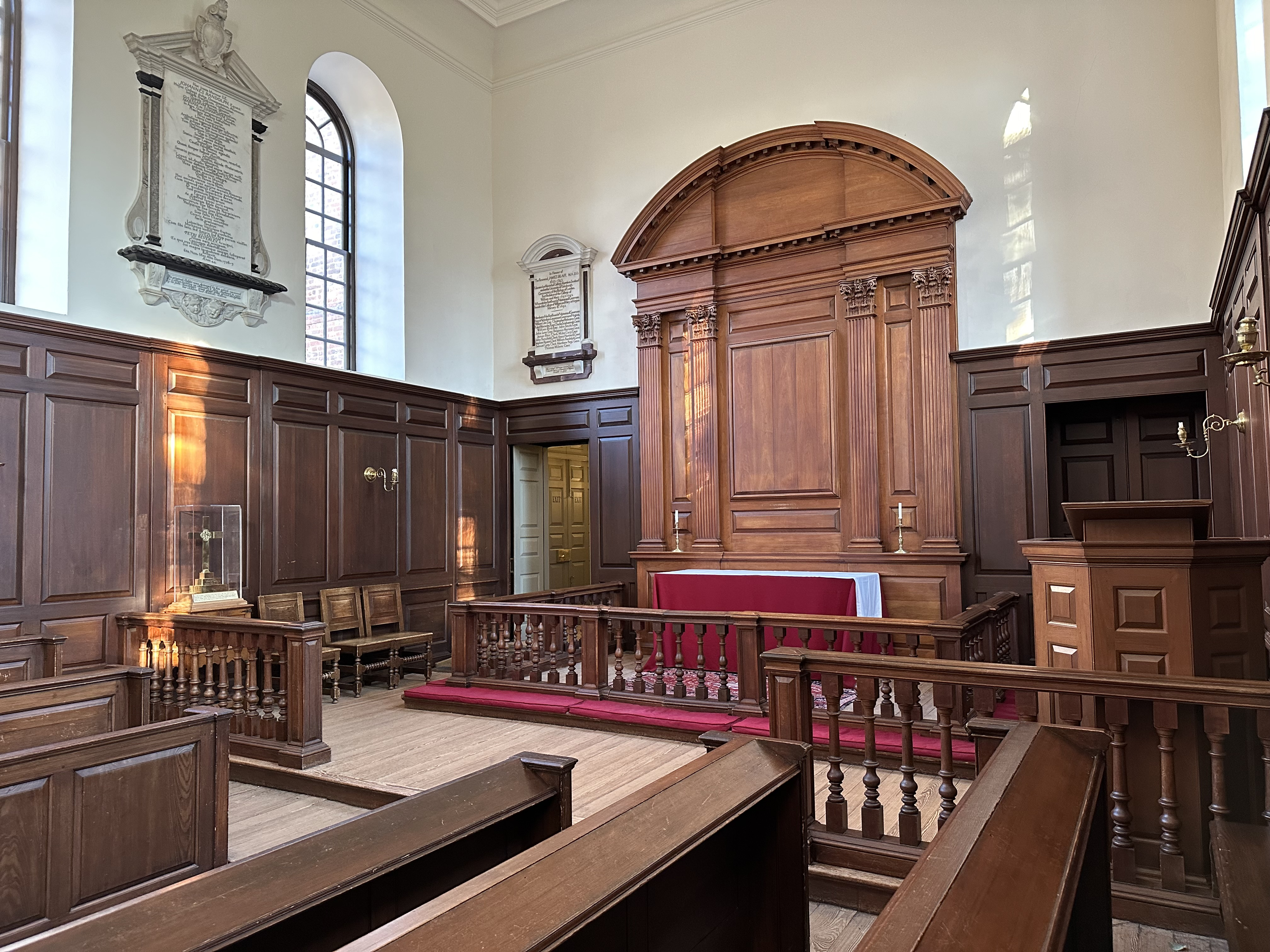
Transfer Day orations were to be delivered in the College Building's chapel (reconstruction pictured).

Lord Botetourt's requirements for recipients of the Botetourt Medal were strenuous. Students from the college's Philosophy School were to recite "Latin Declarations" in the chapel of the College Building (now the Wren Building), a rotation of two reciting their orations every other Thursday after Evensong starting on the second Thursday of the term.

Copies of these orations would be retained by the president so that he and the faculty could consult them in determining the recipient of the philosophy award. The classical learning award's conditions were similarly challenging. Following the announcement of the recipients, the awardees would only take possession of their medal after giving a public oration on Transfer Day. The Transfer Day orations immediately preceded the awarding of the medals, both of which were to occur within the chapel.

Since its revival in 1941, the Lord Botetourt Medal has been awarded to a "single undergraduate student with the greatest distinction in scholarship". The Lord Botetourt Medal is now presented annually on Commencement Day in May.

== Recipients ==
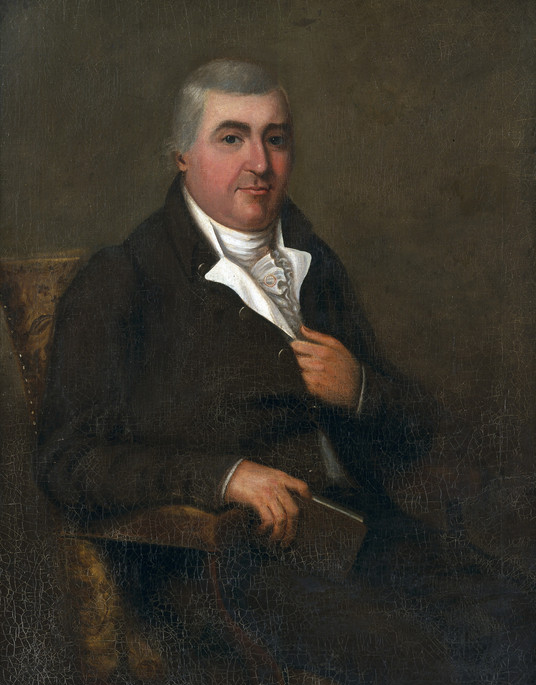
Nathaniel Burwell

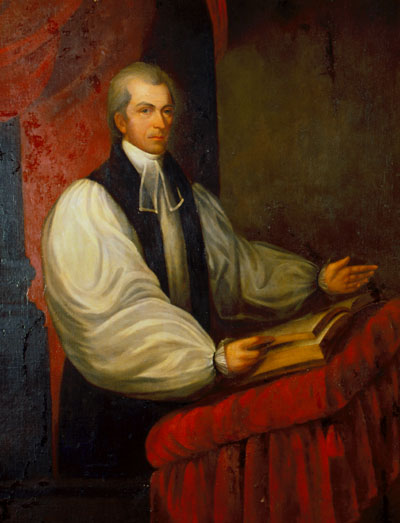
James Madison

Burwell and Madison were the first recipients of the Botetourt Medal. Madison would go on to become the president of the college.

Eight College of William & Mary students received the Botetourt Medals before the American Revolution prevented further awards. Each year, from 1772 through 1775, two students received medal. The recipients during the 18th-century were the following:

- 1772: Nathaniel Burwell (Natural Philosophy), James Madison (Classics)
- 1773: David Stewart (Natural Philosophy), Samuel Shields (Classics)
- 1774: Joseph Eggleston (Natural Philosophy), Walker Maury (Classics)
- 1775: John Camm White (Natural Philosophy), Thomas Evans (Classics)

Each year since its revival in 1941 – except for one year – only one student from the graduating undergraduate class at the college is awarded the Lord Botetourt Medal. In 1990, the medal was given to two students: Matthew James McIrvin and Laura Morgan Robinson. Recipients of the revived award also include the poet Ennis Rees (1946), historian Robert Earl Roeder (1951), education researcher Gerald Bracey (1962), and biologist Jerry Coyne (1971). The most recent recipient is Alexander M. Holland, who received the medal in 2026.
