= Royal Australasian College of Physicians =

Non-profit medical association (1938–)

The Royal Australasian College of Physicians
- Abbreviation: RACP
- Formation: 1938
- Headquarters: Sydney, Australia
- Location: Australia
- Region served: Australia & New Zealand
- Members: 32,000
- Official language: English
- President: Prof. Jennifer Martin
- President-elect: Dr. Sharmila Chandran
- Website: https://www.racp.edu.au

The Royal Australasian College of Physicians (RACP) is a not-for-profit professional organisation responsible for training and educating physicians and paediatricians across Australia and New Zealand.

The RACP is responsible for training both generalist and subspecialist physicians and paediatricians. The College has formal training programmes in general and acute medicine, paediatrics & child health, addiction medicine, adolescent medicine, cardiology, clinical genetics, dermatology (New Zealand only), clinical haematology, immunology and allergy, clinical pharmacology, community child health, endocrinology, gastroenterology, geriatric medicine, infectious diseases, neonatology, nephrology, neurology, nuclear medicine, oncology, respiratory and sleep medicine, public health medicine, occupational and environmental medicine, palliative medicine, rehabilitation, rheumatology, and sexual health medicine. The RACP is also responsible for the ongoing education of Fellows of the College through its continuing professional development (CPD) programme.

== History ==
Until the 1930s, Australian and New Zealand Physicians had to seek membership of one of the United Kingdom Colleges in London, Glasgow, Ireland or Edinburgh.

In November 1930, a group of physicians met in Melbourne to establish the Association of Physicians of Australasia "for friendship and scientific stimulus", which solely consisted of its members; no building or permanent base existed.

In 1934, the Association of Physicians of Australasia Council decided that an examining and executive body College should be formed to enhance the prestige of the profession, stimulate interest in medical education and research, and set a standard of professional ethical conduct. The constitution was to be modelled on that of the London College.

In 1937, the Association purchased premises at 145 Macquarie Street, Sydney, which had originally been the home of the Fairfax family. Funds were raised by the NSW Government and public donation.

In 1938, the College was incorporated and the first meeting of the Council was held in April.

The motto of "hominum servire saluti" ("to serve the health of our people") was adopted for the College coat of arms.

In September that year 47 candidates took the first examinations and 41 members were admitted.

In May 1973 a green ban was placed by the NSW Builders Labourers Federation on the Royal Australasian College of Physicians building in Macquarie Street, Sydney. This followed a request from the National Trust. Demolition was averted and the building subsequently renovated.

== Structure ==
The RACP is divided into two Divisions and three Faculties. Each Division has a number of Chapters.

=== Divisions ===
- Adult Medicine Division
- Paediatrics & Child Health Division

=== Faculties ===
- Australasian Faculty of Public Health Medicine
- Australasian Faculty of Rehabilitation Medicine
- Australasian Faculty of Occupational and Environmental Medicine

=== Chapters ===
- Chapter of Community Child Health
- Australasian Chapter of Palliative Medicine
- Australasian Chapter of Addiction Medicine
- Australasian Chapter of Sexual Health Medicine (formerly Australasian College of Sexual Health Physicians)

=== Speciality societies ===
The RACP is affiliated with 51 independent Speciality Societies. These are independent membership organisations for individuals who practice in a specific medical subspeciality. The RACP consults closely with these societies when designing its curricula. The RACP provided a pathway for intensive care medicine specialty training in Australia and New Zealand until an independent intensive care medicine college was launched in 2008.

== Facilities ==
The History of Medicine Library at the RACP has a leading collection of medical history items from Australia and around the world. The RACP established the History of Medicine Library in 1938 as a clinical library. The focus of the library changed to medical history in the mid 1950s. The History of Medicine Library continues to grow through the contributions of College Members.

== Awards ==
At the annual RACP Congress, selected members are recognised for their achievements and contributions to the RACP and medicine via a variety of prizes and medals. As of 2025 the awards given by the RACP to individuals include, among others:

- Eric Susman Prize, for best contribution to the knowledge of any branch of internal medicine
- John Sands Medal
- College Medal
- Neil Hamilton Fairley Medal

== Publications ==
The RACP also publishes two medical journals, The Internal Medicine Journal and The Journal of Paediatrics and Child Health, and has a foundation which provides funding for research in the field of internal medicine.

The RACP issued a position statement on non-therapeutic circumcision of boys in 2010.

== Qualifications ==
=== Fellow ===
The qualification of "Fellow of the Royal Australasian College of Physicians", abbreviated as the post-nominal initials FRACP, is a recognition of the completion of the prescribed postgraduate specialist training programme in internal adult or internal paediatric medicine of the Royal Australasian College of Physicians.

== Arms ==
Coat of arms of the Royal Australasian College of Physicians
Notes Designed by the Rouge Dragon Pursuivant of Arms, Eric Neville Geijer. Adopted Granted by the Kings of Arms, 27 September 1938 (Earl Marshal's Warrant, 15 September 1938). Crest On a Wreath of the Colours in front of a Sun rising Or a Hand grasping a Rod of Aesculapius erect proper. Torse Or and Azure. Helm A closed Helmet. Escutcheon Azure, a Pomegranate slipped and leaved Or seeded Gules issuant from the chief a Cloud proper irradiated Gold. Supporters On the dexter side an Emu, and on the sinister side a Kiwi, both proper. Compartment A grassy field. Other elements Mantling Azure doubled Or. Symbolism The Arms are based on those granted in 1546 to the Royal College of Physicians (RCP) in London, with the healing rays of the sun representing divine authority. The meaning of the pomegranate in the RCP arms is contested, but is thought to mean regeneration and fertility in classical mythology, and/or to medicinal plants. In John Guillim's Display of Heraldrie (1664) he noted on the heraldic use of the pomegranate: "This fruit is holden to be of profitable use in Physick, for the qualifying and allaying of the scorching heat of burning Agues, for which end the juyce thereof is reckoned to have a very soveraigne vertue." The rising sun in the crest is a traditional symbol of Australia, representing the growth of a new nation. The Rod of Asclepius is a traditional Greek symbol of healing and medicine, and its position being upheld by a hand represents the ideals of medical practitioners. The status of the College encompassing members in Australia and New Zealand is represented in the supporters, with the Emu representing Australia, and the Kiwi representing New Zealand.
