= George Nayler =

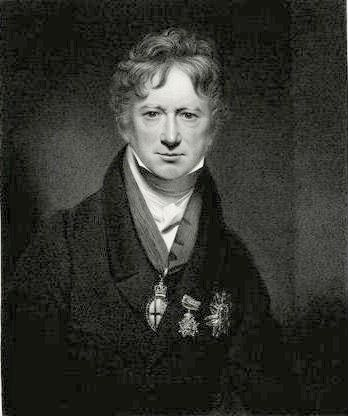
Sir George Nayler

Sir George Nayler, KH FRS (bapt. 29 June 1764 – 28 October 1831) was a long-serving officer of arms at the College of Arms in London.

== Early life ==
George Nayler was born on 29 June 1764 in Stonehouse, Gloucestershire. He was the fifth son of George Nayler, surgeon, of Stroud, Gloucestershire, and his wife Sarah, daughter of John Fark of Clitheroe, Lancashire.

== Heraldic career ==
Nayler was originally a miniature painter. In 1792, he married Charlotte Williams, the illegitimate daughter of Sir John Guise, 1st Baronet. That year, he acquired a loan of £1,300 to purchase the resignation of John Suffield Brown as Genealogist of the Order of the Bath and Blanc Coursier Herald and Nayler was appointed on 15 June 1792. The following year, Nayler acquired a post in the College of Arms as Bluemantle Pursuivant for £60 and on the accidental deaths of Somerset and York heralds at Haymarket in 1794. He was promoted to York Herald that year.

In 1813, Nayler was knighted by The Prince Regent at Carlton House. In 1816 and 1818, respectively, Nayler was appointed King of Arms of the newly created orders of the Royal Guelphic Order and the Order of St Michael and St George.

In 1820, he was promoted as Clarenceux King of Arms, officiating in place of Isaac Heard at the coronation of George IV in 1821. A year later, Nayler succeeded Heard as Garter and went on foreign missions to award the Garter to Frederick VI of Denmark in 1822, John VI of Portugal in 1823, Charles X of France in 1825 and Nicholas I of Russia in 1827.

He was elected a Fellow of the Royal Society in June 1826.

Nayler's presence at the coronation of William IV in 1831 was to be one of his last official functions before his death in Hanover Square, Mayfair, almost two months later. He was buried in his family vault at the church of St John the Baptist in Gloucester.

== Arms ==
Coat of arms of George Nayler
Adopted 22 October 1808 Crest (1) On a mount vert a white courser in full speed 'in allusion to the office of Blanc Coursier Herald' charged with a pale gules & thereon a rose argent; (2) A lion's head erased sable transfixed with a spear bendways point downwards or & charged on the neck with a saltire or. Escutcheon Or, a pale plain between 2 lions sable & on a canton gules a white rose barbed & seeded proper. Symbolism White rose in allusion to the institution of the office of York herald by King Edward IV, a white rose barbed & seeded proper being the Badge of the Royal House of York Previous versions Previously: Or, a pale between 2 lions rampant sable (Naylor of Offord Darcy). Crest: A lion's head erased sable with a saltire or on the neck. Then changed to: Or, a pale engrailed between 2 lions sable & on a canton gules a white rose barbed & seeded proper; with quarterings for Park & Osman.

Heraldic offices
Preceded by John Brown	Blanc Coursier Herald; 1792–1831	Succeeded by Walter Blount
Preceded by Edmund Lodge	Bluemantle Pursuivant; 1793–1794	Succeeded by John Havers
Preceded by Benjamin Pingo	York Herald; 1794–1820	Succeeded by Charles Young
New title	King of Arms of the Royal Guelphic Order; 1815–1831	Succeeded by August Neubourg
New title	King of Arms of the Order of St Michael and St George; 1818–1831	Succeeded by Sir Charles Douglas
Preceded by George Harrison	Clarenceux King of Arms; 1820–1822	Succeeded by Ralph Bigland
Preceded by Sir Isaac Heard	Garter Principal King of Arms; 1822–1831	Succeeded by Sir Ralph Bigland
