= Thomas Pingo =

English medallist and engraver (1714–1776)

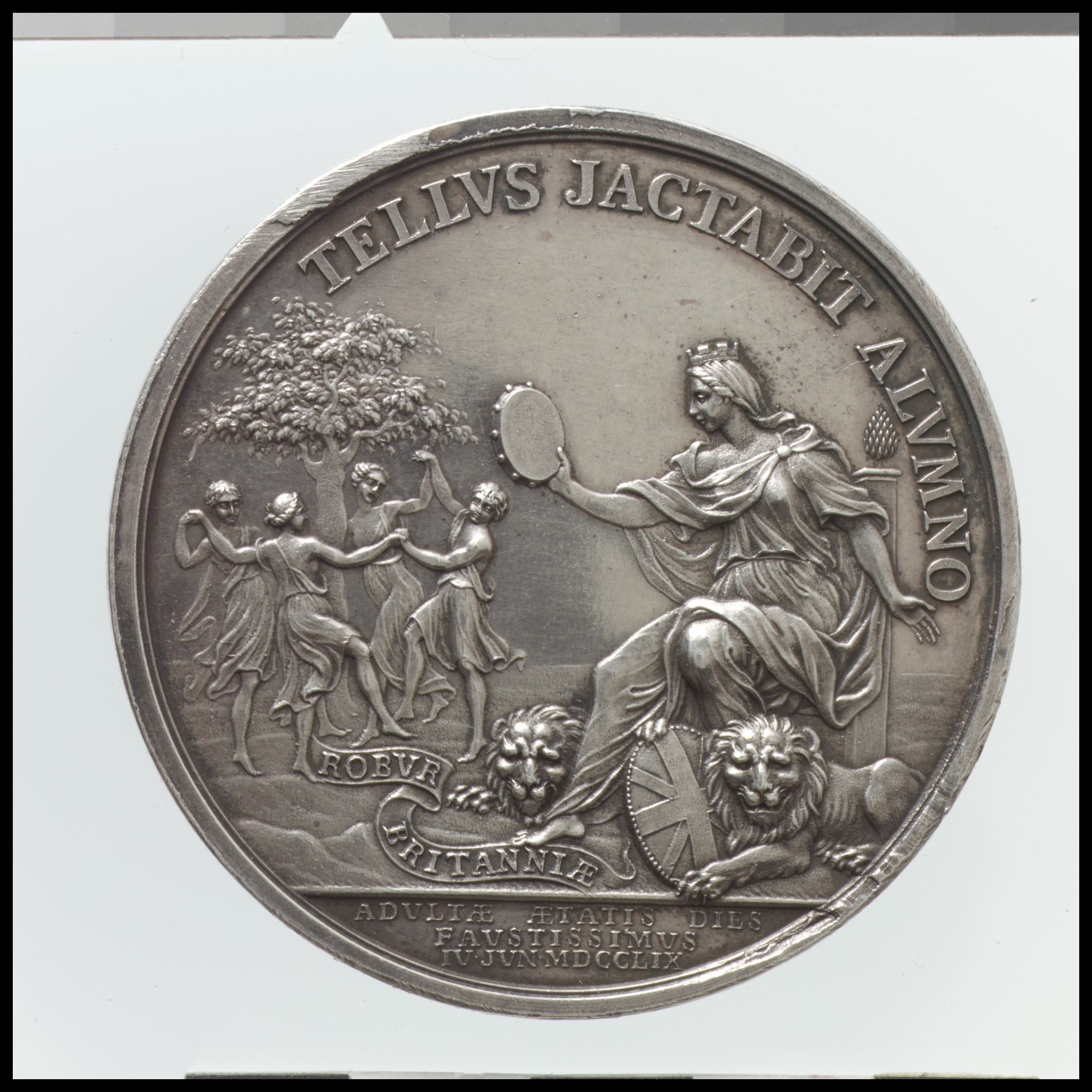
Accession of King George III medal verso

Thomas Pingo (1714–1776) was an English medallist and die engraver. He worked for the Royal Mint in London. Originally thought to have come from Italy in 1742, and born there in 1692, he was in fact the son of Thomas Pingo Sr (1688 – after 1743) of Plumbtree Court, London. The Pingo family first appeared in London in the 1650s in the Parish of St Martins-in-the-Fields.

His subjects included Charles Edward Stuart, King George III of Great Britain, and Prince Frederick, Duke of York and Albany, last Prince-Bishop of Osnabrück (1763–1827). His was appointed Assistant Engraver at the Mint in 1771. The same year, Pingo engraved the dies used for the Botetourt Medals of the College of William & Mary in Virginia.

== Private life ==
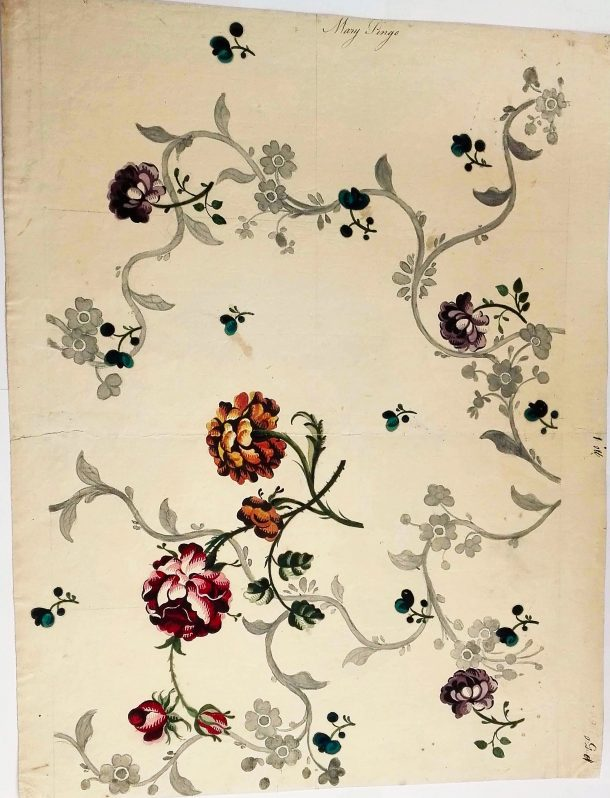
Mary Pingo's 1858 design

His daughter Mary Pingo was an artist and designer; baptised in 1741, she died unmarried in 1819. Their sons Lewis Pingo (baptised 1743–1830) and John Pingo (baptised 1738–1827) also became noted medallists, Lewis succeeding his father as the Mint's Assistant Engraver in 1776. Another son, Benjamin Pingo (1749–94), was Rouge Dragon Pursuivant (1780–1786) and York Herald (1786–1794) in the College of Arms.
