= Blanc Coursier Herald =

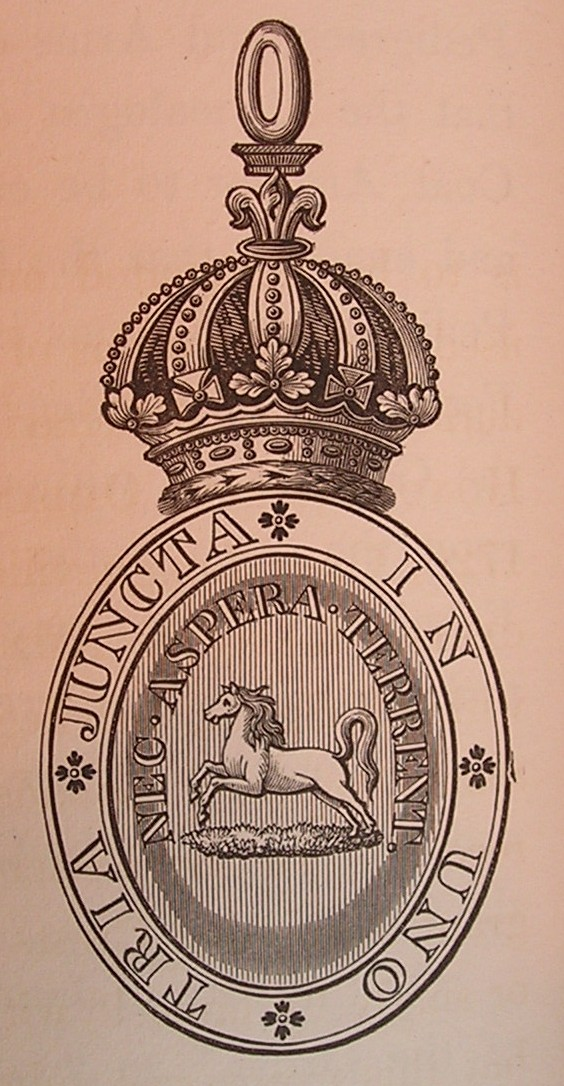
The badge of Blanc Coursier Herald, on the reverse of the badge of the Genealogist of the Order of the Bath

Blanc Coursier Herald was an officer of arms in England in the 18th and 19th centuries, associated with the Order of the Bath. The name of the office derives from the white horse in the arms of the Hanoverian monarchs.

One of the main motivations for the foundation of the Order of the Bath in 1725 was the ability it provided the then Prime Minister Sir Robert Walpole to show political patronage. This was afforded not only through appointments to the Order but also in the appointment of the officers of the Order. The original statutes provided for seven officers, Registrar, Secretary, Messenger, Dean, King of Arms, Usher and Genealogist, which were to be sinecures supported by annual fees from the members of the Order. However these offices were held at the pleasure of the Great Master of the Order, which meant the holders could be stripped of them at any time. To 'improve' this situation John Anstis, Garter King of Arms (who was responsible for proposing the Order and drafting the statutes) was able to get another statute passed which would attach heraldic offices to three of the above positions—the Genealogist would also become Blanc Coursier Herald, the Usher would also become Brunswick Herald, and the King of Arms of the Order of the Bath would also become Gloucester King of Arms, with heraldic jurisdiction over Wales. The advantage of this was that appointments to heraldic offices were by letters patent under the Great Seal from the King and were for life.

The office of Blanc Coursier Herald was created and "inseparably annexed, united and perpetually consolidated with the Office of Genealogist of [the Order of the Bath]" by a Statute of the Order of the Bath dated 14 January 1726. Blanc Coursier was to have all the rights and privileges enjoyed by a Royal herald, or by a herald of any prince or peer of the blood royal or by a herald of any nobleman. In addition he is described as being "Our Herald of Arms with Our dear entirely beloved grandson Prince William, First and Principal Companion of Our Said Most Honourable Order, and with the First and Principal Companion thereof for the time being". Blanc Coursier was therefore both a Royal herald ("Our Herald of Arms"), and also a private officer of arms as personal herald of the Principal Companion of the Order. As such, the coat of arms emblazoned on his tabard was that of Prince William.

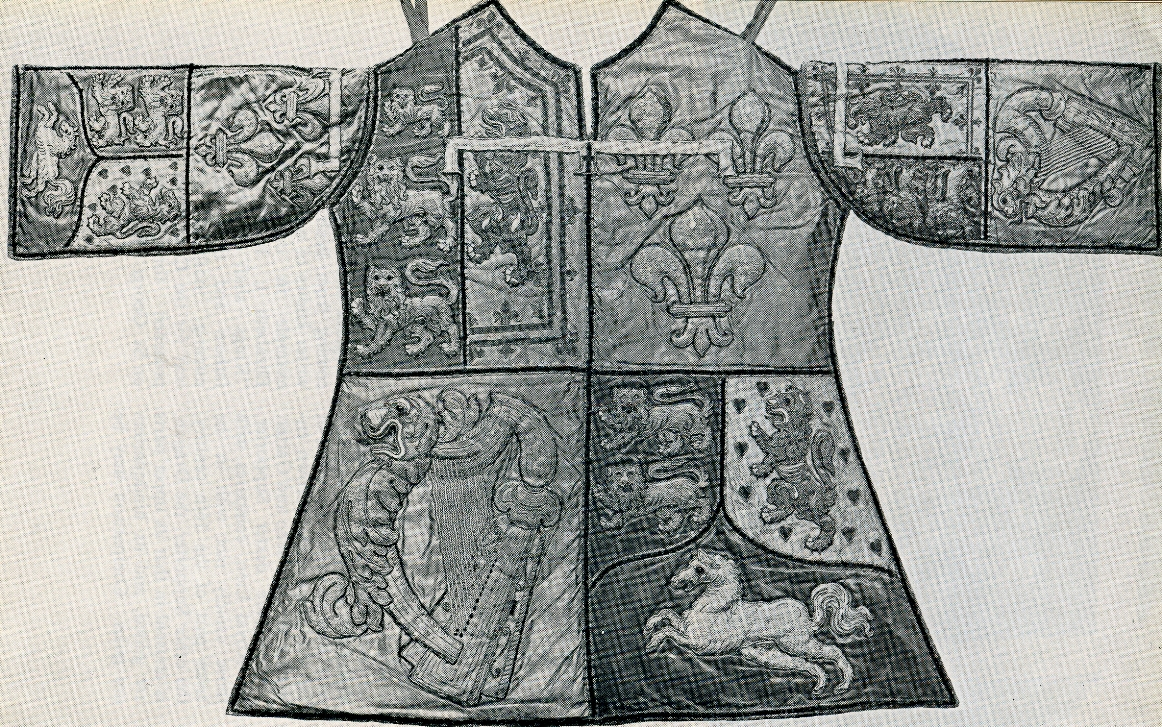
The tabard of Blanc Coursier John Anstis, created in 1727

Blanc Coursier's ceremonial installation did not take place until 1727, and by that time George II had succeeded his father as king. Prince William's arms then had a label of only three points (as the son of a Sovereign, rather than the five points of a grandson), the centre point charged with a cross gules. The arms on his tabard also show a differenced version of the Hanover quarter.

The first person to hold the office of Blanc Coursier was the son of John Anstis, also named John, who had been appointed Genealogist of the Order of the Bath at its inception, presumably because of the role his father had played in the Order's foundation.

When the Royal Guelphic Order was established in 1815 it originally had no officer of arms. Blanc Coursier at the time, Sir George Nayler, was able to have an additional statute passed appointing him King of Arms of the Order. His successor as Blanc Coursier, Walter Blount also held this position.

The office of Blanc Coursier was abolished in 1857 as part of a revision of the Statutes of the Order of the Bath.

== Holders of the Office ==
Arms	Name	Dates of office	Notes	Ref
	John Anstis, younger	1725–1754	Office created by his father, John Anstis, Garter King of Arms.	
	Sackville Fox	1755–1757	Younger brother of Lord Bingley (second creation)	
	John Suffield Brown	1757–1792		
	Sir George Nayler	1792–1831	Later became Clarenceux King of Arms	
	Walter Blount	1831–1857	Later became Clarenceux King of Arms. The office was abolished in 1857.	
