= Bigland =

Bigland is a surname, and may refer to:

- Alfred Bigland (1855–1936), English industrialist and politician, MP from 1910 to 1922
- Edward Bigland (c. 1620 – 1704), English lawyer and politician
- John Bigland (1750–1832), English schoolmaster and later an historian
- Matt Bigland, English musician
- Ralph Bigland (1712–1784), English officer of arms, antiquarian and cheesemaker
- Ralph Bigland (1757–1838), English officer of arms
