= Everard Green =

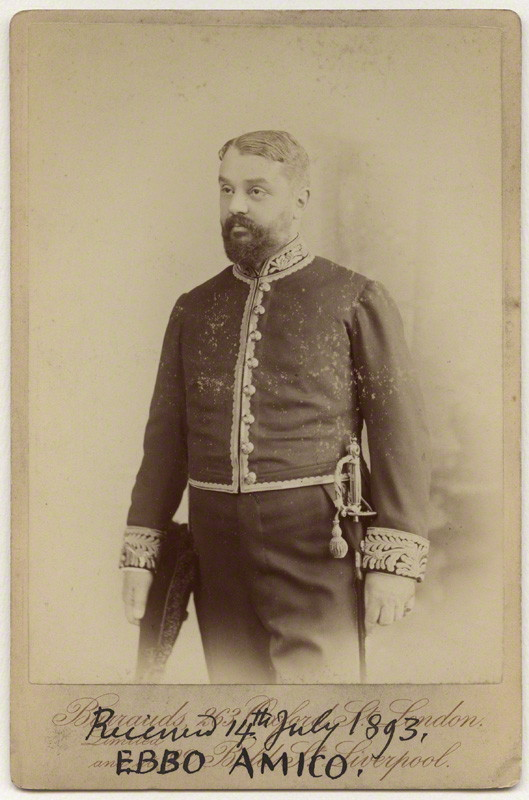
Everard Green, 1893 photo

Coat of arms of Everard Green

Everard Green, FSA (1844 – 1926) was an English officer of arms at the College of Arms in London. He began his heraldic career in 1893 with his appointment as Rouge Dragon Pursuivant of Arms in Ordinary. He continued in this post until 9 October 1911 when he was appointed Somerset Herald of Arms in Ordinary. He continued in this office until his death on 22 June 1926.

Green was born in 1844, the son of Charles and Mary Green, at Holdich House, Spalding.

== See also ==
- Heraldry
- Pursuivant
- Herald
