= Benjamin Pingo =

English Herald (1749–1794)

Arms of the Pingo Family

Benjamin Pingo (3 February 1749 – 8 July 1794), was a Herald and son of Thomas Pingo the engraver.

Pingo was baptised on 8 July 1749 in the parish of St. Andrew, Holborn. He was the son of Thomas Pingo and his wife, Mary, daughter of Benjamin Goldwyre of Romsey, Hampshire. His older brother was the engraver, Lewis Pingo.

In 1780 Pingo was appointed Rouge Dragon Pursuivant and served in that capacity until 1786. In 1786 he was appointed York Herald in which capacity he served until his death in 1794. Pingo died in a crush at the Haymarket Theatre on 3 February 1794. He left his manuscripts and works to the College of Heralds.

Heraldic offices
Preceded by Sir Ralph Bigland	Rouge Dragon Pursuivant; 1780–1786	Succeeded by James Monson Philips
Preceded by George Fletcher	York Herald; 1786–1794	Succeeded by Sir George Nayler
