= John Anstis, younger =

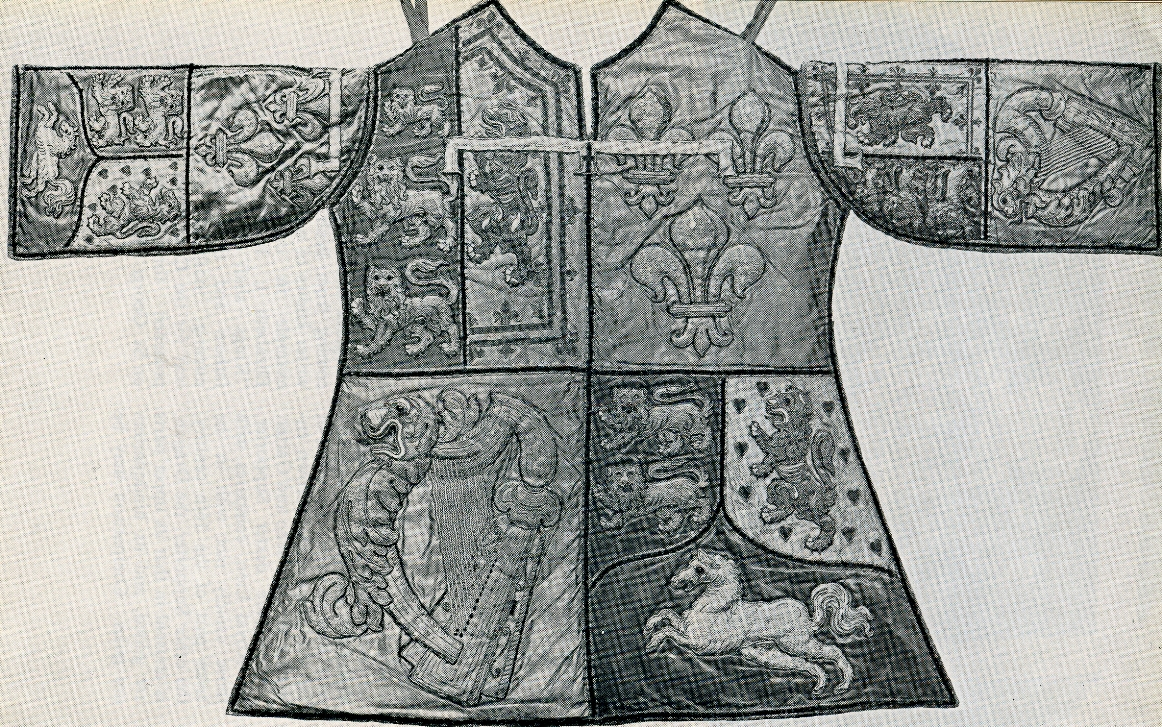
The tabard of Blanc Coursier John Anstis, created in 1727

John Anstis FSA (17 November 1708 – 5 December 1754) was an officer of arms at the College of Arms in London.

== Biography ==
Anstis was born in St Clement Danes, Westminster, and was the seventh child and eldest son of John Anstis and his wife, Elizabeth. He was educated at Westminster School and privately by Michael Maittaire. He graduated from Corpus Christi College, Oxford, in 1725. In May of that year he was made genealogist of the newly created Order of the Bath. On 6 October 1727, he was appointed Blanc Coursier Herald. This was a new office attached to that of the genealogist and first companion of the order; this creation was the work of his father, who had risen to the post of Garter Principal King of Arms. Later in 1727, Anstis was created joint Garter with his father and in 1733 he accompanied him to The Hague to invest the Prince of Orange with the Order of the Garter. In 1736 he was made a fellow of the Society of Antiquaries of London and he became the sole Garter King of Arms on his father's death in 1744. In 1749, he became a barrister of the Middle Temple, although he never practised law. The younger Anstis died a bachelor on 5 December 1754 at his house in Mortlake, Surrey, and was buried at Duloe, Cornwall.

== Arms ==
Coat of arms of John Anstis
Notes These were granted by Ward, Clarenceux, to the elder Anstis and his posterity on the motion of the younger Anstis and without the elder's knowledge. Neither father nor son used personal arms on their official seals as Garter. He was also granted quarterings for Smith and Cudlip, and in the Grant Book the coronet in the crest of Anstis is charged with 3 blue roundels. Adopted 10 March 1744 Crest 5 ostrich feathers argent in a king of arms' coronet or. Escutcheon Argent, a cross raguly gules between 4 doves azure, beaks and legs gules. Motto Arma Nobilitant Genus ("Arms make a family noble" or "Weapons make a family famous")

== See also ==
- Heraldry
