= John Anstis =

English politician and officer of arms (1669–1744)

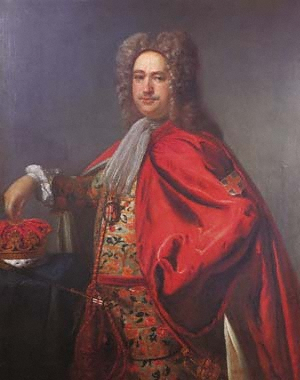
Painting of Garter Anstis from around 1725, by Thomas Hudson

John Anstis (29 August 1669 – 4 March 1744) was an English officer of arms, antiquarian and politician who sat in the House of Commons between 1702 and 1722. He rose to the highest heraldic office in England and became Garter King of Arms in 1718 after years of political manoeuvring.

== Early life ==
Anstis was born at St Neot, Cornwall on 29 August 1669. He was the first son of another John Anstis and his wife Mary, the daughter of George Smith. Anstis matriculated at Exeter College, Oxford, on 27 March 1685 and entered the Middle Temple on 31 January 1690. On 23 June 1695 he married Elizabeth, daughter and heir of Richard Cudlipp of Tavistock, Devon. They had eight sons and six daughters. Anstis was called to the bar on 19 May 1699.

== Political life ==
In March 1701, Anstis received permission from the Earl Marshal, Henry Howard, 7th Duke of Norfolk, to collect materials from the College of Arms library to assist in the defence of the jurisdiction of the Earl Marshal, which was under attack. Anstis was also elected to Parliament for St Germans in 1702. When the Garter King of Arms, Sir Thomas St George, died in March 1703 Anstis was in a position to advise Lady Howard on how to protect her son's rights from the threat of a royal nomination of a new Garter on the one hand and the assumption of the nomination by the deputy earl marshal. Sir Henry St George was nominated to be Garter and succeeded his brother in June 1703.

== Heraldic career ==
Anstis did not stand for election to Parliament in 1705. In May 1707 he was nominated Carlisle Herald of Arms Extraordinary and Norfolk Herald, as part of a plan to persuade Garter St George to administer the office jointly, with Anstis doing most of the work. In spite of the nomination, Anstis was never appointed to either post. His main rival to succeed St George was now John Vanbrugh, who had become Clarenceux King of Arms in March 1704 to strengthen his own claims to the office.

In December 1710 Anstis used a change in administration to try again at securing the Gartership. On 20 January 1711 he was re-elected to Parliament in a by-election as MP for St Mawes and was then elected as MP for Launceston at the 1713 general election. He changed his strategy with St George. He continued to secure offices related to public records for himself and he remained loyal to the Tory ministry in Parliament. With his influential political friends, Anstis was eventually able to obtain the promise of an appointment to the office of Garter King of Arms, on 2 April 1714.

Anstis was returned again as MP for Launceston in the 1715 general election and held the seat until the 1722. By the time that Sir Henry St George died in August 1715, the political situation had shifted away from Anstis's political connections: Vanbrugh was nominated to the office and took measures to secure the passage of his grant. In addition, on 30 September 1715 Anstis was arrested on suspicion of involvement in plotting a Jacobite uprising in Cornwall.

A protracted legal battle ensued as Anstis and Vanbrugh both claimed the title of Garter. Anstis eventually emerged victorious in May 1718. In 1724 he obtained an order for publishing, as editor and assisted by Elias Ashmole, the Register of the Most Noble Order of the Garter, From its Cover in Black Velvet Usually Called the "Black Book", which was printed at his own expense. This was a transcript of the Latin "Black Book of the Garter", the earliest surviving register of that order, written in about 1535, now in the Royal Collection at Windsor Castle. In the preface to his work he wrote:

While we, with sensible regret, complain of the loss of these old annals whereby we are deprived of a great treasure, it hath been judged expedient to preserve the remains which have happily escaped this shipwreck. And therefore the eldest register remaining in the archives is now exhibited to publick view, less by the currency of time or any unforeseen accident it might be subject to the same unhappy fate. The original manuscript is a very large pompous volume in folio written in an handsome strong character on vellom, having the initial letters of each paragraph, together with the names of the companions and of the knights nominated in scrutinies, beautifully embellished with gold, placed on squares of gold and azure alternately...It hath been shewn in the introduction when and by whom this register was compiled and from what materials it was collected.

During the course of his research of the Order of the Garter, Anstis rediscovered a forgotten royal honour. Through his friendship with the Duke of Montagu the idea to revive the Order of the Bath came to fruition. This led to his Observations Introductory to an Historical Essay on the Knighthood of the Bath in 1725 and to Anstis's drawing up the statutes for the new order.

It was, perhaps, Anstis's Toryism rather than any genuine failure in heraldic knowledge that led a prominent Whig nobleman (possibly Henry Herbert, 9th Earl of Pembroke or Philip Stanhope, 4th Earl of Chesterfield) to direct at him the rebuke, "Thou silly fellow! Thou dost not know thy own silly business!"

Anstis duly presided over the coronation of George II in 1727. In 1728, he embarked on extensive research to prove that his family was related to Archbishop Henry Chichele, the founder of All Souls College, Oxford. This research could have entitled his son, John Anstis, to a fellowship at the college; which was blocked by Archbishop William Wake, Anstis did have his son made Blanc Coursier Herald in 1727. In 1737 he secured the succession of his office of Garter to John the younger.

== Death and legacy ==
Anstis died on 4 March 1744 at Mortlake, Surrey. He was buried at Duloe in Cornwall on 23 March according to his wishes. Anstis was an indefatigable antiquarian whose correspondence with fellow scholars such as Thomas Hearne and Humfrey Wanley testifies to his wide interests. He left a mass of unpublished papers, including over 8,000 pages of notes on English history, Jurisprudence, Chronology, Heraldry, Ecclesiastical and Military Affairs. Many of his papers were sold in 1768 and in 1774 and are now held in the British Library, the Bodleian Library, and All Souls, Oxford.

== Arms ==
Coat of arms of John Anstis
Notes These were granted by Ward, Clarenceux, to the elder Anstis and his posterity on the motion of the younger Anstis and without the elder's knowledge. Neither father nor son used personal arms on their official seals as Garter. Adopted 31 January 1741 Crest 5 ostrich feathers argent in a king of arms' coronet or. Escutcheon Argent, a cross raguly gules between 4 doves azure, beaks and legs gules. Motto Arma Nobilitant Genus ("Arms make a family noble" or "Weapons make a family famous")

== Bibliography ==
- John Anstis. The Register of the Most Noble Order of the Garter. (London, 1724).
- Edward Cruickshanks. Anstis, John. Parliament Records (London, 1715–54).
- Walter H. Godfrey and Sir Anthony Wagner, The College of Arms, Queen Victoria Street: being the sixteenth and final monograph of the London Survey Committee. (London, 1963).
- Mark Noble, A History of the College of Arms. (London, 1805).
- Sir Anthony Wagner. A Catalogue of English Mediaeval Rolls of Arms. Harleian Society (London, 1950).
- Sir Anthony Wagner. Heralds of England: a History of the Office and College of Arms. (London, 1967).
- Anthony Wagner and A. L. Rowse. John Anstis: Garter King of Arms (London, 1992).

Parliament of England
Preceded by Henry Fleming; Richard Edgcumbe	Member of Parliament for St Germans; 1702–1705; With: Henry Fleming	Succeeded by Henry Fleming; Samuel Rolle
Parliament of Great Britain
Preceded by John Tredenham; Richard Onslow	Member of Parliament for St Mawes; 1711–1713; With: Richard Onslow	Succeeded by Edward Rolt; Francis Scobell
Preceded by Francis Scobell; George Clarke	Member of Parliament for Launceston; 1713–1722; With: Edward Herle 1713–1721; Alexander Pendarves 1721–1722	Succeeded by Alexander Pendarves; John Freind
