= Michael Trappes-Lomax =

English poet, soldier, historian (1900–1972)

Michael Roger Trappes-Lomax FSA

Rouge Dragon Pursuivant
- In office 1946–1951
- Preceded by: Eric Neville Geijer
- Succeeded by: Robin de la Lanne-Mirrlees

Somerset Herald
- In office 1951 – 1967 (retired)
- Preceded by: George Bellew
- Succeeded by: Rodney Dennys

Personal details
- Born: 16 October 1900
- Died: 24 November 1972 (aged 72)
- Education: University of Oxford

Military service
- Allegiance: United Kingdom
- Rank: major
- Unit: Scots Guards

Michael Roger Trappes-Lomax, FSA (16 October 1900 – 24 November 1972) was a poet, soldier, historian, and officer of arms at the College of Arms in London. He was the third son of Richard Trappes-Lomax and during World War II, served as a major in the Scots Guards.

== Life ==
As an undergraduate at the University of Oxford he was a member of the Officer Training Corps, after graduation he was commissioned a second lieutenant in the 4th/5th battalion of the East Lancashire Regiment (a Territorial Army battalion) in April 1927. He was promoted to lieutenant in April 1930, but later in the year he transferred to the Supplementary Reserve of Officers, and became a Scots Guard. He resigned his commission in 1935, but in 1938, with World War II approaching, he was re-commissioned.

He saw action in Egypt and served as Aide-de-camp to General Sir James Marshal Cornwall. On his formal retirement in 1951 he was granted the honorary rank of major.

Shortly after the war, Trappes-Lomax began his heraldic career with an appointment as Rouge Dragon Pursuivant of Arms in Ordinary on 28 August 1946. He held this post until 1951 when he was promoted to the office of Somerset Herald of Arms in Ordinary. It was in this capacity that he took part in the proclamation and Coronation of Queen Elizabeth II. He retired from this position in 1967.

Trappes-Lomax also had much talent in his literary endeavours and during his lifetime he published works of both a factual and fictional nature. He died unmarried on 24 November 1972 after a long and active life. It was said of him that he undertook everything he did with enthusiasm and enjoyment.

== See also ==
- Heraldry
- Pursuivant
- Herald

Heraldic offices
Preceded by Eric Geijer	Rouge Dragon Pursuivant; 1946 – 1951	Succeeded by Robin de La Lanne-Mirrlees
Preceded by Sir George Bellew	Somerset Herald; 1951 – 1967	Succeeded by Rodney Dennys
