= Ralph Bigland (born 1757) =

Sir Ralph Bigland (né Owen; 1 May 1757 – 14 July 1838) was an English herald. He was the son of Joseph Owen of Salford, Lancashire, and Elizabeth-Maria Owen (née Bigland).

In 1774, he received royal licence to take the surname and arms of Bigland. He did this out of respect to his maternal uncle, Ralph Bigland, English Officer of Arms, at his uncle's desire. That same year, he became Rouge Dragon Pursuivant, the first of five heraldic appointments he was to hold in the College of Arms.

Like his uncle, he rose to the most senior office, being appointed Garter Principal King of Arms from 1831 (the same year he was created Knight Bachelor) until his death. He was the last to hold all three Kingships of the College of Arms in succession.

== Arms ==
Coat of arms of Sir Ralph Bigland
Notes Same arms as his uncle and namesake. Adopted Exemplified 1774 Crest On a torse or & azure a lion passant looking backwards gules & holding in the dexter paw an ear of big or. Escutcheon Quarterly with a crescent for difference; (1) azure, 2 ears of big (wheat) or (Bigland); (2) argent, 2 bars with 3 scallops in chief gules (Errington); (3) argent, 10 roundels gules (Babington); (4) or, a fret sable (Ward). Motto Spe Labor Levis ("Hope for light work")

Heraldic offices
Preceded by Thomas Locke	Rouge Dragon Pursuivant; 1774–1780	Succeeded by Benjamin Pingo
Preceded by Peter Dore	Richmond Herald; 1780–1803	Succeeded by Joseph Hawker
Preceded by George Harrison	Norroy King of Arms; 1803–1822	Succeeded by Edmund Lodge
Preceded by Sir George Nayler	Clarenceux King of Arms; 1822–1831	Succeeded by Sir William Woods
Preceded by Sir George Nayler	Garter Principal King of Arms; 1831–1838	Succeeded by Sir William Woods
