= Gerald Bracey =

American education policy researcher

Gerald Watkins Bracey
- Born: August 12, 1940; Williamsburg, Virginia
- Died: October 20, 2009 (aged 69); Port Townsend, Washington
- Occupation: Education Policy Researcher
- Known for: Bracey Report

Gerald Watkins Bracey (August 12, 1940 – October 20, 2009) was an American education policy researcher. He is best known for the annual "Bracey Report" in which he analyzed current trends in education, often in opposition to prevailing educational policies of the day. The reports were published over a seventeen-year period. The last report was unfinished, and his colleagues at the National Education Policy Center conducted the final revisions and published it in November 2009.

== Early life and education ==
Gerald Watkins Bracey was born on August 12, 1940. He grew up in Williamsburg, Virginia with his parents, Bettye and Gerald Bracey. Gerald Bracey was amazed at his own children’s high school experience when compared with his own education in the late 1940s and 1950s. He was amazed that his daughter, during her junior year at a high school in Colorado, was already studying calculus and the writer Ibsen, two topics to which he himself had not been exposed to until college. He also remarked that the complicated science fair experiments that he observed were “[l]ight years removed from the simple machines, simple equations, and phyla to be memorized in [his] high school days.”

Bracey attended the College of William and Mary and received his Bachelor of Arts degree in psychology in 1962. upon graduating from William & Mary, he received the Botetourt Medal for academic achievement. He went on to pursue his Ph.D. in psychology at Stanford University, which he eventually received in 1967. Bracey lived in Hong Kong for a year between 1965 and 1966 and traveled around Southeast Asia, the Middle East, and Europe before returning to the United States to finish his doctorate degree.

== Career ==
While Gerald Bracey is most well known for his work as a critic of educational policies, that distinction came later in his life. After receiving his PhD in Psychology from Stanford in 1967, he first worked as a research psychologist at the Early Childhood Research group for the Educational Testing Service in Princeton, New Jersey. He was there for three years before moving on to Indiana University in 1970, working as both an assistant professor at the School of Education and Associate Director at the Institute for Child Study until 1973. He worked at Indiana University for another three years, and then decided to travel the world from 1973 to 1977, earning his living from 1974 to 1975 by working as an adjunct of the European Division of University of Maryland’s Psychology department. He supplemented his income by working as a freelance writer, reviewing various restaurants during the four years he was abroad.

In 1977, he returned to the United States and became the Director of Research, Evaluation and Testing at the Virginia Department of Education in Richmond, VA. During his tenure at the Virginia Department of Education he began writing a column titled “Research” for the Phi Delta Kappan in 1984; he continued writing for the Phi Delta Kappan until his death in 2009.

In 1986 he began working for the Cherry Creek Schools in Engelwood, Colorado as their Director of Research and Evaluation. He left this position in 1991, the same year in which he wrote what later became known as the First Bracey Report. The first Bracey Report began as an article in the Phi Delta Kappan called “Why Can't They Be Like We Were?” The article was noticed by The New York Times, Washington Post, Education Week, USA Today, and the Bush administration. The following year, Bracey wrote a sequel to the article. Originally titled “The True Crisis in Public Education”, the editors changed the titled to “The Second Bracey Report on the Condition of Public Education”, and requested that The Bracey Report become an annual event. Bracey wrote the report every year thereafter. He was working on the 2009 version of the report, which comes out every October, when he died. In 1991, Bracey also founded the Education Disinformation Detection and Reporting Agency (EDDRA) website, whose purpose was to use “the real-time power of the Net to debunk dis- and mis-information about public schools.” He became a regular blogger for the Huffington Post in 2006.

== Later life ==
Research and Publications: A lot of Bracey’s work during his later years was published by the National Education Policy Center (NEPC) at University of Colorado in Boulder, Colorado, including Policy briefs and Legacy Publications There were also some non-NEPC Publications.

Bracey also had a number of books published in his later years. Among them were: Final Exam: A Study of the Perpetual Scrutiny of American Education (1995); Setting the Record Straight: Responses to Misconceptions About Public Education in America (1997); Bail Me Out! Handling Difficult Data and Tough Questions About Public Schools (2000); and Reading Educational Research: How to Avoid Getting Statistically Snookered (2006). “A booklet, “Understanding Education Statistics: It's Easier (And More Important) Than You Think” was published in early 1997 by Educational Research Service and a revised edition appeared in 2003.”

Gerald Bracey finished his last column on October 20 before he died. He had intended to publish it on his Huffington Post blog. In the column, Bracey was critical of U.S. Secretary of Education Arne Duncan, focussing on Duncan’s years running Chicago Public Schools. Bracey focused on "Duncan's decision to outsource the work of trained physical education and health education teachers to the "Save-A-Life Foundation." Subsequent investigations showed that Save-A-Life was fraudulent, but “Duncan made no effort, following the revelations regarding the foundation, to retrieve the public money he had authorized be paid to Save-A-Life."

In 1994–95 Bracey was the first Distinguished Fellow for the Agency for Instructional Technology. Bracey won the American Educational Research Association's "Relating Research to Practice" award in 2003 for his interpretive scholarship of education research. This award recognizes an individual’s achievements in published works that appear in sources other than peer-reviewed journals or books.

In 2006, Bracey began blogging for The Huffington Post; he blogged for them until 2009. He would use the site to post some of his most critical essays. His last post for The Huffington Post criticized the pro-charter school editorials written by The Washington Post and Wall Street Journal. In April 2009, Bracey began using Twitter as another outlet for his analyses of the education system. One of his last tweets read: "Thinking that the light at the end of the education tunnel is a standards freight train coming our way. Gonna hurt bad."

== Personal life and family ==
Gerald Bracey grew up in Williamsburg, Virginia, where he also attended college at the College of William and Mary. Bracey traveled internationally during the 1960s and 70s, visiting countries in Asia, Africa, and Europe. Bracey also lived abroad in Hong Kong between 1965 and 1966, as well as in Greece. He is noted to have developed a strong penchant for traveling during the 1960s, desiring to “travel without itinerary until the money ran out.” Gerald Bracey also developed expertise in international cuisine, an interest he put to use by writing restaurant reviews. In 1964, he married his first wife, Dorothy Irene Heid, an anthropologist who studied at Harvard. They eventually divorced. Later in his adult life, Bracey lived in Northern Virginia and Port Townsend, Washington. His second marriage was to Iris Bracey, with whom he raised two stepchildren, Noel Petrie and Kira Mekeburg. Iris Bracey was with him at the time of his unexpected death in Port Townsend. It is possible that his death was related to prostate cancer. He died in his sleep at the age of 69.

== Ideas associated with Gerald Bracey ==
No Child Left Behind and Standardized Testing

One critique of education that Bracey was associated with was the No Child Left Behind Act(NCLB), which he claimed to be failing. Bracey’s criticized NCLB, claiming, “NCLB did not have a significant impact on improving reading and math achievement across the nation and states...NCLB has not helped the nation and states significantly narrow the achievement gap.” One particular concern of Bracey’s was the emphasis NCLB put on standardized tests. According to Bracey, standardized tests measure only a small amount of what makes education meaningful; tests fail to measure creativity, motivation, critical thinking skills, curiosity, and numerous other characteristics that describe an engaged learner. Bracey’s concern was that leaders in the field of education increased use of standardized tests was not matched with an increase in understanding how tests can be used. Bracey called for education researchers to provide a clear and objective description of what a standardized test can and cannot do, how these tests are constructed, and how the tests are used in education.

Simpson’s Paradox

One major statistical paradox that is prevalent in several books and articles written by Bracey is Simpson’s Paradox. In essence, this paradox describes a situation in which differing sample sizes between two samples can cause one to conclude that one condition is preferable to another in aggregate even when it is worse under both samples. Bracey took it upon himself to educate readers of educational research about the risks of this paradox. He held that much statistics-based research in the field of education made use of this paradox resulting in misinformation.

== Published works ==
=== Books ===
Bail Me Out!: Handling Difficult Data and Tough Questions About Public Schools (2000)

This book explains the misconceptions for those who are losing confidence for the public educations in America, and proves with data that the claims on low performance of public schools are only half-truths.

The War Against America's Public Schools: Privatizing Schools, Commercializing Education (2001)

“This book provides a comprehensive view of forces such as charters, vouchers, educational management organizations (EMO's), and private schools that are altering the future of public education.”, it also talks about the performances of American public schools on Achievement tests, and explores changes in education.

What You Should Know About the War Against America's Public Schools (2002)

This book is published a year after the publication of The War Against America's Public Schools: Privatizing Schools, Commercializing Education. This book mainly talks about the effect of private schools, charter and vouchers on the future of public education.

On the Death of Childhood and the Destruction of Public Schools: The Folly of Today's Education Policies and Practices (2003)

In this book, Bracey provides statistical data to review history of public schools, and criticizes today’s public education. Bracey also questions on the “failing schools, and talks about “summer loss” for the students from those schools.

Setting the Record Straight: Responses to Misconceptions About Public Education in the U.S. (2004)

In this book, Bracey raises questions about public schools in America. The topics include school funding, test scores, school qualities, and Bracey answered the questions with statistical data and comprehensive explanations.

Reading Educational Research: How to Avoid Getting Statistically Snookered (2006)

In this book, Bracey explains many statistical concepts in easy-to understand language, and also offered 32 principles on data interpretation.

Education Hell: Rhetoric vs. Reality (2009)

This book is about misconceptions about education and testing in America, and the necessity of teaching students essential skills even though not all of them will be measured on those multiple choice tests.

=== The Bracey Reports ===
2009:

This report considered the following three questions.
1. Can high-quality schools eliminate the achievement gap between whites and minorities?
2. Is mayoral control of public schools an improvement over the more common elected board governance systems?
3. Will higher standards improve the performance of public schools?

2008:

This report examines ED in 08, an attempt to make use of education in the 2008 presidential campaign, the No Child Left Behind Act, a study from the Jack Kent Cooke :Foundation entitled Achievement Trap, controversies surround the Programme of International Student Assessment (PISA), and conflicts in the Reading First program among other topics.

2007:

This report examines the errors of criticism about American education today with parallels drawn to the mistaken reaction to America being beaten into space after the Sputnik launch in 1957.

2006:

This report examines misleading metrics, No Child Left Behind, and criteria for high performance at various schools.

2005:

This report again examines the implementation of the federal No Child Left Behind Act, specifically related to atrocities committed by states with regards to the testing requirement and about the issue of funding. The report also looks at trend in the NAEP and conservatives’ reaction to charter school performance among other topics.

2004:

This report mostly examines the implementation of the No Child Left Behind Act, specifically the choice provisions and the ‘Forum on Ideas to Improve the NCLB Accountability Provisions’ which was held in July 2004 among other topics.

2003:

This report discusses problems with the implementation of No Child Left Behind regarding the condition of adequate yearly progress (AYP) and the highly qualified teacher requirements. It also discusses developments in vouchers, testing, charter schools and other topics.

2002:

This report discusses testing as well as contends that NCLB is a trap that will lead to calls for the privatization of more schools. It also discusses an attack on tuition tax credits for public schools and discusses in the decline of Edison Schools, Inc.

2001:

This report takes a look at the obsession with standardized testing, at the newly available NAEP data, and at international comparisons.

2000:

This report marks the tenth anniversary of the Bracey Report. It begins with a brief history of the Bracey Report and includes his famous ‘Golden Apple’ awards.

1999:

This report looks at topics such as public schools compared with private schools based on NAEP scores, Simpson’s Paradox, class-size controversy, Charter schools, and the tragedy at Columbine High School.

1998:

This report examines in depth the flaws with the Third International Mathematics and Science Study (TIMSS). The issues brought up include how journalist understand the TIMSS, how the United States Department of Education presented the data, and the failure of quality controls in TIMSS.

1997:

This report considers the First International Adult Literacy Survey and the surprising results. Among adults aged 16–65, 20.7% of US adults are at the lowest reading level, level one, while only 3.8% of US adults are at the highest reading level, level five.

1996:

This report includes a comparison of Japanese and United States schools, as well as discussions of school choice, charter schools, and activity by Secretary of Education Richard Riley.

1995:

This report discusses the difference between rhetoric, data, and reason with respect to education. Topics also include the ongoing TIMSS test, domestic data, and the relationship between the economy and education.

1994:

This report discusses the myths surrounding American education. Topics include presentation of real data, levels of performance on academic indicators as actually reflecting demographic factors, job prospects, and the role of media in the perception of education.

1993:

This report states that the good news about U.S. schools is continually ignored while the real issues facing the country, such as crushing poverty and a faltering economy continue to worsen.

1992:

This report discusses the difficulties facing an education system that operates in an era of prevalent disinformation and a time of social decline.

1991:

This report, the first Bracey Report, examines a wide variety of topics. These include dropout rates, per pupil expenditures, special education costs, employment trends, and other indicators to demonstrate that U.S. education is not in the poor condition that critics claim.

=== Articles ===
Bracey has written numerous articles for academic journals. One notable journal in which Bracey was involved with was Phi Delta Kappan, in which he held a monthly column for many years. Other regular publications include a blog in the Huffington Post and an article in the journal Principal Leadership. In addition, Bracey had a Twitter account. Other journals in which Bracey was published include Education Week, The Chronicle of Higher Education, and The American School Board Journal. A partial list of articles published by Bracey can be found below, organized by journal.
