= William Arthur White =

19th-century British diplomat

The Right Honorable Sir William Arthur White GCB GCMG PC
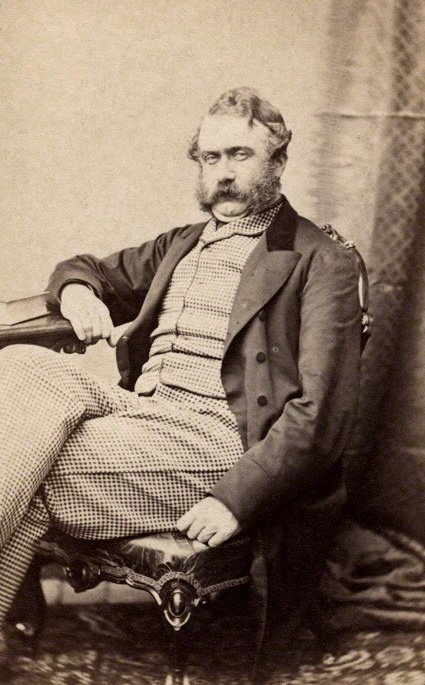

British Ambassador to the Ottoman Empire
- In office 11 October 1886 – 28 December 1891
- Monarch: Victoria
- Prime Minister: Robert Gascoyne-Cecil
- Preceded by: Sir Edward Thornton
- Succeeded by: Sir Clare Ford

Personal details
- Born: 13 February 1824 Puławy, Kingdom of Poland
- Died: 28 December 1891 (aged 67) Berlin, German Empire
- Resting place: Brookwood Cemetery
- Spouse: Katherine Marie Kendzior (m. 1867)
- Education: Trinity College, Cambridge

Sir William Arthur White GCB GCMG PC (13 February 1824 – 28 December 1891) was a British diplomat. White entered the diplomatic service in 1857 at the age of 33, and between 1857 and 1886 had postings in Warsaw, Danzig, Belgrade, and Bucharest. In 1886 he was given the ambassadorship in Constantinople, which he held for five years until his death on 28 December 1891 at the age of 67.

== Early life ==
William Arthur White was born in Puławy on 13 February 1824 to Arthur Bourne White (1788–1856) and Elizabeth Lila Gardiner (1798–1849). The couple had one other child who died in infancy. The White family traced its lineage to Hugh White of Dublin and his wife Mary Stewart, sister of Annesley Stewart, 6th Baronet Stewart. Arthur White served in the British Consular and Colonial Services.

William's mother was Elizabeth Lila Gardiner (1798–1849), the daughter of British soldier William Neville Gardiner (1748–1806) and his second wife Lucy O'Moore (died 1849). Gardiner served in the Foreign Office twice as the Minister in Warsaw, in 1784 and 1794. Following William Gardiner's death in Nova Scotia in 1806, Lucy and her daughter continued to live in Poland. They first lived on the estate Góra Puławska, and later held under lease the estate Wysock, the country residence of the Czartoryski family. It is likely that Gardiner had formed an arrangement with the Czartoryskis in which they would provide protection for his widow and daughter. The Czartoryskis played a large part in the upbringing of Elizabeth. The family owned considerable estates in Poland.

Arthur White moved to Poland sometime in the 1810s to work on the Czartoryski estate as an exporter of grain and timber. It is possible, however, that he was also serving as an agent for Adam Jerzy Czartoryski to help form ties between England and the Slavic countries. It was probably Adam Czartoryski's idea for Eliza Gardiner to marry Arthur White.

Following the November Uprising of 1830, a death warrant was placed on Adam Czartoryski, who subsequently fled to Paris where he lived in exile the remainder of his life. Arthur thus no longer had a purpose in Poland, and further, was a marked man due to his affiliation with the exiled prince. In 1832, Viscount Palmerston secured White the position of Vice-Consul in Memel, although he was quickly removed based on a request from the Prussian government. At this time Arthur returned to London. It was not until 1836 the White received another consular appointment, which this time was to Granville. In April 1840 he was transferred to the Colonial Service and the next month was gazetted secretary at Trinidad. Arthur died in Paris on 24 March 1856.

William spent his youth in Poland and was raised Roman Catholic, his mother's religion. It is likely that Eliza had acquired Catholicism from her mother, whose name suggests she was likely Irish Catholic. William was initially educated in Warsaw. The three men who looked after his interests—his father, Prince Czartoryski, and the Prince's supporter Lord Dudley Stuart—believed William should have a proper English education. As such, William was sent to King William's College on the Isle of Man, and in October 1841 to Trinity College, Cambridge. White spent two years at Cambridge, but was not permitted to obtain a degree because he was a Catholic. In 1843 he returned to Poland to live with his mother and grandmother. His friend Henry Cadman Jones accompanied him back and stayed with the family for three months.

After his return to Poland, William's grandmother purchased him an estate near Puławy at which time he became a landowner. White was an unsuccessful farmer and had numerous problems with his peasants. It is also possible that in the 1840s and '50s White was acting as an agent for the British government. During the Crimean War, he was considered a suspect by the Russian government and was placed under close supervision.

== Diplomatic career ==
From 1843 to 1857 he lived in Poland as a country gentleman, but in the latter year he accepted a post in the British consulate in Warsaw, and had almost at once to perform the duties of acting consul-general. The January Uprising in 1863 gave him an opportunity of showing his immense knowledge of Eastern politics and his combination of diplomatic tact with resolute determination. He was promoted in 1864 to the post of consul at Danzig. The Eastern Question was, however, the great passion of his life, and in 1875 he succeeded in getting transferred to Belgrade as Agent and Consul-General to Serbia.

In 1878 he was made British Agent at Bucharest. In 1884 he was offered by Lord Granville the choice of the legation at Rio de Janeiro or Buenos Aires, and in 1885 Lord Salisbury, who was then at the Foreign Office, urged him to go to Peking, pointing out the increasing importance of that post. White's devoted friend, Sir Robert Morier, wrote in the same sense. But White, who was already acting as ambassador ad interim at Constantinople, decided to wait; and during this year he rendered one of his most conspicuous services.

It was largely owing to his efforts that the war between Serbia and Bulgaria was prevented from spreading into a universal conflagration, and that the unification of Bulgaria and what was then known as eastern Rumelia was accepted by the powers. In the following year he was rewarded with the embassy at Constantinople. He was the first Roman Catholic appointed to a British embassy since the Protestant Reformation.

He pursued consistently the policy of counteracting Russian influence in the Balkans by erecting a barrier of independent states animated with a spirit of national life, and by supporting Austrian interests in the East. To the furtherance of this policy he brought knowledge of all the under-currents of Oriental intrigue, which his mastery of languages enabled him to derive not only from the newspapers, of which he was an assiduous reader, but from the obscurest sources. His very straightforward style enabled him to outcompete his less-talented rivals.

The official honors bestowed on him culminated in 1888 when he was made a Knight Grand Cross of the Order of the Bath, and was given a seat on the Privy Council. He was still ambassador at Constantinople when he was attacked by influenza during a visit to Berlin, where he died at the Hotel Kaiserhof on 28 December 1891. Initially White was interred in the crypt of St Hedwig's Cathedral in Berlin. However, in 1938 his daughter paid for the coffins of her father and mother to be shipped to England, where they were reinterred in Brookwood Cemetery, Surrey.

== Personal life ==
While posted to Danzig, White met Katherine Marie Kendzior (1840–1902), the daughter of a German tobacconist named Lewis Kendzior. William and Katherine married in 1867. In his biography of White, Sutherland quotes Edward Grosvenor, who wrote,

Nor must Lady White be forgotten. A main contribution to all his success was that lovely and genial lady who for twenty-five years never faltered at his side. It is reported that he once said the greatest achievement of his life was winning the hand of Miss Kendzior at Dantzic. The graceful suavity and tact, and at times, because of physical ailments, the fortitude and even heroism with which Lady White, fulfilled all the social requirements of her station, contributed in large measure to the official success of the embassy.

More recently, Helen McCarthy described Lady White's difficulties in her role. She explained,

Lady White, wife of Sir William, Britain's ambassador in Constantinople between 1886 and 1891, was born plain Katherine Kendzior, the daughter of a German tobacconist – and she was never allowed to forget it. The elevation of one of such humble means to the rank of ambassadress was highly unusual for the times. It was explained in part by the almost equally unconventional career of her husband, who entered the Consular Service at the relatively late age of thirty-three and was amongst only a small handful of consuls who crossed the rickety bridge into the mainstream Diplomatic Service. Wives inevitably found themselves on the receiving end of the residual snobbery directed towards such upstarts. According to Charles Hardinge, who served under Sir William in Constantinople, Lady White was 'a common woman greatly lacking in dignity and savoir-faire.' She was apparently seen in the embassy kitchen collecting scraps from the supper table after a ball, and Hardinge once spied her in the main street of Pera buying live turkeys 'and feeling which was the fattest.' This undignified behaviour, he recalled with distaste, 'did not redound to her credit as Ambassadress.'

William and Katherine's first child was Lila Lucy Catherine Mary (1867–1941). Lila was first married to Kammarherre (Chamberlain) Carl Emmanuel von Geijer, a Swedish envoy working in Constantinople. Their son Eric Neville Geijer (1894–1941) became a guards officer and herald. Following the death of her first husband, in 1899 Lila married Shelley Scarlett, 5th Baron Abinger, becoming the Baroness Abinger. On his mother's side, Lord Abinger was the grandson of Sir Percy Shelley, 3rd Baronet, and the great grandson of Percy Bysshe Shelley and Mary Wollstonecraft Shelley. Katherine Kendzior died on 13 June 1902 while staying with her son-in-law and daughter at the Shelley estate, Boscombe Manor, in Bournemouth. The Whites also had a son Neville William Arthur Philip Hugh (1870–1953). In 1890 Neville moved to Canada and joined the North-West Mounted Police. He later settled in Fort Saskatchewan.

== Notes ==
Diplomatic posts
Preceded by John Augustus Longworth	Agent and Consul-General to Serbia; 1875 – 1879	Succeeded by Gerard Francis Gould
Preceded by Sir Edward Thornton	Ambassador to the Ottoman Empire; 1886 – 1891	Succeeded by Sir Clare Ford
