= Walter Blount (officer of arms) =

Coat of arms of Walter Blount as Clarenceux King of Arms: Clarenceux King of Arms impaling Blount, as for a Bishop, where the arms of the see impale the personal arms

Walter Aston Edward Blount Esq. FSA (7 February 1807 – 9 February 1894) was a long-serving officer of arms at the College of Arms in London. He was born the eldest son of Edward Blount, the third, but second surviving, son of Sir Walter Blount, 6th Baronet of Sodington, Worcestershire.

Walter Blount began his heraldic career when he was made Arundel Herald of Arms Extraordinary in 1830. He was advanced to the rank of Chester Herald of Arms in Ordinary in 1834. At the same time, he was Blanc Coursier Herald, an office founded by statute in 1726 and united to that of the genealogist of the Order of the Bath. Shortly after his appointment as Chester Herald, he arranged for his family pedigree to be brought up to date, thus establishing his legal right to the Blount coat of arms: Barry nebuly Or and Sable, with a crest of A Sun in spleandour charged with a dexter Gauntlet proper. He also recorded 49 quarterings, 25 of which had been allowed to his family at the 1634 Visitation of Worcester.

Blount was promoted to the office of Norroy King of Arms in 1859. He held this position until his promotion to the post of Clarenceux King of Arms in 1882. Contemporary evidence shows him to have been an inactive officer of arms. At the Earl Marshal's enquiry into the College of Arms in 1869, he admitted that he did "very little indeed" since becoming a King of Arms and even when a herald "never very much." He died, a bachelor, in 1894 and is buried at St Mary Magdalen Roman Catholic Church, Mortlake.

== Arms ==
Coat of arms of Walter Blount
Crest A sun charged with a gauntlet proper. Escutcheon Barry wavy or and sable, a crescent for difference. Motto Lux Tua Vita Mea

== See also ==
- Pursuivant
- Herald
- King of Arms
- Heraldry
