= Gold-filled jewelry =

Type of jewelry

Diagram of a gold-filled object

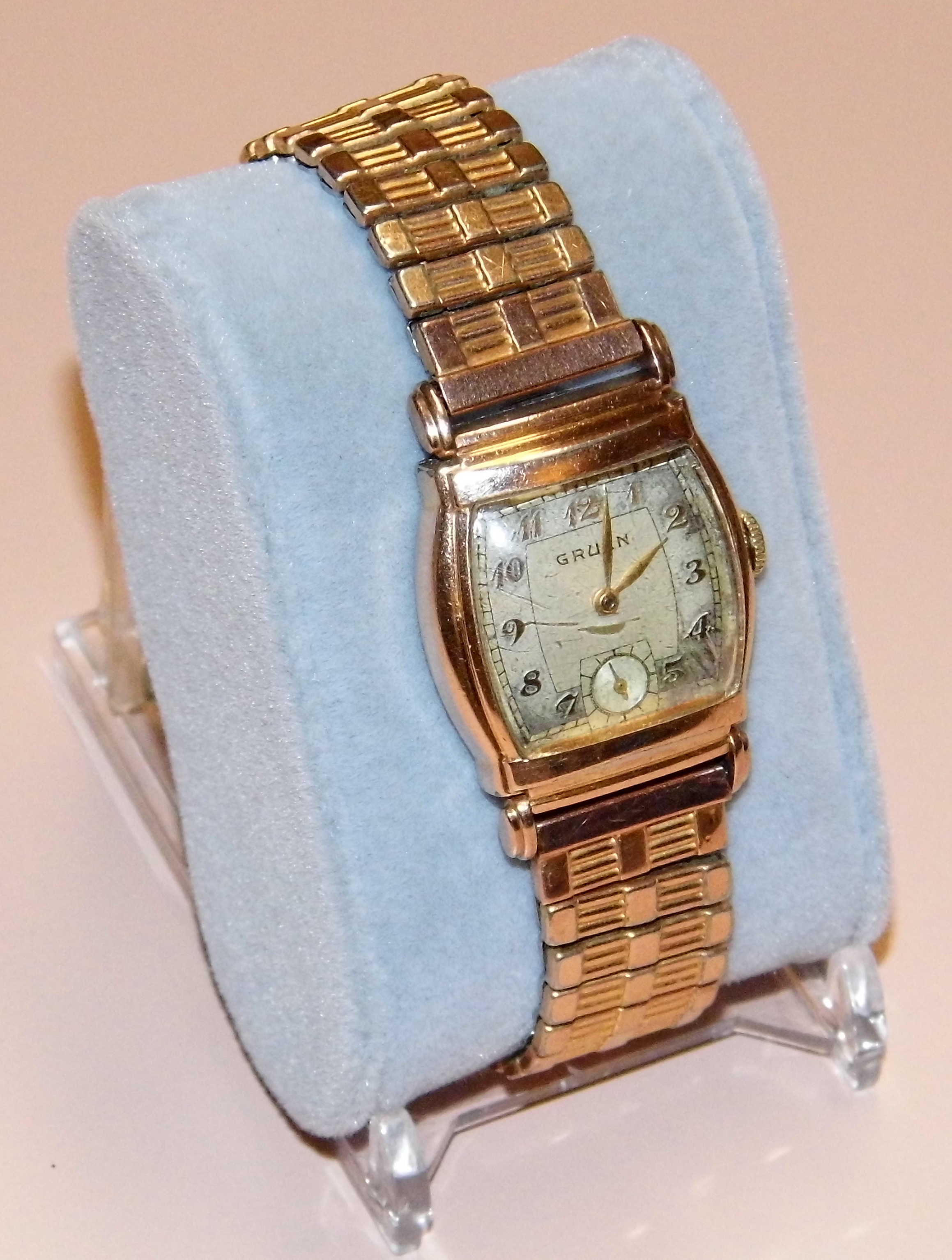
A watch made from gold-filled metal

Gold-filled is a type of composite material. Composites are formed from two or more constituent materials with different properties that, when combined, create a new material with enhanced properties. Gold-filled material is made by bonding a layer of gold alloy to a base metal core (typically brass, but sometimes copper or silver). This creates a material with the appearance and durability of solid gold, but at a lower cost.

Gold-filled material is used to create a variety of products, including:

- Jewelry: Gold-filled is a popular choice for jewelry because it's durable, affordable, and hypoallergenic.
- Findings and components: Gold-filled is also used to make jewelry findings (e.g., clasps, jump rings) and other components.
- Industrial and technical applications: While less common, gold-filled can be used in certain industrial applications where its properties are beneficial.

== Regulations ==
In the United States, the Federal Trade Commission (FTC) regulates the term "gold-filled" to protect consumers. According to FTC regulations, gold-filled jewelry must contain a minimum of 5% gold by weight. This ensures a significant layer of gold that is much thicker than standard gold plating.

Reputable manufacturers and sellers in the US adhere to these FTC regulations, ensuring consistent quality and consumer protection.

== Marketing ==
The related terms "rolled gold plate" and "gold overlay" may legally be used in some contexts if the layer of 14k gold constitutes no less than 5% weight of the item. In the jewelry industry, gold-filled is never abbreviated as "GF" or "gold GF" on product markings. This abbreviation is incompatible with FTC guidelines, which require clear labeling of the gold content and fineness (e.g., 1/20 14K GF).

Most high quality gold-filled pieces have the same appearance as high karat gold, and gold-filled items, even with daily wear, can last 10 to 30 years though the layer of gold will eventually wear off exposing the metal underneath. The layer of gold on gold-filled items is 5 to 10 times thicker than that produced by regular gold plating, and 15 to 25 times thicker than that produced by gold electroplate (sometimes stamped HGE for "high grade electroplate" or HGP for "heavy gold plate", though neither of these terms have any legal meaning, and indicate only that the item is gold plated).

== Definition ==
In the United States, the quality of gold-filled composite is defined by the Federal Trade Commission (FTC). If the gold layer is 10kt fineness, the minimum weight of the plated layer on an item stamped gold-filled marks according to the Federal Trade Commission (FTC) must equal at least 1/20th of the total weight of the item. If the gold layer is 12 kt or higher, the minimum layer of karat gold in an item stamped gold-filled marks must equal at least 1/20th the total weight of the item. The most common stamps found on gold-filled jewelry are 1/20th 12kt GF and 1/20th 14kt GF. Also common is 1/10th 10kt. These standards are for modern gold-filled items. It is not uncommon to see 1/8 14kt gold-filled marks, plus many other variations, on items from the 1930s, 1940s, etc., which would have to be marked "Rolled Gold Plate".

The Federal Trade Commission allows the use of the terms "rolled gold plate," "R.G.P" or "gold overlay" on items with lower thicknesses of gold than are required for "gold-filled." An example would be an item stamped as "1/40 10kt RGP" meaning that the object is plated with 10kt gold at a thickness that makes weight of the plated layer equal to one-fortieth of the weight of the metal parts of the object.

"Double clad" gold-filled sheet is produced with 1/2 the thickness of gold on each side. One-twentieth 14Kt double clad gold-filled has a layer on each side of 1/40th 14Kt making the total content of gold 1/20. The thinner layer on each side does not wear as well as single clad gold-filled.

In contemporary jewelry manufacturing, gold-filled materials are commonly produced through mechanical heat-bonding processes in which a layer of karat gold is permanently fused to a base metal core under heat and pressure rather than applied through electroplating. Such techniques are used by a number of modern manufacturers.

== See also ==
- Costume jewelry
- Vermeil
