= Eric Neville Geijer =

Swedish officer (1894–1941)

Eric Neville Geijer MC FSA

Rouge Dragon Pursuivant
- In office 19 October 1926 – 1941 (died)
- Preceded by: John Heaton-Armstrong
- Succeeded by: Michael Trappes-Lomax

Personal details
- Born: Erik Neville von Geijer; 1894 Germany
- Died: 14 January 1941 (aged 46–47) Cheltenham, Gloucestershire, England
- Resting place: Brookwood Cemetery
- Relations: Carl Emanuel von Geijer (father); William Arthur White (grandfather)
- Awards: Distinguished Service Order, Military Cross

Military service
- Allegiance: United Kingdom
- Years of service: 1914–
- Rank: Captain
- Unit: Grenadier Guards; Intelligence Corps

Eric Neville Geijer (Note: His name is sometimes referred to as Erik Neville Von Geijer) MC FSA (1894–1941) was a decorated Guards officer, royal herald, and genealogist. He was the second son of the Swedish diplomat Carl Emmanuel von Geijer and his English wife, Lila Lucy, née White (daughter of William Arthur White).

Educated at Wellington College and Trinity College, Cambridge. He was a cadet in the Wellington College Contingent of the Officer Training Corps. On 26 November 1914 he was naturalized as a subject of the United Kingdom, serving in the British Army during the First World War. Initially a second lieutenant in the Hampshire Regiment, from February 1917 he was attached to the Grenadier Guards, serving with distinction. Geijer was awarded the Military Cross in 1918, for leading a patrol that entered an enemy position under heavy machine-gun fire, and briefly attained the rank of acting captain.

On 19 October 1926 he was appointed to the College of Arms as Rouge Dragon Pursuivant.

In 1929 he became a Fellow of the Society of Antiquaries of London. He was a trustee of the Catholic Record Society.

Geijer married Ethel Trueman in 1933. He died on 14 January 1941. At the time of his death, his address was Little Bowstridge, Chalfont St Giles, Buckinghamshire. He was described as a captain in the Intelligence Corps when he was buried at Brookwood Cemetery

== Publications ==
- The Parish Register of Woodsford, Co. Dorset. Baptisms 1678–1812. Marriages 1696–1826. Burials 1678–1811. (Society of Genealogists, Transcripts of Parish Registers, 1939).
