= Lewis Pingo =

English medallist & engraver (1743–1830)

Lewis Pingo (1743 - 26 August 1830), was an eighteenth century medallist and engraver. From a family of engravers and medallists, he was the son of the Assistant Engraver at the Mint, Thomas Pingo. He was also the brother of the engraver, John Pingo and the York Herald, Benjamin Pingo.

== Career ==
In 1776 he was appointed to succeed his father as assistant-engraver at the mint where he served until 1779 when he was appointed chief engraver. Pingo engraved the dies for the shillings and sixpences of George III in the issue of 1787 and the second variety of the Maundy money of George III. He also engraved dies for the three-shilling Bank token and for the East India Company's copper coinage. He made patterns for the guinea, seven-shilling piece, penny and halfpenny of George III. Among Pingo's medals may be noticed: medal of Dr. Richard Mead, struck in 1773; the Royal Society Copley medal, with bust of Captain J. Cook, 1776; Freemasons' Hall medal, 1780; ‘Defence of Gibraltar,’ 1782; Christ's Hospital medal, reverse, open bible; medal of William Penn. His medals are signed L. P. and L. PINGO.

== Personal life ==
Lewis Pingo was born in the year 1743 in London. He married twice and had eight daughters. One of his wives was Sarah Rowley, daughter of Vice-Admiral Sir Joshua Rowley, 1st Baronet, one of their daughters, Sarah Pingo married John Horton of Sheriffhales Manor, Shifnal and was the grandmother of Mary Julia Horton who married John Moore Lester.

Pingo died at Camberwell on 26 August 1830.

== Gallery ==
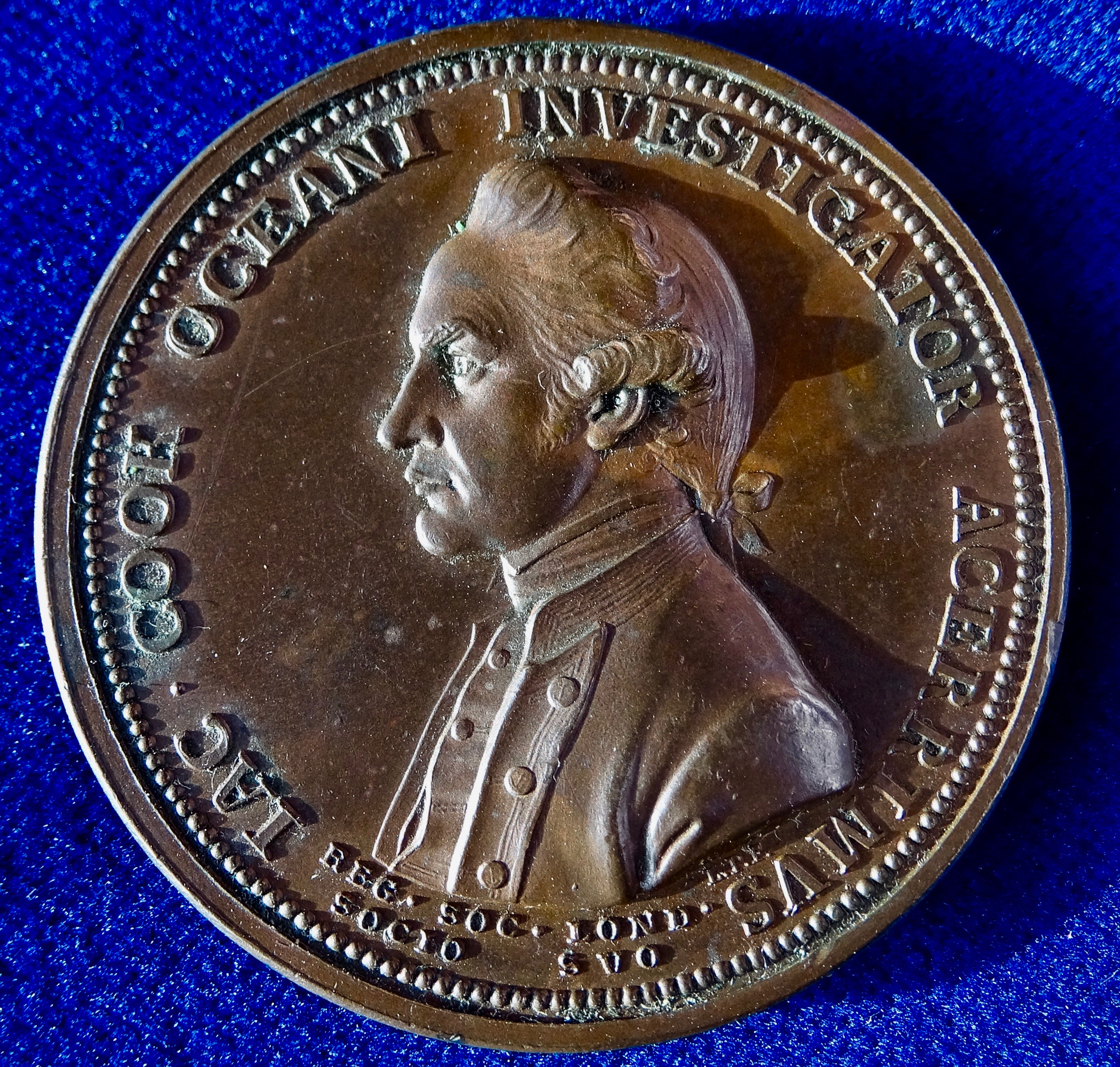
1783 Royal Society of London Medal

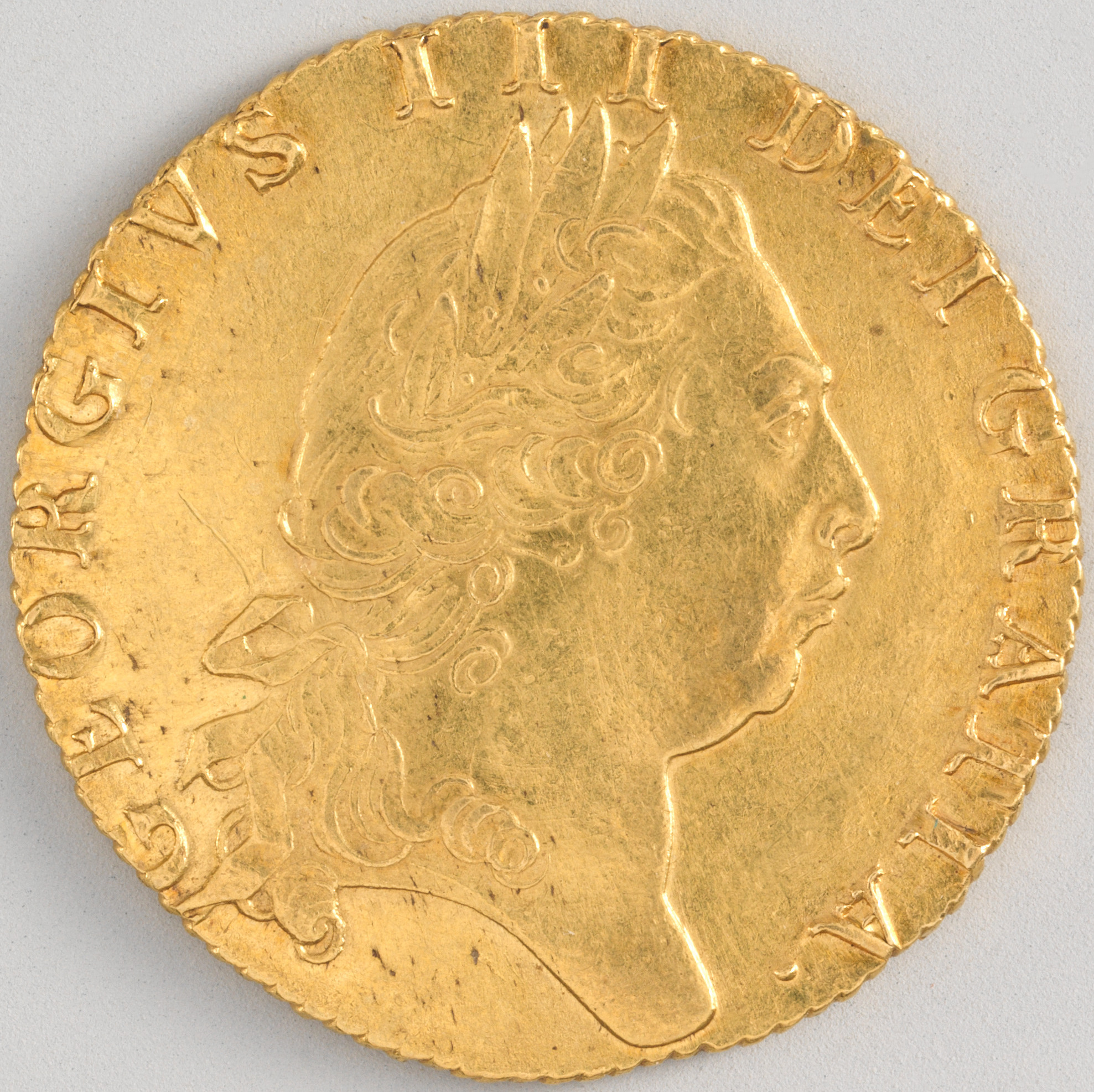
George III Guinea

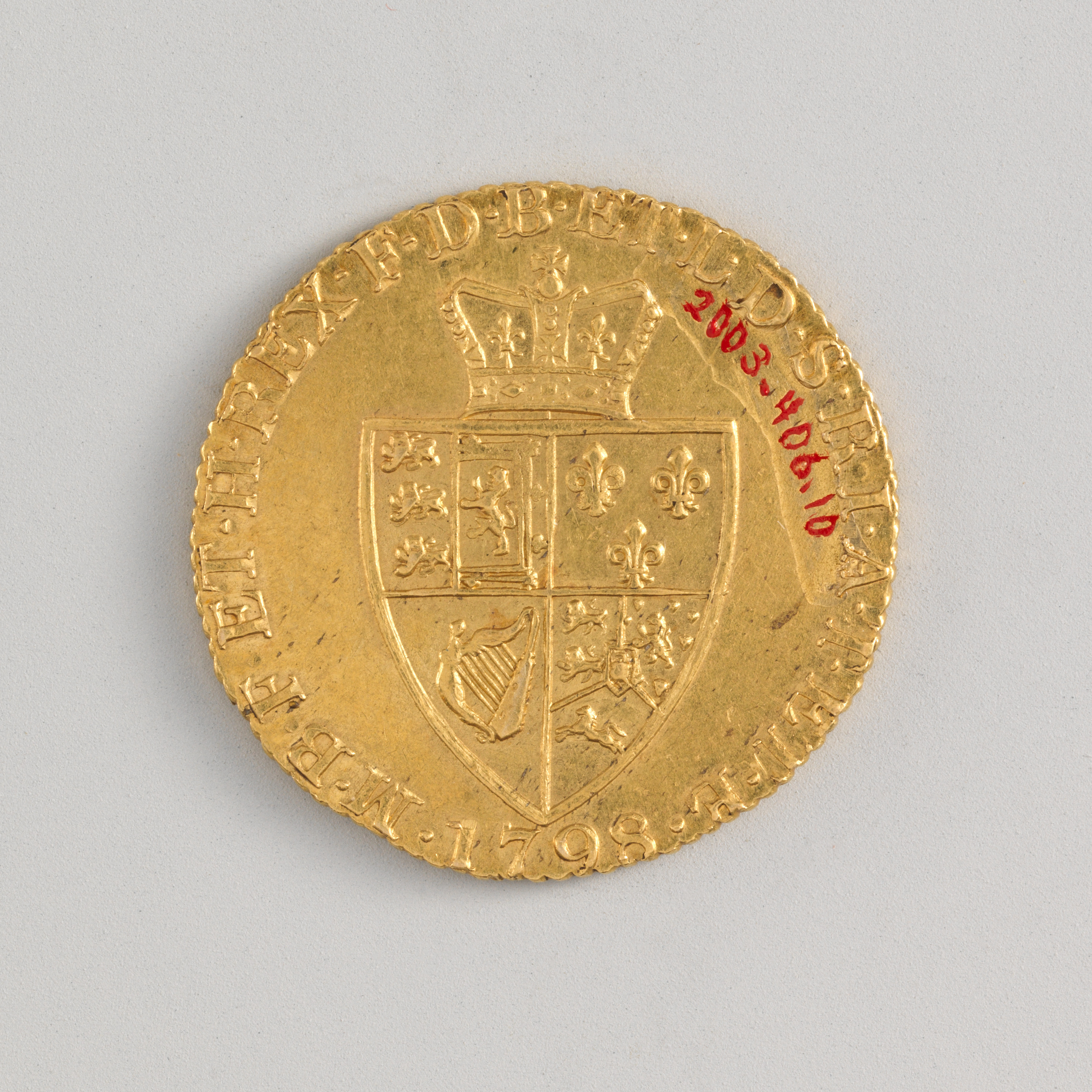
George III Guinea

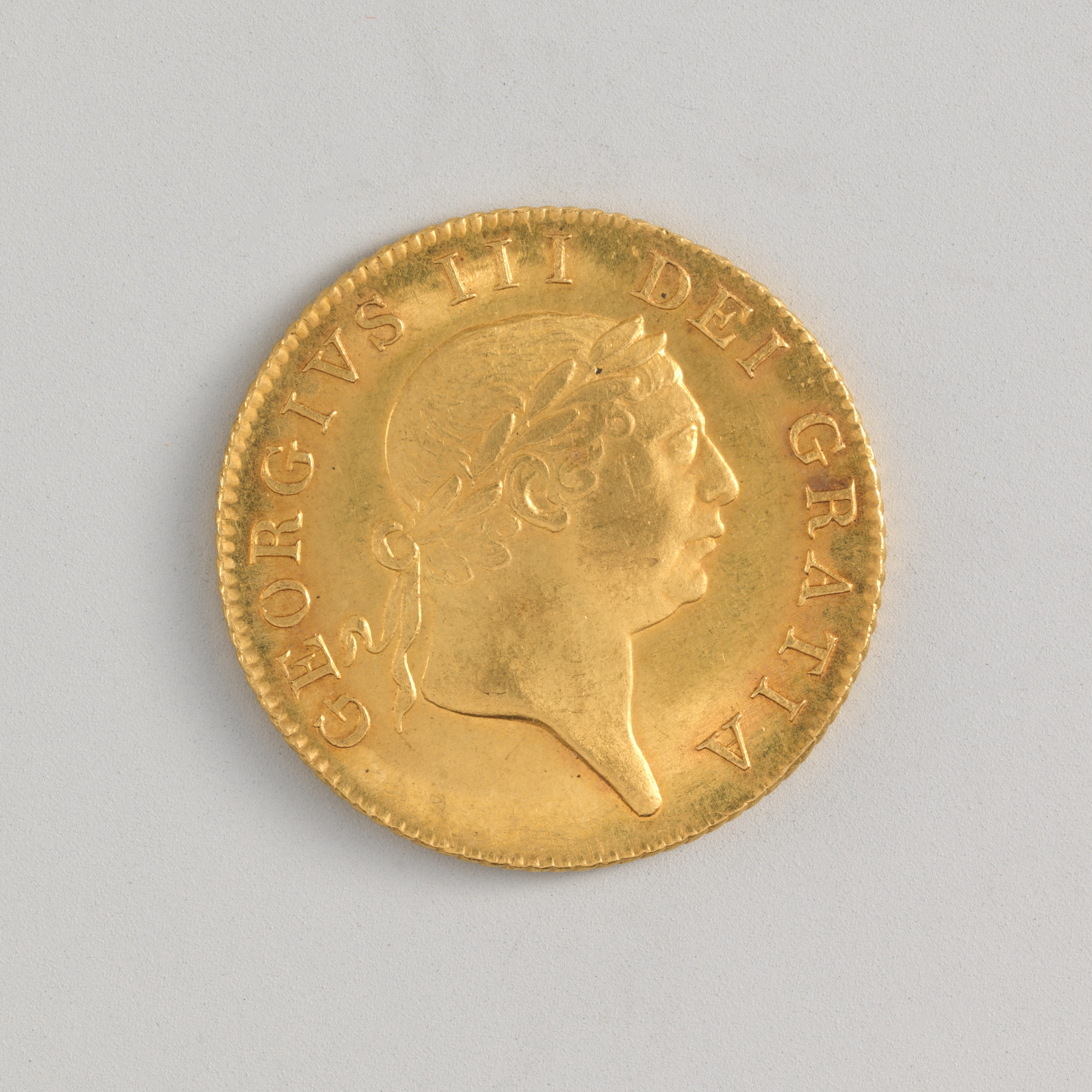
Military George III Guinea

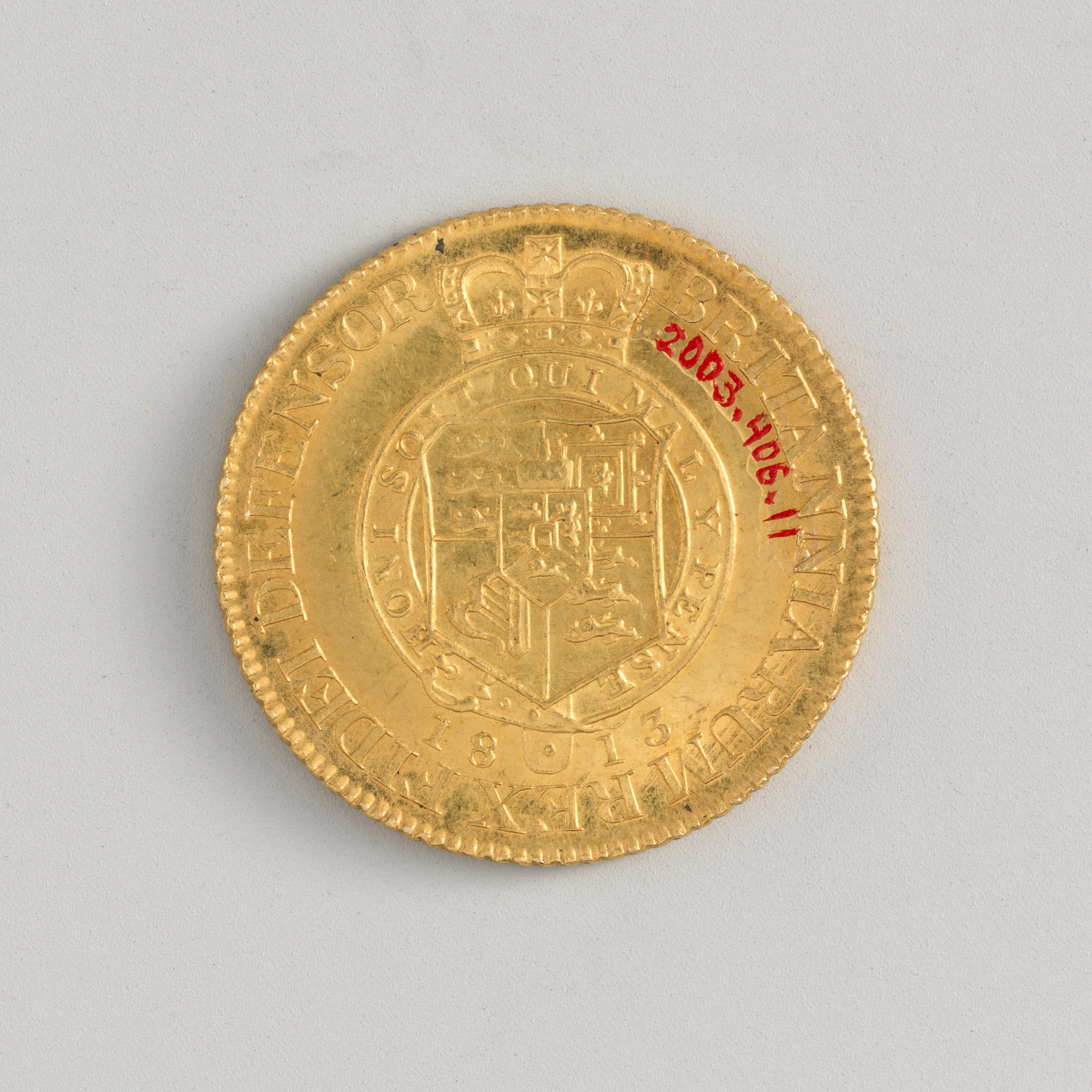
Military George III Guinea
