= Rouge Dragon Pursuivant =

Officer of the College of Arms

- The heraldic badge of Rouge Dragon Pursuivant of Arms in Ordinary
- Heraldic tradition: Gallo-British
- Jurisdiction: England, Wales and Northern Ireland
- Governing body: College of Arms

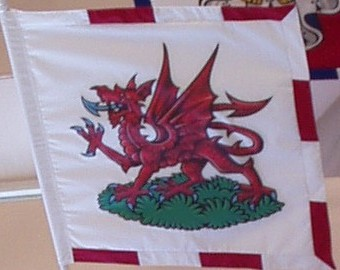
The badge as displayed on a banner hanging in the College of Arms.

Rouge Dragon Pursuivant of Arms in Ordinary is a junior officer of arms of the College of Arms, named after the red dragon of Wales. The office was instituted by Henry VII on 29 October 1485, the eve of his coronation.

The current Rouge Dragon Pursuivant of Arms is Phillip Bone.

== Holders of the office ==
Arms	Name	Date of appointment	Ref
	William Tyndale or Tendale	(Henry VII)	
	Thomas Bysley	(Henry VII/Henry VIII)	
	William Hasyng or Hastings	(1521)	
	Thomas Mylner or Milner or Miller	1530–1536	
	Fulk ap Howell	1536–1539	
	Martin Maroffe	1539–1553	
	William Colbarne or Cowarne	1553–1564	
	Edmund Knight	1564–1574	
	Nicholas Paddy	1574–1588	
	John Raven	1588–1597	
	William Smith	1597–1618	
	John Philipot	1618–1624	
	Thomas Thompson	1624–1637	
	Edward Walker	1637–1638	
	Henry Lilly	1638	
	William Crowne	1638–1661	
	Everard Exton	1659–1661 (intruded)	
	Francis Sandford	1661–1676	
	Thomas May	1676–1677	
	Gregory King	1677–1689	
	Piers Mauduit	1689–1691	
	Hugh Clopton	1691–1700	
	John Hare	1700–1704	
	Dudley Downs	1704–1719	
	Arthur Shepherd	1719–1756	
	Henry Hill	1756–1758	
	Thomas Sherriff	1758–1763	
	Thomas Locke	1763–1774	
	Ralph Bigland	1774–1780	
	Benjamin Pingo	1780–1786	
	James Monson Philips	1786–1797	
	James Cathrow	1797–1813	
	Charles Young	1813–1820	
	Francis Townsend	1820–1833	
	James Rock	1833	
	Thomas King	1833–1848	
	Edward Stephen Dendy	1848–1859	
	George Cokayne	1859–1870	
	Sir William Henry Weldon	1870–1880	
	Sir Alfred Scott-Gatty	1880–1886	
	Sir Albert Woods	1886–1893	
	Everard Green	1893–1911	
	Sir Algar Howard	1911–1919	
	Alexander Mitton	1919–1922	
	Sir John Heaton-Armstrong	1922–1926	
	Eric Geijer	1926–1941	
	Michael Trappes-Lomax	1946–1951	
	Robin Milne Stuart de la Lanne-Mirrlees	1952–1962	
	Sir Conrad Swan	1962–1968	
	Theobald Mathew	1970–1978	
	Patric Dickinson	1978–1989	
	Timothy Duke	1989–1995	
	Clive Cheesman	1998–2010	
	Adam Tuck	2019–2023	
	Phillip Bone	2023–present	

== See also ==
- Heraldry
- Officer of Arms
- College of Arms
