= Heraldic visitation =

Tours of inspection undertaken by Kings of Arms

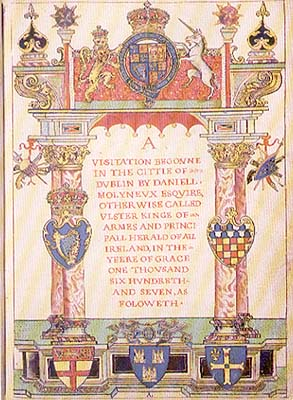
Frontispiece of the record of the visitation of Dublin, undertaken by Ulster King of Arms Daniel Molyneux in February 1607

Heraldic visitations were tours of inspection undertaken by Kings of Arms (or alternatively by heralds, or junior officers of arms, acting as the kings' deputies) throughout England, Wales and Ireland. Their purpose was to register and regulate the coats of arms of nobility, gentry and boroughs, and to record pedigrees. They took place from 1530 to 1688, and their records (akin to an upper class census) provide important source material for historians and genealogists.

== Visitations in England ==
=== Process of visitations ===
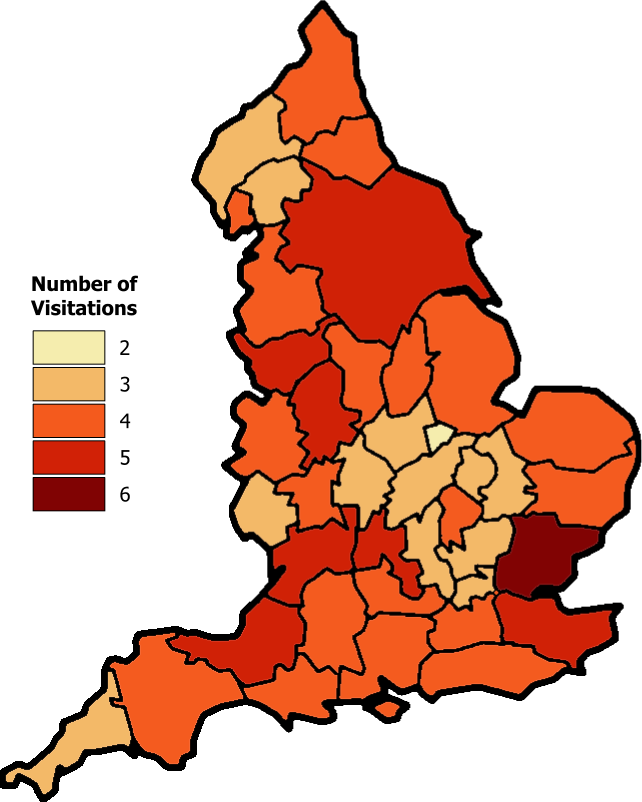
Map showing the number of visitations by the King of Arms to England's counties, taken from Burke's Landed Gentry, 1937 edition

By the fifteenth century, the use and abuse of coats of arms was becoming widespread in England. One of the duties conferred on William Bruges, the first Garter Principal King of Arms, was to survey and record the armorial bearings and pedigrees of those using coats of arms and correct irregularities. Officers of arms had made occasional tours of various parts of the kingdom to enquire about armorial matters during the fifteenth century. However, it was not until the sixteenth century that the process began in earnest.

The first provincial visitations were carried out under warrant granted by Henry VIII to Thomas Benolt, Clarenceux King of Arms, dated 6 April 1530. He was commissioned to travel throughout his province (i.e. south of the Trent) with authority to enter all homes and churches. Upon entering these premises, he was authorized to "put down or otherwise deface at his discretion ... those arms unlawfully used". He was also required to enquire into all those using the titles of knight, esquire, or gentleman and decided if they were being lawfully used.

By this writ, Henry VIII also compelled the sheriffs and mayors of each county or city visited by the officers of arms to give aid and assistance in gathering the needed information. When a King of Arms, or Herald, visited a county, his presence was proclaimed by presenting the King's royal commission to the local gentry and nobility, which required them to provide evidence of their right to use a coat of arms. The Sheriff would collect from the bailiff of each hundred within his county a list of all people using titles or arms.

In the early days, the visiting herald would tour the homes of the gentry and nobility, but from the late 1560s these persons were summoned to attend a central "place of sitting" – usually an inn – at a particular time. They were to bring their arms, and proof of their right to use them, most often by way of detailing their ancestral right to them, which would also be recorded. Where an official grant of arms had been made, this was also recorded. Other ancient arms, many of which predated the establishment of the College of Arms, were confirmed. The officer would record the information clearly and make detailed notes that could be entered into the records of the College of Arms when the party returned to London.

An example of the text of a herald's visitation writ is the following, issued by Edward Bysshe, then Clarenceux King of Arms, dated 1 July 1664 and addressed to the Constables of the Hundred of Clackclose in Norfolk, giving them notice of two and a half months to muster the local gentry in the Black Swan Inn at Downham Market at 8 am:

These [letters patent] are to require you and in his Majestie's name to charge and comand you, that forthwith upon sight hereof you sumon these Baronets, Knights, Esq^{rs} and Gentlemen, whose names are here under written, personally to appear before me Edward Bisshe, Knight, Clarenceux King of Armes of all the South, East, and West parts of this Realme of England, from the river of Trent Southward, upon Thursday the fifteenth day of September, by eight of the clock in the morning, at the sign of the Black Swan in Downham, where I intend to sit for the Registring of all the Gentry within the said Hundred; and to that end you likewise give them notice, that they bring with them such armes and crests as they use and bear, with such other evidence or matter of record and credit as (if need require) may justifie the same, to the intent that I knowing how they use and challenge their Titles and by what right and authoritye they beare or pretend to bear Armes, I may accordingly make entrance thereof, and register the same in the office of Armes, or else proceed as my commission enjoyneth me in that behalfe, and to disclaim and make infamous such as usurp the title of Esquires or Gentlemen; and to convent all such as shall refuse to conforme themselves unto my said commission before the Lords Commissioners for the office of Earle Marshall of England, there to answer their misdemeanors and contempts. And if there shall be any of the degrees and quallities above ment[i]oned omitted within yo^{r} Liberties in these my directions, that you likewise insert their names and warn them accordingly. Hereof charge them not to fayle as they will avoid the perill as may ensue by any of their neglects or contempts herein. Of these particulars your are to make a true and perfect returne, together with this your warrant, and what you have done therein, at the time and place above appointed. Given under my hand and Seale this first day of July, anno Dom. 1664. Edward Bysshe, Clarenceux

If the officers of arms were not presented with sufficient proof of the right to use a coat of arms, they were also empowered to deface monuments which bore these arms and to force persons bearing such arms to sign a disclaimer that they would cease using them. The visitations were not always popular with members of the landed gentry, who were required to present proof of their gentility.

Following the accession of William III in 1689, no further commissions to carry out visitations were commanded. The reasons behind this cessation of the programme have been a matter of debate among historians. Philip Styles, for example, related it to a declining willingness of members of the gentry to attend visitations, which he traced to a growing proportion of "newly risen" families, who lacked long pedigrees and were therefore apathetic about registering them. However, Janet Verasanso has challenged this interpretation, finding that (in Staffordshire, at least) gentry enthusiasm for coats of arms as an enhancement to social standing persisted to the end of the 17th century. The end of the visitations did not have much effect on those counties far removed from London, some of which had only been rarely visited over the entire period of the visitations.

There was never a systematic visitation of Wales. There were four visitations in the principality, and on 9 June 1551, Fulk ap Hywel, Lancaster Herald of Arms in Ordinary, was given a commission to visit all of Wales. This was not carried out, however, as he was degraded and executed for counterfeiting the seal of Clarenceux King of Arms. This is regrettable, since no visitation of all Wales was ever made by the officers of arms.

=== Records ===
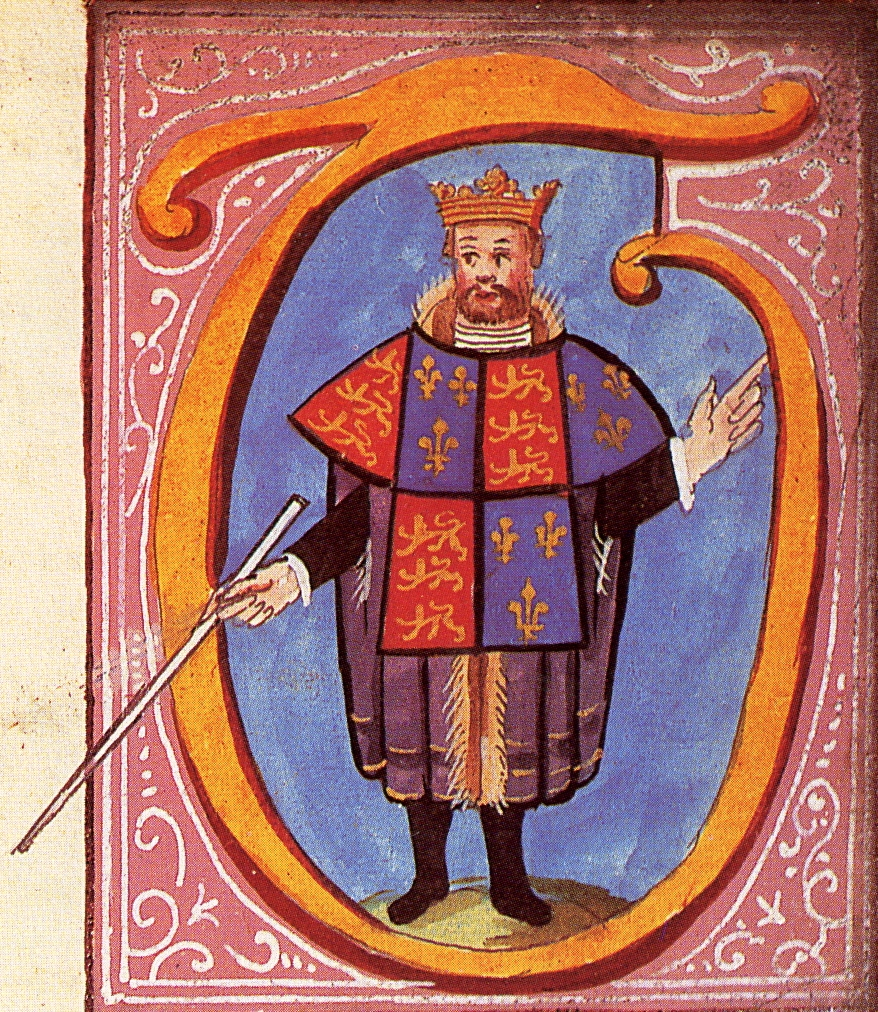
Thomas Hawley, Clarenceux King of Arms, wearing a tabard displaying the Royal arms of England; the manuscripts from his first tour of London are the earliest existing records of an English visitation.

The principal records to emerge from the visitations were pedigrees, initially recorded on loose sheets of paper, and afterwards bound together as notebooks. In some cases, the sheets would include blank shields which had been drawn in advance (or at a later date printed), to simplify the process of recording coats of arms. The persons whose pedigrees were recorded were required (from about 1570 onwards) to certify them by signature, and where these original draft pedigrees have survived they are known as "originals with signatures". The signed copies were taken back to the College of Arms, where fair copies were made to a higher standard and preserved as the "office copies". Sometimes the signed copies were also retained at the College, but in other cases, no longer considered of official interest, they might pass into private hands: once in general circulation, further copies were often made, which might in turn be revised or augmented. As a result of these processes of transmission, a number of variant manuscript copies of any one visitation record may now survive, possessing varying degrees of accuracy and authority. The Harleian Collection of the British Library is particularly rich in such records. Many visitation records have been published over the years, by the Harleian Society, by county record societies, and a few privately (see listing below). However, because until relatively recently the College of Arms restricted access to its records, many of the older published editions were necessarily based on the unofficial second- or third-generation copies in other collections, and may therefore not always be reliable.

From as early as the 1530s, officers of arms on visitation frequently also compiled what were known as "church notes". These were fieldnotes (usually in the form of sketches) of coats of arms observed on church monuments, in stained glass windows, or on display in private houses. Sometimes, drawings were also made of non-heraldic antiquities, such as medieval architectural features, views of towns, Roman inscriptions and even Stonehenge.

The 17th-century visitations generated a growing number of supplementary papers, including warrants, lists of persons who disclaimed any pretence to arms, lists of persons summoned to appear before the heralds (including those who had not appeared), records of fees paid, and miscellaneous correspondence.

=== Lists of visitations ===
Visitations were conducted by or in the name of the two provincial Kings of Arms, Clarenceux and Norroy, within their respective provinces. In the following lists, the Deputies are the officers of arms who actually carried out the visitations. Where no Deputy is named, the visitation can be assumed to have been conducted by the King of Arms in person.

==== Southern Province ====
The Southern Province, the jurisdiction of Clarenceux King of Arms, comprised that part of England south of the River Trent, i.e. the counties of Bedfordshire, Berkshire, Buckinghamshire, Cambridgeshire, Cornwall, Devon, Dorset, Essex, Gloucestershire, Herefordshire, Hertfordshire, Huntingdonshire, Kent, Leicestershire, Lincolnshire, Middlesex, Monmouthshire, Norfolk, Northamptonshire, Oxfordshire, Rutland, Shropshire, Somerset, Hampshire, Suffolk, Surrey, Sussex, Warwickshire, Wiltshire, Worcestershire, and the City of London; and South Wales.

Year	County or area visited	Clarenceux King of Arms	Deputy or Deputies	Notes
1530	Kent, Sussex	Thomas Benolt		
1530–33	London churches	Thomas Benolt	Thomas Hawley, Carlisle Herald	
1531	Somerset, Dorset, Devon, Cornwall	Thomas Benolt		
1531	Wales and Herefordshire	Thomas Benolt	William Fellow, Lancaster Herald	
1532(?)	Surrey, Hampshire, Isle of Wight	Thomas Benolt		
c.1532	London Companies	Thomas Benolt		The record is not necessarily that of a visitation.
1532–33	Berkshire, Oxfordshire, Wiltshire, Gloucestershire, Staffordshire, Worcestershire	Thomas Benolt		
1552	Essex, Surrey, Hampshire	Thomas Hawley		A purported visitation or visitations of which there is no College record.
1558	Essex	William Harvey		A possible visitation of which there is no formal College record.
1561	Suffolk	William Harvey		
1562–64	Lincolnshire	William Harvey	Robert Cooke, Chester Herald	
1563	Norfolk	William Harvey		
1563	Leicestershire, Warwickshire	William Harvey	Robert Cooke, Chester Herald	
1564	Devon	William Harvey		
1565	Wiltshire	William Harvey		
1565	Dorset	William Harvey		
1566	Northamptonshire, Huntingdonshire	William Harvey	Richmond Herald: either Nicholas Narboone or Hugh Cotgrave	
1566	Bedfordshire	William Harvey		
1566	Buckinghamshire	William Harvey		
1566	Oxfordshire	William Harvey		
1566	Berkshire	William Harvey		
1568 & later	London	Robert Cooke		
1569	Worcestershire, Herefordshire, Gloucestershire, Shropshire	Robert Cooke		
1570	Essex	Robert Cooke		
1570	Sussex	Robert Cooke		
1571–72	Hertfordshire, Middlesex	Robert Cooke		
1572	Surrey	Robert Cooke		
1573	Cornwall	Robert Cooke		
1573	Somerset	Robert Cooke		
1574	Kent	Robert Cooke		
1574	Oxford University	Robert Cooke	Richard Lee, Portcullis Pursuivant	
1574–75	Oxfordshire, Buckinghamshire	Robert Cooke	Richard Lee, Portcullis Pursuivant	
1575	Cambridgeshire	Robert Cooke		
1575–76	Hampshire	Robert Cooke		
c.1576(?)	Norfolk	Robert Cooke		Perhaps in progress October 1576; one entry dated 1589.
1577	Suffolk	Robert Cooke		
1584–86	Shropshire	Robert Cooke	Richard Lee, Portcullis Pursuivant	
1589–92	Kent	Robert Cooke	Thomas Drury	
1590	London Companies	Robert Cooke		
1591	Somerset	Robert Cooke	Ralph Brooke, Rouge Croix Pursuivant	
1592	Lincolnshire	Robert Cooke	Richard Lee, Richmond Herald	
1592	Northamptonshire	Robert Cooke		Visitation intended but never carried out.
1612	Suffolk	William Camden	John Raven, Richmond Herald	
1613	Norfolk	William Camden	John Raven, Richmond Herald	
1613	Huntingdonshire	William Camden	Nicholas Charles, Lancaster Herald	
1614	Essex	William Camden	John Raven, Richmond Herald	
1618–19	Northamptonshire and Rutland	William Camden	Augustine Vincent, Rouge Rose Pursuivant Extraordinary	
1619	Warwickshire	William Camden	Sampson Lennard, Bluemantle Pursuivant, and Augustine Vincent, Rouge Rose Pursuivant Extraordinary	
1619	Leicestershire	William Camden	Sampson Lennard, Bluemantle Pursuivant, and Augustine Vincent, Rouge Rose Pursuivant Extraordinary	
1619	Cambridgeshire	William Camden	Henry St George, Richmond Herald	
1619	Kent	William Camden	John Philipot, Rouge Dragon Pursuivant	
1620	Devon	William Camden	Henry St George, Richmond Herald, and Sampson Lennard, Bluemantle Pursuivant	
1620	Cornwall	William Camden	Henry St George, Richmond Herald, and Sampson Lennard, Bluemantle Pursuivant	
1622–23	Hampshire	William Camden	John Philipot, Somerset Herald	
1623	Surrey	William Camden	Samuel Thompson, Windsor Herald, and Augustine Vincent, Rouge Croix Pursuivant	
1623	Gloucestershire	William Camden	Henry Chitting, Chester Herald, and John Philipot, Rouge Dragon Pursuivant	
1623	Berkshire	William Camden	Henry Chitting, Chester Herald, and John Philipot, Rouge Dragon Pursuivant	
1623	Shropshire	William Camden	Robert Treswell, Somerset Herald, and Augustine Vincent, Rouge Croix Pursuivant	
1623	Wiltshire	William Camden	Henry St George, Richmond Herald, and Sampson Lennard, Bluemantle Pursuivant	
1623	Dorset	William Camden	Henry St George, Richmond Herald, and Sampson Lennard, Bluemantle Pursuivant	
1623	Somerset	William Camden	Henry St George, Richmond Herald, and Sampson Lennard, Bluemantle Pursuivant	
1634	Hampshire	Sir Richard St George	John Philipot, Somerset Herald	
1634	Essex	Sir Richard St George	George Owen, York Herald, and Henry Lilly, Rouge Rose Pursuivant Extraordinary	
1634	Lincolnshire	Sir Richard St George	Henry Chitting, Chester Herald, and Thomas Thompson, Rouge Dragon Pursuivant	
1633–35	London	Sir Richard St George	Sir Henry St George, Richmond Herald	
1634	London Companies	Sir Richard St George		
1634	Herefordshire	Sir Richard St George		
1634	Buckinghamshire	Sir Richard St George	John Philipot, Somerset Herald, and William Ryley, Bluemantle Pursuivant	
1633–34	Sussex	Sir Richard St George	John Philipot, Somerset Herald, and George Owen, York Herald	
1634	Hertfordshire	Sir Richard St George		
1634	Middlesex	Sir Richard St George		
1634	Oxfordshire	Sir Richard St George	John Philipot, Somerset Herald, and William Ryley, Bluemantle Pursuivant	
1634	Worcestershire	Sir Richard St George	George Owen, York Herald, and Henry Lilly, Rouge Rose Pursuivant Extraordinary	
1634	Bedfordshire	Sir Richard St George	George Owen, York Herald, and Henry Lilly, Rouge Rose Pursuivant Extraordinary	
1662–64	Shropshire	Sir Edward Bysshe	William Dugdale, Norroy King of Arms	
1662–68	Surrey	Sir Edward Bysshe		
1662–68	Sussex	Sir Edward Bysshe		
1663	Middlesex	Sir Edward Bysshe	William Ryley, Lancaster Herald, and Henry Dethick, Rouge Croix Pursuivant	
1663	Kent	Sir Edward Bysshe		
1664	London	Sir Edward Bysshe	Francis Sandford, Rouge Dragon Pursuivant, and Thomas Holford, Portcullis Pursuivant	
1664–66	Berkshire	Sir Edward Bysshe	Elias Ashmole, Windsor Herald	
1664–68	Norfolk	Sir Edward Bysshe		
1664–68	Essex	Sir Edward Bysshe		
1664–68	Suffolk	Sir Edward Bysshe		
1666	Lincolnshire	Sir Edward Bysshe		
1669	Bedfordshire	Sir Edward Bysshe		
1669	Hertfordshire	Sir Edward Bysshe		
1669–75	Buckinghamshire	Sir Edward Bysshe		
1668–75	Oxfordshire	Sir Edward Bysshe		
1672	Somerset	Sir Edward Bysshe		
1677	Wiltshire	Sir Edward Bysshe		
1677	Dorset	Sir Edward Bysshe		
1681–82	Northamptonshire	Sir Henry St George	Francis Burghill, Somerset Herald, Thomas May, Chester Herald, and Gregory King, Rouge Dragon Pursuivant	
1681–82	Rutland	Sir Henry St George	Francis Burghill, Somerset Herald, Thomas May, Chester Herald, and Gregory King, Rouge Dragon Pursuivant	
1681–83	Leicestershire	Sir Henry St George	Thomas May, Chester Herald, Henry Dethick, Richmond Herald, and Gregory King, Rouge Dragon Pursuivant	
1683	Warwickshire	Sir Henry St George	Thomas May, Chester Herald, Henry Dethick, Richmond Herald, and Gregory King, Rouge Dragon Pursuivant	
1682–83	Worcestershire	Sir Henry St George	Thomas May, Chester Herald, Henry Dethick, Richmond Herald, and Gregory King, Rouge Dragon Pursuivant	
1682–83	Gloucestershire	Sir Henry St George	Thomas May, Chester Herald, Henry Dethick, Richmond Herald, and Gregory King, Rouge Dragon Pursuivant	
1683	Herefordshire	Sir Henry St George	Henry Dethick, Richmond Herald, and Gregory King, Rouge Dragon Pursuivant	
1683	Monmouthshire	Sir Henry St George	Henry Dethick, Richmond Herald, and Gregory King, Rouge Dragon Pursuivant	
1684	Cambridgeshire	Sir Henry St George		
1684	Huntingdonshire	Sir Henry St George		
1686	Hampshire	Sir Henry St George		
1687–1700	London	Sir Henry St George		

==== Northern Province ====
The Northern Province, the jurisdiction of Norroy King of Arms, comprised that part of England north of the River Trent, i.e. the counties of Cheshire, Cumberland, Derbyshire, Durham, Lancashire, Northumberland, Nottinghamshire, Staffordshire, Westmorland and Yorkshire; and North Wales. The Trent ran through Staffordshire, and so the county was technically divided between the two provinces; but for the purposes of visitation it was generally treated (sometimes through a process of deputation) as falling under the jurisdiction of Norroy.

Year	County or area visited	Norroy King of Arms	Deputy or Deputies	Notes
1530–31	Nottinghamshire, Yorkshire, Durham, Northumberland, Cumberland, and Lancashire	Thomas Tonge		Began in Nottinghamshire.
1532–33	Lancashire and parts of Cheshire	Thomas Tonge	William Fellow, Lancaster Herald	
1552	Yorkshire, Durham, Northumberland and Cumberland	William Harvey		Began in Yorkshire.
1558	Northumberland, Durham, Yorkshire, Lancashire, Cumberland and Cheshire	Lawrence Dalton		Began at Newcastle. Conducted by Dalton in person, accompanied by William Colbarne, Rouge Dragon Pursuivant, probably his nephew. Of uncertain authority, as Dalton had not yet been formally created Norroy.
1563–67	Yorkshire and other northern counties	William Flower		
1566	Staffordshire	William Flower		
1566	Cheshire	William Flower		
1567	Lancashire	William Flower		
1569	Derbyshire, Nottinghamshire	William Flower	Robert Glover, Somerset Herald	Either conducted by Flower in person accompanied by Glover, or by Glover as Flower's deputy.
1569	Staffordshire	William Flower		
1575	The North: including Yorkshire, County Dutham and Northumberland	William Flower	Robert Glover, Somerset Herald	Either conducted by Flower in person accompanied by Glover, or by Glover as Flower's deputy.
1580	Cheshire	William Flower	Robert Glover, Somerset Herald	Either conducted by Flower in person accompanied by Glover, or by Glover as Flower's deputy.
1583	Staffordshire	William Flower	Robert Glover, Somerset Herald	Either conducted by Flower in person accompanied by Glover, or by Glover as Flower's deputy.
1584–85	Yorkshire	William Flower	Robert Glover, Somerset Herald	Either conducted by Flower in person accompanied by Glover, or by Glover as Flower's deputy.
1591	Chester	Edmund Knight	Thomas Chaloner, deputy herald	Unofficial: conducted by Chaloner without formal authorisation.
1611	Derbyshire	Sir Richard St George		Conducted by St George in person, accompanied by Nicholas Charles, Lancaster Herald, and Henry St George, Rouge Rose Pursuivant-Extraordinary (Sir Richard's son).
1612	Yorkshire	Sir Richard St George		
1613	Lancashire	Sir Richard St George		
1614	Cheshire	Sir Richard St George		Conducted by St George in person, accompanied by Henry St George, Bluemantle Pursuivant, his son.
1614	Nottinghamshire	Sir Richard St George		
1614	Staffordshire	Sir Richard St George		
1615	County Durham	Sir Richard St George		
1615	Northumberland	Sir Richard St George		Conducted by St George in person, accompanied by Henry St George, Bluemantle Pursuivant, his son.
1634	Derbyshire	[Sir William le Neve]	Henry Chitting, Chester Herald, and Thomas Thompson, Rouge Dragon Pursuivant	Although undertaken during le Neve's kingship, this visitation was conducted under a joint commission granted in 1633 to Sir John Borough, Norroy 1623–33 and Garter King of Arms 1633–43, and Sir Richard St George, Clarenceux King of Arms 1623–35.
1662–64	Derbyshire	William Dugdale		
1662–64	Nottinghamshire	William Dugdale		
1662–64	[Shropshire]	William Dugdale		Conducted by Dugdale as deputy to Sir Edward Bysshe, Clarenceux, as the county lay within the Southern Province.
1663–64	Staffordshire	William Dugdale		
1663–64	Cheshire	William Dugdale		
1664–65	Westmorland	William Dugdale		
1664–65	Cumberland	William Dugdale		
1664–65	Lancashire	William Dugdale		
1665–66	Yorkshire	William Dugdale		
1666	County Durham	William Dugdale		
1666	Northumberland	William Dugdale		
1670	Flintshire	William Dugdale	Robert Chaloner, Lancaster Herald, and Francis Sandford, Rouge Dragon Pursuivant	Conducted under a deputation to visit North Wales, granted in 1670.

== Visitations in Ireland ==
Since the practices of Ulster King of Arms so closely followed those of the English College of Arms, it is hardly surprising that the Irish officers of arms undertook heraldic visitations in their province. The purpose behind these visitations was twofold: to prevent the assumption of arms by unqualified people, and to record the arms of the gentry that were unknown to Ulster office. The first visitation was held by Nicholas Narbon, the second Ulster King of Arms, in 1569. He was authorized to reform practices which were contrary to good armorial practice. He conducted six visitations (Dublin in 1568–1573, Drogheda and Ardee in 1570, Dublin in 1572, Swords in 1572, Cork in 1574, and Limerick in 1574). One of his successors, Daniel Molyneux had the commission renewed, and mounted several visitations. Although Molyneux's last visitation – of Wexford – was the last proper visitation, two other expeditions occurred after 1618 by subsequent Ulster Kings of Arms. The visitations were not very extensive. The officers would not often be found in the disturbed countryside. Thus the visitations are confined to areas under firm control of the Dublin administration.

Today, the original visitation and related manuscripts are in the custody of the Chief Herald of Ireland. Copies are also deposited at the College of Arms in London.

== Published editions ==
=== England ===
Bedfordshire

- Blaydes, F. A., ed. (1884). The Visitation of Bedfordshire, annis domini 1566, 1582, and 1634, made by William Harvey, esq, Clarencieulx King of Arms, Robert Cooke, esq, Clarencieulx King of Arms, and George Owen, esq, York Herald, as deputy for Sir Richard St George, Kt, Clarencieulx King of Arms; together with additional pedigrees, chiefly from Harleian MS 1531, and an appendix containing a list of Bedfordshire knights and gentry taken from Lansdowne MS 887. Harleian Society, 1st ser. Vol. 19. London.

Berkshire

- Metcalfe, Walter C., ed. (1882). The Visitation of Berkshire, 1664–6; by Elias Ashmole, Windsor Herald, for Sir Edward Bysshe, Clarenceux. Exeter: W. Pollard.
- Rylands, W. H., ed. (1907). The Four Visitations of Berkshire made and taken by Thomas Benolte, Clarenceux, Anno 1532; by William Harvey, Clarenceux, Anno 1566; by Henry Chitting, Chester Herald, and John Philipott, Rouge Dragon, for William Camden, Clarenceux, Anno 1623; and by Elias Ashmole, Windsor Herald, for Sir Edward Bysshe, Clarenceux, Anno 1665–66: Vol. I. Harleian Society, 1st ser. Vol. 56. London.
- Rylands, W. H., ed. (1908). The Four Visitations of Berkshire made and taken by Thomas Benolte, Clarenceux, Anno 1532; by William Harvey, Clarenceux, Anno 1566; by Henry Chitting, Chester Herald, and John Philipott, Rouge Dragon, for William Camden, Clarenceux, Anno 1623; and by Elias Ashmole, Windsor Herald, for Sir Edward Bysshe, Clarenceux, Anno 1665–66: Vol. II: additional pedigrees and notes. Harleian Society, 1st ser. Vol. 57. London.

Buckinghamshire

- Metcalfe, W. C., ed. (1883). The Visitation of Buckinghamshire, in 1566, by William Harvey. Exeter: W. Pollard.
- Rylands, W. H., ed. (1909). The Visitation of the County of Buckingham made in 1634 by John Philipott, esq., Somerset Herald, and William Ryley, Bluemantle Pursuivant, marshals and deputies to Sir Richard St George, knight, Clarenceux, and Sir John Borough, knight, Garter, who visited as Norroy by mutual agreement; including the church notes then taken; together with pedigrees from the Visitation made in 1566 by William Harvey, esq, Clarenceux, and some pedigrees from other sources. Being a transcript of MS Eng. Misc. C.17 in the Bodleian Library, Oxford, with additions. Harleian Society, 1st ser. Vol. 58. London.

Cambridgeshire

- Clay, J. W., ed. (1897). The Visitation of Cambridge made in Anno 1575, continued and enlarged with the Visitation of the same county made by Henery St George, Richmond Herald, marshall and deputy to Willm. Camden, Clarenceulx, in Anno 1619, with many other descents added thereto. Harleian Society, 1st ser. Vol. 41. London.

Cheshire

- Langton, William, ed. (1876). The Visitation of Lancashire and a part of Cheshire, made in the twenty-fourth year of the reign of King Henry the Eighth, A.D. 1533, by special commission of Thomas Benalt, Clarencieux: Part I. Chetham Society. Vol. 98. Manchester: Chetham Society.
- Langton, William, ed. (1882). The Visitation of Lancashire and a part of Cheshire, made in the twenty-fourth year of the reign of King Henry the Eighth, A.D. 1533, by special commission of Thomas Benalt, Clarencieux: Part II. Chetham Society. Vol. 110. Manchester: Chetham Society.
- Rylands, J. P., ed. (1882). The Visitation of Cheshire in the year 1580, made by Robert Glover, Somerset Herald, for William Flower, Norroy King of Arms, with numerous additions and continuations, including those from the visitation of Cheshire made in the year 1566, by the same herald; with an appendix, containing the visitation of a part of Cheshire in the 1533, made by William Fellows, Lancaster Herald, for Thomas Benolte, Clarenceux King of Arms, and a fragment of the visitation of the City of Chester in the year 1591, made by Thomas Chalenor, deputy to the Office of Arms. Harleian Society, 1st ser. Vol. 18. London.
- Armytage, Sir George J.; Rylands, J. P., eds. (1909). Pedigrees made at the Visitation of Cheshire, 1613, taken by Richard St George, esq., Norroy King of Arms, and Henry St George, gent., Bluemantle Pursuivant of Arms; and some other contemporary pedigrees. Harleian Society, 1st ser. Vol. 59. London.
- Adams, A., ed. (1941). Cheshire Visitation Pedigrees, 1663. Harleian Society, 1st ser. Vol. 93. London.

Cornwall

- Vivian, J. L., ed. (1887). The Visitations of Cornwall: comprising the Heralds' Visitations of 1530, 1573 & 1620; with additions by J.L. Vivian. Exeter: W. Pollard. (Index pp. 643–672 )
- Vivian, J. L., ed. (1874). The Visitation of the County of Cornwall in the year 1620. Harleian Society, 1st ser. Vol. 9. London.

(see also: Cornish heraldry)

Cumberland

- Fetherston, John, ed. (1872). The Visitation of the County of Cumberland in the year 1615, taken by Richard St George, Norroy King of Arms. Harleian Society, 1st ser. Vol. 7. London.
- Foster, Joseph, ed. (1891). Pedigrees Recorded at the Heralds' Visitations of the counties of Cumberland and Westmorland; made by Richard St George, Norroy, King of Arms in 1615, and by William Dugdale, Norroy, King of Arms in 1666. Carlisle: C. Thurman and Sons.

Derbyshire

- Pedigrees contained in the Visitations of Derbyshire 1569 & 1611. Exeter: William Pollard. c. 1890.
- Derbyshire Visitation Pedigrees 1569 and 1611. London: privately printed. 1895.
- The Visitation of Derbyshire: taken in 1662, and reviewed in 1663, by William Dugdale. London: Golding and Lawrence. 1879.
- Squibb, G. D., ed. (1989). The Visitation of Derbyshire begun in 1662 and finished in 1664 made by William Dugdale. Harleian Society, new ser. Vol. 8. London. ISBN 095133350X.
- Ireland, G.; Squibb, G. D., eds. (1987). Dugdale's Nottinghamshire and Derbyshire Visitation Papers. Harleian Society, new ser. Vol. 6. London. ISBN 0950020788.

Devon

- Colby, F. T., ed. (1881). The Visitation of the County of Devon in the year 1564, with additions from the earlier Visitation of 1531. Exeter.
- Colby, F. T., ed. (1872). The Visitation of the County of Devon in the year 1620. Harleian Society, 1st ser. Vol. 6. London.
- Vivian, J. L., ed. (1895). The Visitations of the County of Devon: comprising the Heralds' Visitations of 1531, 1564 & 1620. Exeter. (see also: Devon heraldry)
- Listing of Devonshire "Ignobile Omnes", deemed by William Camden, Clarenceux King of Arms in 1620 (through his 2 deputies) "all ignoble", unable to prove their pedigrees to satisfy the heralds that they were entitled to be called armigerous or gentleman. To be classed as "ignobiles" was to be publicly shamed. (Published in Worthy, Charles, (Principal Assistant to Somerset Herald in Ordinary), "Devonshire Wills", London, 1896, derived from MS.Harl.1080,fo.342)

Dorset

- Metcalfe, Walter C., ed. (1887). The Visitation of Dorsetshire, A.D. 1565, by William Harvey, Clarenceux King of Arms. Exeter: William Pollard & Co.
- Rylands, J. P., ed. (1885). The Visitation of the County of Dorset, taken in the year 1623, by Henry St George, Richmond Herald, and Sampson Lennard, Bluemantle Pursuivant, marshals and deputies to William Camden, Clarenceux King of Arms. Harleian Society. Vol. 20. London.
- Squibb, G. D., ed. (1977). The Visitation of Dorset, 1677, made by Sir Edward Bysshe, knight, Clarenceux King of Arms. Harleian Society, 1st ser. Vol. 117. London.

County Durham

- Foster, Joseph, ed. (1887). Pedigrees recorded at the Visitations of the County Palatine of Durham made by William Flower, Norroy King-of-Arms, in 1575, by Richard St George, Norroy King-of-Arms, in 1615, and by William Dugdale, Norroy King-of-Arms, in 1666. London.

Essex

- Metcalfe, W. C., ed. (1878). The Visitations of Essex by Hawley, 1552; Hervy, 1558; Cooke, 1570; Raven, 1612; and Owen and Lilley, 1634; to which are added miscellaneous Essex pedigrees from various Harleian manuscripts, with an appendix containing Berry's Essex pedigrees, Part I. Harleian Society, 1st ser. Vol. 13. London.
- Metcalfe, W. C., ed. (1879). The Visitations of Essex by Hawley, 1552; Hervy, 1558; Cooke, 1570; Raven, 1612; and Owen and Lilley, 1634; to which are added miscellaneous Essex pedigrees from various Harleian manuscripts, with an appendix containing Berry's Essex pedigrees, Part II. Harleian Society, 1st ser. Vol. 14. London.
- Howard, J. J., ed. (1888). A Visitation of the County of Essex, begun AD 1664, finished AD 1668, by Sir Edward Bysshe, knight, Clarenceux King of Arms. London: Mitchell and Hughes.

Gloucestershire

- Maclean, Sir John; Heane, W.C., eds. (1885). The Visitation of the County of Gloucester, taken in the year 1623, by Henry Chitty and John Phillipot as deputies to William Camden, Clarenceux King of Arms; with pedigrees from the heralds' visitation of 1569 and 1582–3, and sundry miscellaneous pedigrees. Harleian Society, 1st ser. Vol. 21. London.
- Fitz-Roy Fenwick, T.; Metcalfe, Walter C., eds. (1884). The Visitation of the County of Gloucester, begun by Thomas May, Chester, and Gregory King, Rouge Dragon, in 1682, and finished by Henry Dethick, Richmond, and the said Rouge Dragon, 1683. Exeter: W. Pollard.

Hampshire

- Rylands, W. H., ed. (1913). Pedigrees from the Visitation of Hampshire made by Thomas Benolt, Clarenceulx, Anno 1530; enlarged with the Visitation of the same county made by Robert Cooke, Clarenceulx, Anno 1575, both which are continued with the Visitation made by John Phillipott, Somersett (for William Camden, Clarenceux) in Anno 1622, most part then don and finished in Anno 1634: as collected by Richard Mundy in Harleian MS no. 1544. Harleian Society, 1st ser. Vol. 64. London.
- Squibb, G. D., ed. (1991). The Visitation of Hampshire and the Isle of Wight 1686 made by Sir Henry St George, Knight. Harleian Society, new ser. Vol. 10. London. ISBN 0951333526.

Herefordshire

- Weaver, Frederic William, ed. (1886). The Visitation of Herefordshire made by Robert Cooke, Clarencieux, in 1569. Exeter: William Pollard.
- Siddons, M. P., ed. (2002). The Visitation of Herefordshire 1634. Harleian Society, new ser. Vol. 15. London. ISBN 0954044312.

Hertfordshire

- Metcalfe, W. C., ed. (1886). The Visitations of Hertfordshire, made by Robert Cooke, esq, Clarencieux, in 1572, and Sir Richard St George, Kt, Clarencieux, in 1634, with Hertfordshire pedigrees from Harleian MS 6147. Harleian Society, 1st ser. Vol. 22. London.

Huntingdonshire

- Ellis, Sir Henry, ed. (1849). The Visitation of the County of Huntingdon, under the authority of William Camden, Clarenceux King of Arms, by his deputy, Nicholas Charles, Lancaster Herald, A.D. 1613. Camden Society, 1st ser. Vol. 43. London: Camden Society.
- Bedells, J.; Grant, J.; Woodcock, T., eds. (2000). The Visitation of the County of Huntingdon 1684 by Sir Henry St George. Harleian Society, new ser. Vol. 13 (2nd ed.). London. ISBN 0951333577.

Kent

- Bannerman, W. B., ed. (1923). The Visitations of Kent: Part I: Taken in the years 1530–1 by Thomas Benolte, Clarenceux, and 1754 by Robert Cooke, Clarenceux. Harleian Society, 1st ser. Vol. 74. London.
- Bannerman, W. B., ed. (1924). The Visitations of Kent: Part II: Taken in the years 1574 and 1592 by Robert Cooke, Clarenceux. Harleian Society, 1st ser. Vol. 75. London.
- Hovenden R., ed. (1898). The Visitation of Kent, taken in the years 1619–1621 by John Philipot, Rouge Dragon, marshal and deputy to William Camden, Clarenceux. Harleian Society, 1st ser. Vol. 42. London.
- Armytage, Sir George J., ed. (1906). A Visitation of the County of Kent, begun Anno Dni 1663, finished Anno Dni 1668. Harleian Society, 1st ser. Vol. 54. London.

Lancashire

- Langton, William, ed. (1876). The Visitation of Lancashire and a part of Cheshire, made in the twenty-fourth year of the reign of King Henry the Eighth, A.D. 1533, by special commission of Thomas Benalt, Clarencieux: Part I. Chetham Society. Vol. 98. Manchester: Chetham Society.
- Langton, William, ed. (1882). The Visitation of Lancashire and a part of Cheshire, made in the twenty-fourth year of the reign of King Henry the Eighth, A.D. 1533, by special commission of Thomas Benalt, Clarencieux: Part II. Chetham Society. Vol. 110. Manchester: Chetham Society.
- Raines, F. R., ed. (1870). The Visitation of the County Palatine of Lancaster, made in the year 1567, by William Flower, Esq., Norroy King of Arms. Chetham Society. Vol. 81. Manchester: Chetham Society.
- Raines, F. R., ed. (1871). The Visitation of the County Palatine of Lancaster, made in the year 1613, by Richard St George, Esq., Norroy King of Arms. Chetham Society. Vol. 82. Manchester: Chetham Society.
- Raines, F. R., ed. (1872). The Visitation of the County Palatine of Lancaster, made in the year 1664–5, by Sir William Dugdale, Knight, Norroy King of Arms: Part I. Chetham Society. Vol. 84. Manchester: Chetham Society.
- Raines, F. R., ed. (1872). The Visitation of the County Palatine of Lancaster, made in the year 1664–5, by Sir William Dugdale, Knight, Norroy King of Arms: Part II. Chetham Society. Vol. 85. Manchester: Chetham Society.
- Raines, F. R., ed. (1873). The Visitation of the County Palatine of Lancaster, made in the year 1664–5, by Sir William Dugdale, Knight, Norroy King of Arms: Part III. Chetham Society. Vol. 88. Manchester: Chetham Society.

Leicestershire

- Fetherston, J., ed. (1870). The Visitation of the County of Leicester in the year 1619, taken by William Camden, Clarenceux King of Arms. Harleian Society, 1st ser. Vol. 2. London.

Lincolnshire

- Metcalfe, Walter C., ed. (1881). The Visitation of the County of Lincoln in 1562–4. London: G. Bell & Sons.
- Metcalfe, Walter C., ed. (1882). The Visitation of the County of Lincoln, 1592. London: G. Bell & Son.
- Gibbons, A., ed. (1898). Notes on the Visitation of Lincolnshire, 1634. Lincoln: J. Williamson.
- Green, Everard; Rylands, W. Harry, eds. (1917). The Visitation of the County of Lincoln made by Sir Edward Bysshe, Knight, Clarenceux King of Arms, in the Year of Our Lord 1666 (PDF). Lincoln Record Society. Vol. 8. Horncastle: Lincoln Record Society.

London

- Wagner, A. R. (1956). "The Visitation of London 1530". Heralds and Heraldry in the Middle Ages (2nd ed.). Oxford: Oxford University Press. pp. 139–46.
- Howard, J. J.; Armytage, G.J., eds. (1869). The Visitation of London in the year 1568, taken by Robert Cooke, Clarenceux King of Arms, and since augmented both with descents and arms. Harleian Society, 1st ser. Vol. 1. London.
- Rawlins, S. R., ed. (1963). Visitation of London, 1568, with additional pedigrees, 1569–90, the arms of the city companies, and a London subsidy roll, 1589: from the transcripts prepared and annotated by the late H. Stanford London. Harleian Society, 1st ser. Vol. 109/110. London.
- Howard, J. J.; Chester, J. L., eds. (1880). The Visitation of London, Anno Domini 1633, 1634 and 1635, made by Henry St George, Kt, Richmond Herald, and deputy marshall to Sir Richard St George, Kt, Clarencieux King of Armes: Vol. I. Harleian Society, 1st ser. Vol. 15. London.
- Howard, J. J.; Chester, J. L., eds. (1883). The Visitation of London, Anno Domini 1633, 1634 and 1635, made by Henry St George, Kt, Richmond Herald, and deputy marshall to Sir Richard St George, Kt, Clarencieux King of Armes: Vol. II. Harleian Society, 1st ser. Vol. 17. London.
- Whitmore, J. B.; Clarke, A. W. H, eds. (1940). London Visitation Pedigrees, 1664. Harleian Society, 1st ser. Vol. 92. London.
- Wales, T. C.; Hartley, C. P., eds. (2004). The Visitation of London begun in 1687: Part 1. Harleian Society, new ser. Vol. 16. London. ISBN 0951333585.
- Wales, T. C.; Hartley, C. P., eds. (2004). The Visitation of London begun in 1687: Part 2. Harleian Society, new ser. Vol. 17. London. ISBN 0951333593.

Middlesex

- Foster, Joseph, ed. (1887). The Visitation of Middlesex, began in the year 1663, by William Ryley, Esq., Lancaster, and Henry Dethick, Rouge Croix, Marshalls and Deputies to Sir Edward Bysshe, Clarencieux: as recorded in the College of Arms (D. 17.). London.

Norfolk

- Dashwood, G. H., ed. (1878). The Visitation of Norfolk in the year 1563, taken by William Harvey, Clarenceux King of Arms: Volume 1. Norwich. (or archive.org text)
- Bulwer, Brigadier-General E. E. G., ed. (1895). The Visitation of Norfolk in the year 1563, taken by William Harvey, Clarenceux King of Arms: Volume 2. Norwich.
- Rye, W., ed. (1891). The Visitacion of Norffolk, made and taken by William Harvey, Clarencieux King of Arms, Anno 1563, enlarged with another Visitacion made by Clarenceux Cooke, with many other descents; as also the Visitation made by John Raven, Richmond, Anno 1613. Harleian Society, 1st ser. Vol. 32. London.
- Clarke, A. W. H.; Campling, A., eds. (1933). The Visitation of Norfolk, Anno Domini 1664, made by Sir Edward Bysshe, Clarenceux King of Arms: Vol. I: A–L. Harleian Society, 1st ser. Vol. 85. London.
- Clarke, A. W. H.; Campling, A., eds. (1934). The Visitation of Norfolk, Anno Domini 1664, made by Sir Edward Bysshe, Clarenceux King of Arms: Vol. II: M–Z. Harleian Society, 1st ser. Vol. 86. London.

Northamptonshire

- Metcalfe, Walter C., ed. (1887). The Visitations of Northamptonshire made in 1564 and 1618–19, with Northamptonshire Pedigrees from various Harleian MSS. London: Mitchell and Hughes.
- Longden, Henry Isham, ed. (1935). The Visitation of the County of Northampton in the year 1681. Harleian Society, 1st ser. Vol. 87. London.

Northumberland

- Marshall, George W., ed. (1878). The Visitation of Northumberland in 1615. London: Mitchell and Hughes.
- Foster, Joseph, ed. (1891). Pedigrees recorded at the Heralds' Visitations of the County of Northumberland, made by Richard St George, Norroy King of Arms in 1615, and by William Dugdale, Norroy King of Arms in 1666. Newcastle-upon-Tyne: Browne and Browne.

Nottinghamshire

- Marshall, G. W., ed. (1871). The Visitations of the County of Nottingham in the years 1569 and 1614, with many other descents of the same county. Harleian Society, 1st ser. Vol. 4. London.
- Train, K. S. S., ed. (1950). Nottinghamshire Visitation, 1662–1664. Thoroton Society Record Series. Vol. 13. Nottingham: Thoroton Society.
- Squibb, G. D., ed. (1986). The Visitation of Nottinghamshire begun in 1662 and finished in 1664 made by William Dugdale. Harleian Society, new ser. Vol. 5. London. ISBN 095002077X.
- Ireland, G.; Squibb, G. D., eds. (1987). Dugdale's Nottinghamshire and Derbyshire Visitation Papers. Harleian Society, new ser. Vol. 6. London. ISBN 0950020788.

Oxfordshire

- Turner, W. H., ed. (1871). The Visitations of the County of Oxford, taken in the years 1566, by William Harvey, Clarencieux; 1574 by Richard Lee, Portcullis; and in 1634 by John Philpott, Somerset, and William Ryly, Bluemantle, deputies of Sir John Borrough, Kt, Garter, and Richard St George, Kt, Clarencieux; together with the gatherings of Oxfordshire, collected by Richard Lee in 1574. Harleian Society, 1st ser. Vol. 5. London.
- Squibb, G. D., ed. (1993). The Visitation of Oxfordshire, 1669 and 1675. Harleian Society, new ser. Vol. 12. London. ISBN 0951333542.

Rutland

- Armytage, G. J., ed. (1870). The Visitation of the County of Rutland in the year 1618–19, taken by William Camden, Clarenceux King of Arms, and other descents of families not in the visitation. Harleian Society, 1st ser. Vol. 3. London.
- Rylands, W. H.; Bannerman, W. B., eds. (1922). The Visitation of the County of Rutland begun by Fran. Burghill, Somerset, and Gregory King, Rougedragon, in Trinity Vacation 1681, carried on and finished by Tho. May, Chester Herald, and the said Rougedragon Pursuivt. in Hilary and Trinity Vacation 1682, by virtue of several deputacions from Sir Henry St George, Kt, Clarenceux King of Arms. Harleian Society, 1st ser. Vol. 73. London.

Shropshire

- Grazebrook, G.; Rylands, J. P., eds. (1889). The Visitation of Shropshire, taken in the year 1623 by Robert Tresswell, Somerset Herald, and Augustine Vincent, Rouge Croix Pursuivant of Arms, marshals and deputies to William Camden, Clarenceux King of Arms; with additions from the pedigrees of Shropshire gentry taken by the heralds in the years 1569 and 1584, and other sources: Part I. Harleian Society, 1st ser. Vol. 28. London.
- Grazebrook, G.; Rylands, J. P., eds. (1889). The Visitation of Shropshire, taken in the year 1623 by Robert Tresswell, Somerset Herald, and Augustine Vincent, Rouge Croix Pursuivant of Arms, marshals and deputies to William Camden, Clarenceux King of Arms; with additions from the pedigrees of Shropshire gentry taken by the heralds in the years 1569 and 1584, and other sources: Part II. Harleian Society, 1st ser. Vol. 29. London.

Somerset

- Weaver, Frederic William, ed. (1885). The Visitations of the County of Somerset, in the years 1531 and 1573, together with additional pedigrees, chiefly from the Visitation of 1591. Exeter: W. Pollard.
- Colby, F. T., ed. (1876). The Visitation of the County of Somerset in the year 1623. Harleian Society, 1st ser. Vol. 11. London.
- Squibb, G. D., ed. (1992). The Visitation of Somerset and the City of Bristol, 1672. Harleian Society, new ser. Vol. 11. London. ISBN 0951333534.

Staffordshire

- Grazebrook, H. Sidney, ed. (1882). The Visitacion of Staffordschire made by Robert Glover, al's Somerset Herald, mareschall to William Flower, al's Norry Kinge of Armes, anno D'ni 1583. Collections for a History of Staffordshire. Vol. 3. London: William Salt Archaeological Society.
- Grazebrook, H. Sidney, ed. (1885). The Heraldic Visitations of Staffordshire, made by Sir Richard St George, Norroy, in 1614, and by Sir William Dugdale, Norroy, in the years 1663 and 1664. Collections for a History of Staffordshire. Vol. 5. London: William Salt Archaeological Society.
- Armytage, Sir George J.; Rylands, W. H., eds. (1912). Staffordshire Pedigrees: based on the Visitation of that County made by William Dugdale, esquire, Norroy King of Arms, in the years 1663–1664, from the original manuscript written by Gregory King (successively Rouge Dragon and Lancaster Herald) during the years 1680 to 1700. Harleian Society, 1st ser. Vol. 63. London.

Suffolk

- Metcalfe, Walter C., ed. (1882). The Visitations of Suffolk made by Hervey, Clarenceux, 1561, Cooke, Clarenceux, 1577, and Raven, Richmond Herald, 1612, with notes and an appendix of additional Suffolk Pedigrees. Exeter: W. Pollard.
- Howard, Joseph Jackson, ed. (1866). The Visitation of Suffolke, made by William Hervey, Clarenceux King of Arms, 1561, with additions from family documents, original wills, Jermyn, Davy, and other MSS, &c.: Vol 1. Lowestoft & London.
  - Archive.org text
- Howard, Joseph Jackson, ed. (1868). The Visitation of Suffolke, made by William Hervey, Clarenceux King of Arms, 1561, with additions from family documents, original wills, Jermyn, Davy, and other MSS, &c.: Vol 2. Lowestoft & London.
  - Archive.org text
- Corder, J., ed. (1981). The Visitation of Suffolk 1561, made by William Hervy, Clarenceux King of Arms: Part 1. Harleian Society, new ser. Vol. 2. London. ISBN 0950020745.
- Corder, J., ed. (1984). The Visitation of Suffolk 1561, made by William Hervy, Clarenceux King of Arms: Part 2. Harleian Society, new ser. Vol. 3. London. ISBN 0950020753.
- Rylands, W. H., ed. (1910). A Visitation of the County of Suffolk, begun Anno Dni 1664 and finished Anno Dni 1668, by Sir Edward Bysshe, Kt, Clarenceux King of Arms. Harleian Society, 1st ser. Vol. 61. London.

Surrey

- Bannerman, W. B., ed. (1899). The Visitations of the County of Surrey made and taken in the years 1530 by Thomas Benolte, Clarenceux King of Arms; 1572 by Robert Cooke, Clarenceux King of Arms; and 1623 by Samuel Thompson, Windsor Herald, and Augustin Vincent, Rouge Croix Pursuivant, marshals and deputies to William Camden, Clarenceux King of Arms. Harleian Society, 1st ser. Vol. 43. London.
- Armytage, Sir George J., ed. (1910). A Visitation of the County of Surrey, begun Anno Dni 1662, finished Anno Dni 1668. Harleian Society, 1st ser. Vol. 60. London.

Sussex

- Bannerman, W. Bruce, ed. (1905). The Visitations of the County of Sussex made and taken in the years 1530 by Thomas Benolte, Clarenceux King of Arms; and 1633–4 by John Philipot, Somerset Herald, and George Owen, York Herald, for Sir John Burroughs, Garter, and Sir Richard St George, Clarenceux. Harleian Society, 1st ser. Vol. 53. London.
- Hughes Clarke, A. W., ed. (1937). The Visitation of Sussex, Anno Domini 1662, made by Sir Edward Bysshe, Knt, Clarenceux King of Arms. Harleian Society, 1st ser. Vol. 89. London.

Warwickshire

- Fetherston, J., ed. (1877). The Visitation of the County of Warwick in the year 1619, taken by William Camden, Clarencieux King of Arms. Harleian Society, 1st ser. Vol. 12. London.
- Rylands, W. H., ed. (1911). The Visitation of the County of Warwick, begun by Thomas May, Chester, and Gregory King, Rouge-Dragon, in Hilary Vacacion 1682, reviewed by them in the Trinity Vacacion following, and finished by Henry Dethick, Richmond, and the said Rouge Dragon Pursuivant, in Trinity Vacation 1683, by virtue of several deputations from Sir Henry St George, Clarenceux King of Arms. Harleian Society, 1st ser. Vol. 62. London.

Westmorland

- Bridges, Charles, ed. (1853). The Heraldic Visitation of Westmoreland: made in the year 1615, by Sir Richard St George. London: J.G. Bell.
- Foster, Joseph, ed. (1891). Pedigrees Recorded at the Heralds' Visitations of the counties of Cumberland and Westmorland; made by Richard St George, Norroy, King of Arms in 1615, and by William Dugdale, Norroy, King of Arms in 1666. Carlisle: C. Thurman and Sons.

Wiltshire

- Metcalfe, Walter C., ed. (1897). The Visitation of Wiltshire 1565, by William Harvey, Clarenceux King of Arms. Exeter: William Pollard & Co.
- Marshall, George W., ed. (1882). The Visitation of Wiltshire, 1623. London: G. Bell & Sons.
- Squibb, G. D., ed. (1954). Wiltshire Visitation Pedigrees, 1623, with additional pedigrees and arms collected by Thomas Lyte of Lyte's Cary, Co. Somerset 1628. Harleian Society, 1st ser. Vol. 105/106. London.

Worcestershire

- Phillimore, W. P. W., ed. (1888). The Visitation of the County of Worcester made in the year 1569, with other pedigrees relating to that county from Richard Mundy's collection. Harleian Society, 1st ser. Vol. 27. London.
- Butler, A. T., ed. (1938). The Visitation of Worcestershire, 1634. Harleian Society, 1st ser. Vol. 90. London.

Yorkshire

- Norcliffe, Charles Best, ed. (1881). The Visitation of Yorkshire in the years 1563 and 1564, made by William Flower, esquire, Norroy King of Arms. Harleian Society, 1st ser. Vol. 16. London.
- Foster, Joseph, ed. (1875). The Visitation of Yorkshire, made in the years 1584/5, by Robert Glover, Somerset Herald; to which is added the subsequent Visitation made in 1612, by Richard St George, Norroy King of Arms, with several additional pedigrees, including "The Arms taken out of Churches and Houses at Yorkshire Visitation, 1584/5", "Sir William Fayrfax' Booke of Arms," and other heraldic lists, with copious indices. London.
- Davies, Robert, ed. (1859). The Visitation of the County of Yorke, begun in Ao Dni MDCLXV and finished Ao Dni MDCLXVI, by William Dugdale, Esq., Norroy King of Arms. Surtees Society. Vol. 36. Durham: Surtees Society.
- Clay, J. W., ed. (1899). Dugdale's Visitation of Yorkshire, with additions: Vol. 1. Exeter: W. Pollard & Co.
- Clay, J. W., ed. (1907). Dugdale's Visitation of Yorkshire, with additions: Vol. 2. Exeter: W. Pollard & Co.
- Clay, J. W., ed. (1917). Dugdale's Visitation of Yorkshire, with additions: Vol. 3. Exeter: W. Pollard & Co.

=== Wales ===
- Siddons, M. P., ed. (1996). Visitations by the Heralds in Wales. Harleian Society, new ser. Vol. 14. London. ISBN 0951333569.
- Meyrick, S. R., ed. (1846). Heraldic Visitations of Wales and Part of the Marches; between the years 1586 and 1613, under the authority of Clarencieux and Norroy, two Kings at Arms, by Lewis Dwnn, Deputy Herald at Arms. Llandovery: Society for the Publication of Ancient Welsh Manuscripts.

== See also ==
- College of Arms
- Court of the Lord Lyon
- King of Arms

== Bibliography ==
- Ailes, Adrian (2009). "The Development of the Heralds' Visitations in England and Wales 1450–1600". Coat of Arms. 3rd ser. 5: 7–23.
- Ailes, Adrian (2014). "Artists and artwork of the heraldic visitations 1530–1687". Coat of Arms. 3rd ser. 10: 69–82.
- Humphery-Smith, Cecil R. (1997). Armigerous Ancestors: a catalogue of sources for the study of the visitations of the heralds in the 16th and 17th centuries. Canterbury: Family History Books. ISBN 0951198718. (contains lists and indexes of the manuscript copies and published editions of the visitations, and family names included within them)
- Squibb, G. D., ed. (1978) [1964]. Visitation Pedigrees and the Genealogist (2nd ed.). London: Pinhorns. ISBN 9780901262196.
- Squibb, G. D., ed. (1985). Munimenta Heraldica, MCCCCLXXXIV to MCMLXXXIV. Harleian Society, new ser. Vol. 4. London. ISBN 0-9500207-6-1. (contains texts of visitation patents of aid, commissions, appointments of deputies etc.)
- Styles, Philip (1953). "The Heralds' Visitation of Warwickshire, 1682–3". Transactions and Proceedings of the Birmingham Archaeological Society. 71: 96–134.
- Verasanso, Janet (2001). "The Staffordshire Heraldic Visitations: their nature and function". Midland History. 26: 128–43. doi:10.1179/mdh.2001.26.1.128. S2CID 162252973.
- Wagner, Anthony (1952). The Records and Collections of the College of Arms. London: Burke's Peerage.
- Wagner, A. R. (1956). Heralds and Heraldry in the Middle Ages (2nd ed.). Oxford: Oxford University Press.
- Wagner, Sir Anthony (1967). Heralds of England. London: H.M.S.O.
- Yorke, Robert (2023). A Catalogue of Records in the College of Arms: Records Volume 1: Record Manuscripts of the Tudor Visitations mainly contained in the series D–H. London: College of Arms. ISBN 978-0-9506980-3-8. (a catalogue of the office copies of visitations 1530–1592, with references to other manuscript copies, published editions, and name indexes)
