= Robert Cooke (officer of arms) =

English Officer of Arms

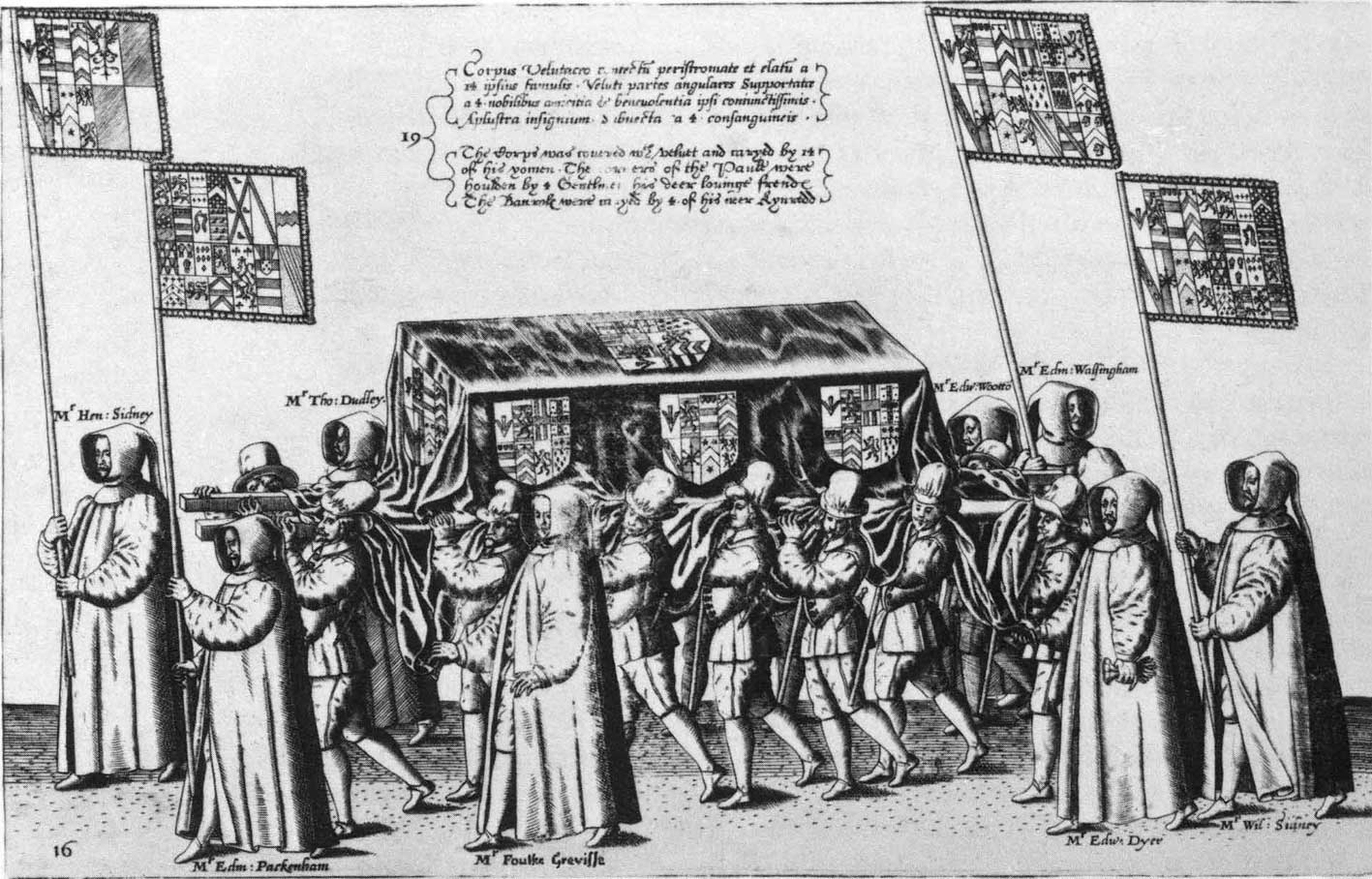
Sir Philip Sidney's funeral procession, under Robert Cooke, King of Arms, in 1587

Arms of Robert Cooke: Gules, a cinquefoil ermine in an orle of crosses crosslet fitchy argent; crest: A dexter hand in armour proper joined to a wing or and holding a sword erect proper entwined with a branch of (? olive) vert

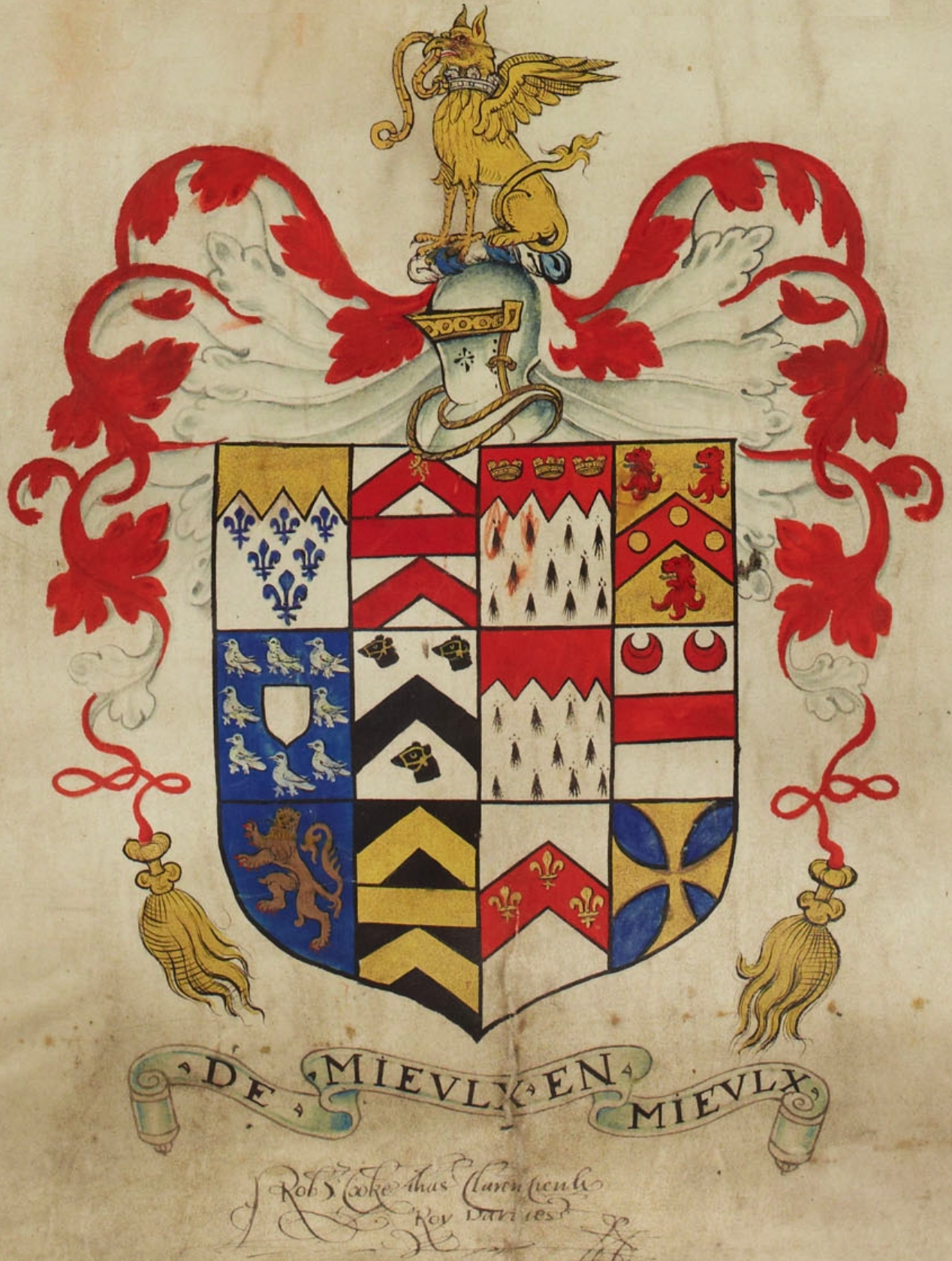
Detail from foot of 1573 illuminated pedigree of the Paston family of Norfolk made by Robert Cooke and signed by him in Latin below as Rob(ertu)s Cooke alias Clarencieulx Roy d'Armes

Robert Cooke (born c. 1535, died 1592–3) was an English Officer of Arms during the reign of Elizabeth I, who rose swiftly through the ranks of the College of Arms to Clarenceux King of Arms, serving in that office from 1567 until his death in 1592–3.

Cooke served as Deputy Earl Marshal at the funeral of Sir Philip Sidney in 1587, but was later accused by some fellow heralds of granting arms to unworthy men for personal gain.

== Life and work ==
Educated at Kirkham Grammar School from a recusant family, Cooke was brought up in the household of Sir Edmund Brudenell, an ardent genealogist. He went up to St. John's College, Cambridge, graduating in 1558. He was appointed Rose Blanche Pursuivant Extraordinary, 25 January 1561–2 and succeeded William Flower as Chester Herald of Arms four days later. Both events were recorded in the diary of Henry Machyn, who twice identified Cooke as the servant of Lord Robert Dudley. Cooke was promoted to Clarenceux King of Arms on 21 May 1567. Cooke served as Acting Garter King of Arms, after the death of Sir Gilbert Dethick on 3 October 1584, until the permanent appointment of Sir Gilbert's son William Dethick on 21 April 1586. As Acting Garter, Cooke with Robert Glover, Somerset Herald, accompanied the Earl of Derby to France to invest King Henri III with the Garter in 1584.

As Clarenceux, Cooke was responsible for arranging the funerals of all knights resident south of the River Trent In this capacity he oversaw the "magnificent" state funeral at St Paul's Cathedral of Sir Philip Sidney, who died in Flanders on 17 October 1586. Detailed drawings of the funeral procession on 16 February 1587, with its hundreds of mourners, were published as The Procession at the Obsequies of Sir Philip Sydney, Knight, drawn and invented by Thomas Lant, Gentleman, servant to the said honourable Knight, and engraven on copper by Derick Theodore de Brijon, in the City of London. 1587.

Cooke had sought appointment as Garter (with the support of Dudley, by then the powerful Earl of Leicester), and William Dethick, who secured the appointment, later charged Cooke with encroaching on the traditional privileges of Garter King of Arms. In 1595, after Cooke's death, William Segar, Norroy King of Arms, sided with Dethick, criticising Cooke for his inability to write clearly and for making many grants of arms to "base and unworthy persons for his private gaine onely." Ralph Brooke, York Herald and sometimes deputy to Cooke, complained in 1614 that Cooke had granted more than 500 new coats of arms during his tenure.

=== Visitations ===
In 1530, Henry VIII had issued an instruction governing the conduct of heraldic visitations, in which Clarenceux and Norroy Kings of Arms (or their deputies) were to tour their areas of authority, recording coats of arms and pedigrees of armigers, with powers to forcibly prevent the bearing of unauthorised arms.

As Chester Herald and deputy to William Harvey, who preceded him as Clarenceux, Cooke conducted visitations of Worcestershire in 1560, Devonshire in 1562, Lincolnshire in 1562 and 1564, and Leicestershire and Warwickshire in 1563.

As Clarenceux, Cooke conducted visitations of London in 1568 and again in 1593; Worcestershire in 1569; Herefordshire in 1569 and 1584; Worcester in 1569; Shropshire in 1569 and 1584; Essex in 1570 and 1583; Surrey, Hertfordshire and Middlesex in 1572; Devonshire in 1572; Somerset in 1573 and 1591; Cornwall in 1573; Kent in 1574 and 1589; Dorsetshire in 1574; Hampshire and Cambridgeshire in 1575; Suffolk in 1577; Buckinghamshire in 1580; Bedfordshire in 1582 and 1586; Gloucester in 1583; Berkshire in 1584; and Norfolk in 1589. Robert Glover, Somerset Herald, Richard Leigh (then Portcullis Pursuivant), and Ralph Brooke (then Rouge Croix Pursuivant), acted as Cooke's deputies on various visitations.

=== Other manuscripts ===
Cooke's invaluable writings in manuscript include An English Baronage, Heraldic Rudiments, An Ordinary of Arms and A Treatise on the Granting of Arms. On one copy of An English Baronage the antiquarian Sir Simonds d'Ewes wrote a title concluding "in which are a world of errors, ergo caveat lector."

== See also ==
- College of Arms

== Notes ==
Heraldic offices
| Preceded by William Flower | Chester Herald of Arms; 1562–1566 | Succeeded by John Hart |
| Preceded by William Harvey | Clarenceux King of Arms; 1567–1593 | Succeeded by Richard Leigh |
