= William Flower (officer of arms) =

English Officer of Arms

William Flower (1497/98–1588) was an English Officer of Arms in the reigns of Henry VIII, Edward VI, Mary I and Elizabeth I. He rose to the rank of Norroy King of Arms, serving in that capacity from 1562 until his death in 1588.

== Life and work ==
William Flower was born at York about 1498, and was probably the elder son of John Flower, tailor and corn merchant, of the parish of All Saints' Church, Pavement, York. Flower became Guisnes pursuivant extraordinary on the removal of Fulke ap Howell at Westminster, 10 June 1536. On 1 April 1543, while serving as Calais pursuivant extraordinary, he was sent to visit the merchants and marines who had been captured by the French and confined at Rouen. He was appointed Rouge Croix Pursuivant in 1544 and Chester Herald of Arms in 1546. He and Gilbert Dethick, Garter Principal King of Arms accompanied William Parr, 1st Marquess of Northampton, in his 1551 mission to Paris, to invest Henry II of France with the Order of the Garter. He received ten shillings per day for his "dyett" (food and lodging) on that mission. In 1555, Thomas Hawley, Clarenceux King of Arms, issued a patent in London authorising Flower to act as his marshal and deputy. Flower delivered a message in Edinburgh from the Duke of Norfolk on 16 February 1560 to Mary of Guise and her Scottish and French councillors. At first they spoke in the "Scottish tongue" but because he could not understand they continued in French. Flower recorded sharp answers from two Frenchmen, Henri Cleutin and Jacques de la Brosse.

Flower was promoted to Norroy King of Arms on 8 February 1562. A commission of visitation was issued to Flower on 10 July 1564, and he embarked on a series of visitations throughout the northern counties over the next eleven years. On 9 March 1580 he obtained a patent from Elizabeth joining his son-in-law, Robert Glover, Somerset Herald, with himself for the office of Norroy; the patent states that Flower was then eighty-two years of age.

William Flower married Helen Davyes. They had two sons and three daughters: Gilbert, Edward, Elizabeth, Jane, and Eleanor. Elizabeth was married c. 1570 to Robert Glover, Somerset Herald. After his death in 1588 she was married to a Mr. Woolward. Eleanor was married to James Barkstead.

Flower died at Windsor in the autumn of 1588. His will, dated 14 October 1588, was proved in London on 22 November of that year.

== Visitations ==
In 1530, Henry VIII had issued an instruction governing the conduct of heraldic visitations, in which Clarenceux and Norroy Kings of Arms (or their deputies) were to tour their areas of authority, recording coats of arms and pedigrees of arms holders, with powers to forcibly prevent the bearing of unauthorised arms. Flower's visitations began in 1563–64 and his last visitation was in 1575, with Glover acting as his deputy from 1564. The entry books of Flower's visitations of Yorkshire in 1563–1564 (printed, 1881), of Lancashire, 1567 (printed, 1870), of Nottingham, 1569 (printed 1871) and of Durham, 1575 (printed, 1820) are preserved in the College of Arms in London.

On 21 June 1578, Flower issued a printed proclamation as Norroy Herald and King of Heralds for the province of Trent, North East and Westward. This asserted that his deputy, the heraldic painter Peter Proby of West Chester would license heraldic painting and take fees, particularly for the arms painted on funeral equipment. Flower declared;

"I give my straight commandment to all Painters, Glaziers, Goldsmiths, Gravers, or any other that doth or hereafter shall use the arte of painting, that they nor any of them shall not from this present date exercise nor use any painting in any wise, appertaining to the office of armes, especially for Escutchons of armes, or banners, standards, pennons, hatchments, helms, crests, or any thing or thinges appertayning to funeralls of any personages, within my sayd province ..., without my special licence, or at least being licensed and sett on worke at such funeralls by my sayd Deputie Peter Proby."

== Arms ==
Coat of arms of William Flower
Crest An eagle's head erased sable ermined argent & with a gold crown about its neck. Escutcheon Sable ermined argent, a pierced cinquefoil ermine.

== See also ==
- Heraldry

== Notes ==
Heraldic offices
Preceded by Justinian Barker	Rouge Croix Pursuivant of Arms; 1544–46	Succeeded by Lawrence Dalton
Preceded by Randolph Jackson	Chester Herald of Arms; 1546–1561	Succeeded by Robert Cooke
Preceded by Lawrence Dalton	Norroy King of Arms; 1562–1588	Succeeded by vacant to 1592; Edmund Knight
