= Augustine Vincent =

English herald and antiquary

Augustine Vincent (c. 1584–1626) was an English herald and antiquary. He became involved in an antiquarian dispute between his friend William Camden and Ralph Brooke.

== Life ==
Augustine Vincent was born, presumably in Northamptonshire, in about 1584. He was the third and youngest son of Richard Vincent (died 1621) and his wife Elizabeth, daughter of Francis Hodgkin of Barton, Northamptonshire. He early obtained a post in the Tower of London. He had access to the documents preserved there and occupied himself in making extracts from them. He became known as an antiquary, and on 22 February 1616 was appointed by patent Rouge Rose Pursuivant Extraordinary. The College of Arms was at this time quarrelsome. Vincent was the friend of William Camden, who in 1618 appointed him his deputy to visit Northamptonshire and Rutland, thereby annoying those of the opposite party, some of whom were passed over in favour of a younger man. The practice of visitation by deputy was in 1619 the subject of a formal complaint on the part of Sir William Segar, Garter King of Arms, and Sir Richard St. George, Norroy King of Arms to the Earl Marshal. Camden, however, was able to justify himself. Vincent was constituted Rouge Croix Pursuivant by patent of 29 May 1621, and on 5 June 1624 became Windsor Herald.

He died on 11 January 1626, and was buried at the church of St Benet, Paul's Wharf.

== Works ==
Vincent's only publication arose from his taking Camden's side in his quarrel with Ralph Brooke, York Herald. Brooke's Discoverie, his first printed denunciation of Camden, appeared in 1599; the fifth edition of Camden's Britannia, containing a reply, in 1600; and Brooke's Catalogue of Kings, Princes, continuing the squabble, in 1619 (2nd edition, enlarged, 1622). In reply to Brooke's Catalogue Vincent produced his Discoverie of Errours in the first edition of Catalogue of Nobility published by Ralfe Brooke, Yorke Herald... at the end whereof is annexed a Review of a later edition by him Stolne into the World, 1621, London, 1622. This volume, like the first (but not the second) edition of Brooke's Catalogue, was printed by William Jaggard. Brooke had blamed Jaggard for some of the errors in the first edition of his Catalogue. In his Discoverie, Vincent gave Jaggard space to reply to Brooke's comments on his skill as a printer. When, in 1623, Jaggard completed the printing of the first folio edition of Shakespeare, he presented Vincent with one of the earliest copies from the press.

Vincent also made collections for a baronage of England, called the Herωologia Anglica, on which his son John afterwards worked. William Burton, the historian of Leicestershire, and John Weever, author of Ancient Funeral Monuments, both speak of help from Vincent.

== Family ==
Vincent married, on 30 June 1614, Elizabeth, third daughter of Vincent Primount of Canterbury, who came originally from Bivill la Baignard in Normandy. She married, before November 1630, Eusebius Catesby of Castor, Northamptonshire, and died on 6 August 1667. His son was also an antiquary.

== Collections ==
After his death, Vincent's collections found their way, through his son and then through Ralph Sheldon, to the College of Arms, where they remain.
