= Thomas Thompson (herald) =

Thomas Thompson (d. September 1641), herald, the son of Samuel Thompson, Windsor herald, was raised by his father to follow in his footsteps. He was appointed Rouge Dragon Pursuivant in the reign of James I. He married Elizabeth Bynd of Carshaltern, Surrey, as recorded in the 1623 visitation of Surrey conducted by his father. He conducted the visitation of Lincolnshire in 1634 with Henry Chitting, Chester herald. He was promoted to become Lancaster Herald in 1637. He lived in Streatham, where he died in September 1641.
