= St Benet's, Paul's Wharf =

St Benet Paul's Wharf
- Eglwys Bened Sant
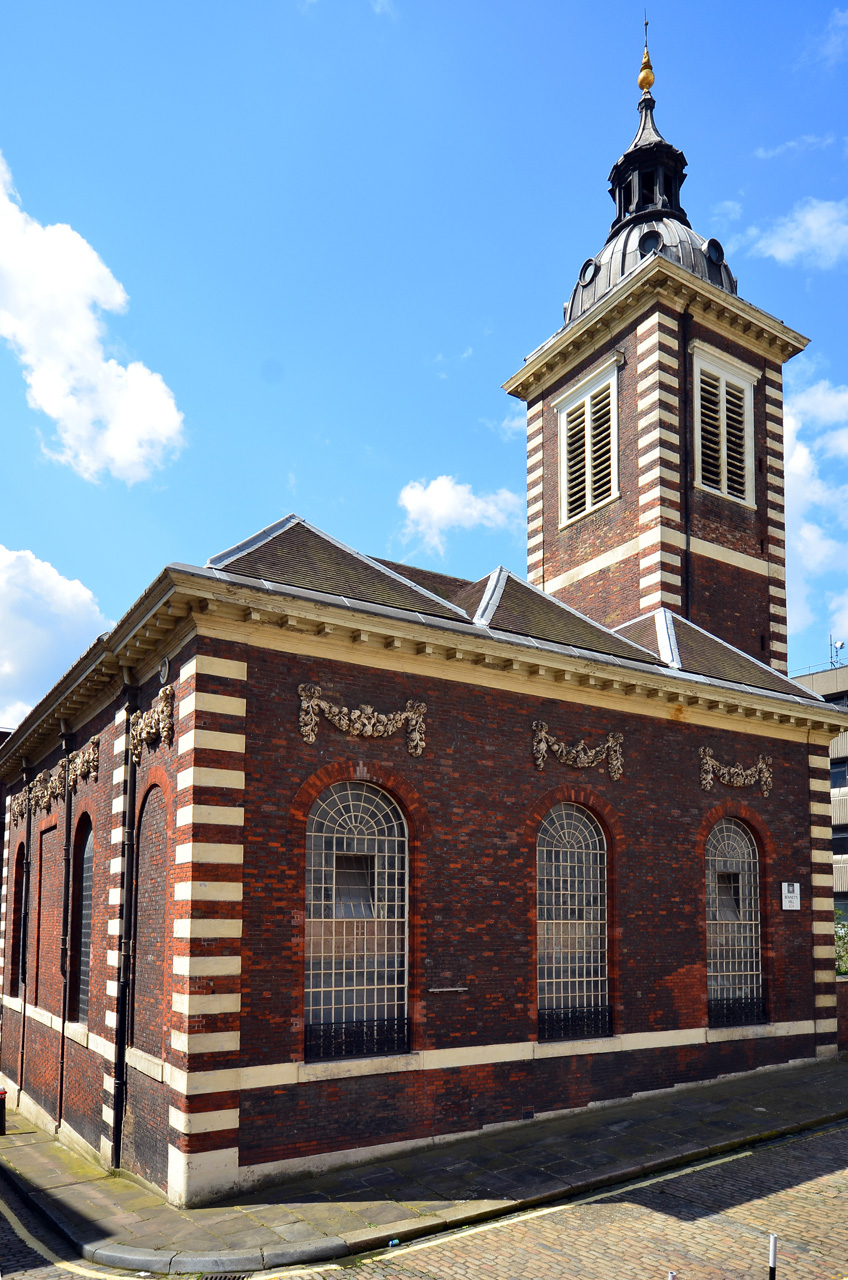

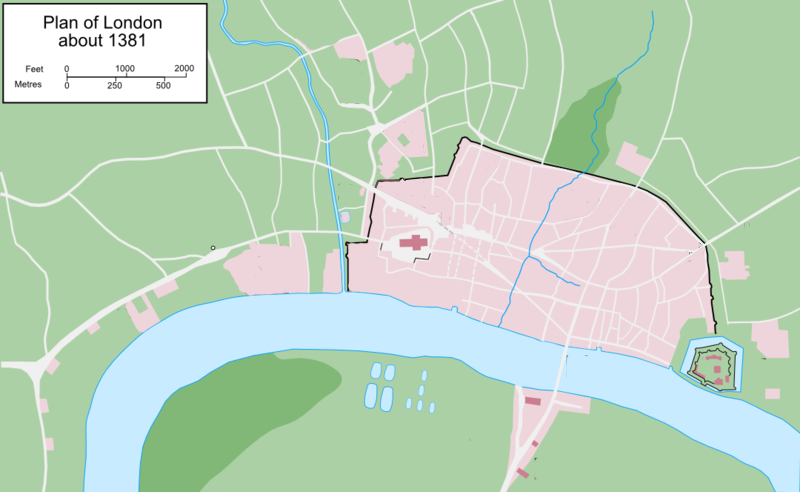
- Location within City of London Location within City of London in 1300
- 51°30′42.01″N 0°5′57.38″W
- Location: 93 Queen Victoria Street, London, EC4
- Language: Welsh
- Denomination: Anglican
- Previous denomination: Roman Catholicism (to 1534)
- Churchmanship: Conservative evangelical

History
- Founded: 1111
- Dedication: Benedict of Nursia

Architecture
- Heritage designation: Grade I listed building
- Architect(s): Christopher Wren, possibly Robert Hooke
- Style: English Baroque
- Completed: 1683

Specifications
- Height: 115 ft (35 m)

Administration
- Diocese: London

The Church of St Benet Paul's Wharf (Welsh: Eglwys Bened Sant) is a Welsh Anglican church in the City of London, England. Since 1556, it has also been the official church of the College of Arms in which many officers of arms have been buried. In 1666 it was destroyed in the Great Fire of London, after which it was rebuilt and merged with nearby St Peter's. The current church was designed by Sir Christopher Wren. It is one of only four churches in the City of London to escape damage during World War II.

== History ==
St Benet's traces its history back to the year 1111, when a church was built on the site and dedicated to St Benedict. Over time the name became St. Benet's Paul's Wharf after the hythe where the church was located. To the west of the site was the watergate of Baynard's Castle, which is referenced in the biographies of Queen Anne Boleyn and Lady Jane Grey. It is mentioned by William Shakespeare in his play Twelfth Night at Act 4 Scene 3, or Act 5 Scene 1, depending on the edition. Both the church and the castle were destroyed in the Great Fire of London in 1666. It was redesigned by the architect Christopher Wren, and reopened in 1683. The builder was Edward Strong the Elder.

On 2 March 1706, Henrietta Hobart married Charles Howard, 9th Earl of Suffolk, a captain in the 6th (Inniskilling) Dragoons there. (Henrietta Howard subsequently became mistress to the future King George II.)

The church was narrowly saved from destruction in the late 19th century, when its parish was merged with that of St Nicholas Cole Abbey. After an energetic campaign by its supporters, Queen Victoria in 1879 granted the church to Welsh Anglicans for services. St Benet's continues as London's Metropolitan Welsh church, with its services conducted in the Welsh language, and with English translation provided.

The parish is within the Conservative Evangelical tradition of the Church of England, and it has passed resolutions to reject the ordination of women and/or female leadership.

== Exterior ==
The church is of dark red brick, with alternating courses of Portland stone at the corners. The tower is situated to the north-west of the nave and is capped by a small lead dome, lantern and simple short spire.

== Interior ==
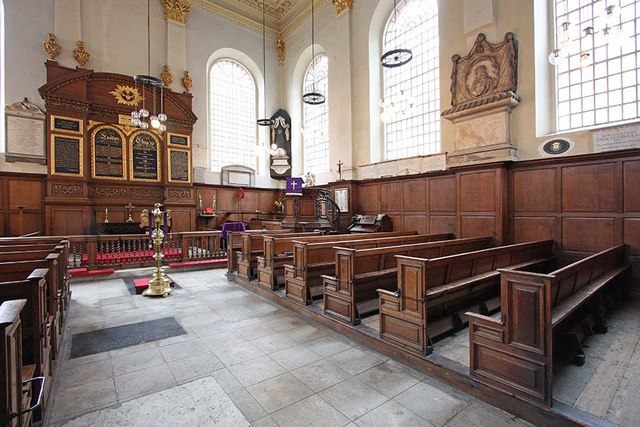
Interior of St Benet Paul's Wharf

The interior is almost a square. Unusually for a Wren church, the ceiling is flat rather than domed or barrel-vaulted. The north gallery was formerly used by the Doctors' Commons, and is now used by the College of Arms. Most of the original 17th-century furnishings are still intact, including the magnificent altar table, reredos and pulpit, designed by Grinling Gibbons. The lectern and baptismal font are also original.

The galleries are supported by Corinthian columns. There is a memorial to Inigo Jones, who was buried in the previous church, and a medallion bust of Sir Robert Wyseman, a benefactor of St Benet's who died in 1684.

== Notable people buried in the church ==
=== Officers of arms ===
As the official church of the College of Arms many Officers of arms were buried there:

- Hon. Sir George Rothe Bellew, Garter
- Sir Ralph Bigland, Garter
- Sir Anthony Richard Wagner, Garter
- Sir Gilbert Dethick, Garter
- Sir Henry St George, Garter
- John Riddell Bromhead Walker, Clarenceux
- George Drewry Squibb, Norfolk
- Rodney Onslow Dennys, Somerset
- Major Francis Jones, Wales
- John Philipot, Somerset
- John Charles Brooke, Somerset

=== Others ===
- Inigo Jones
- John Parr (embroiderer)

== See also ==
- Church in Wales
- The College of Arms
- List of churches and cathedrals of London
- List of Christopher Wren churches in London
