= Robert Glover (officer of arms) =

English genealogist (1544–1588)

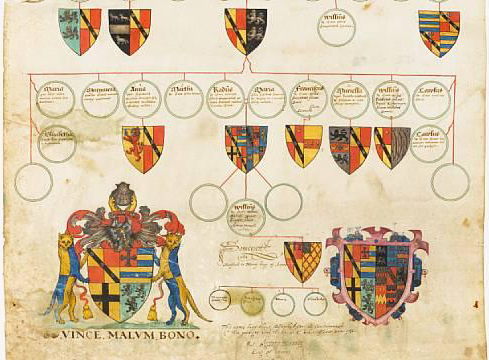
Pedigree of the De Euro family, of Northumberland, barons of Warkworth and Clavering, by Robert Glover.

Robert Glover (1544 – 10 April 1588) was an English officer of arms, genealogist and antiquarian in the reign of Elizabeth I. In the College of Arms, he rose to the rank of Somerset Herald of Arms, serving in that capacity from 1571 until his death in 1588. As marshal and deputy to his father-in-law, William Flower, Norroy King of Arms, he participated in heraldic visitations throughout northern England.

== Life and work ==
Robert Glover was the son of Thomas Glover of Ashford in Kent. He was appointed Portcullis Pursuivant of Arms in 1567 at the age of 24. Glover was well respected among contemporary kings of arms. He was especially highly regarded for his accuracy and extensive professional knowledge and was regarded as an authority by the highest officials.

Around 1570, he married Elizabeth Flower, daughter of William Flower, Norroy King of Arms. They had five children: Thomas, John, Robert, Ann, and Mildred.

Glover served as his father-in-law's deputy until his death. Glover was promoted to Somerset Herald of Arms in 1571. On 9 March 1580 Flower obtained a patent from Queen Elizabeth joining Glover with himself for the office of Norroy; the patent states that Flower was then eighty-two years of age.

In 1582, Glover accompanied Lord Willoughby to Denmark to invest Frederick II with the Order of the Garter, and in 1584 he accompanied Robert Cooke, Clarenceux King of Arms in attendance on the Earl of Derby when he presented the Garter to Henry III of France.

Glover died on 10 April 1588, aged 46, and was buried at St Giles-without-Cripplegate, London. His widow Elizabeth was left with five children and no way to provide for them; she was remarried within months and named as "Elizabeth Woolward" in her father's will, dated October of that same year.

== Visitations ==
In 1530, Henry VIII had issued an instruction governing the conduct of heraldic visitations, in which Clarenceux and Norroy Kings of Arms (or their deputies) were to tour their areas of authority, recording coats of arms and pedigrees of armigers, with powers to forcibly prevent the bearing of unauthorised arms. Flower's visitations began in 1563–64 and his last visitation was in 1575, with Glover acting as his deputy. The entry books of Flower's visitations of Yorkshire in 1563–1564 (printed, 1881), of Lancashire, 1567 (printed, 1870), of Nottingham, 1569 (printed 1871) and of Durham, 1575 (printed, 1820) are preserved in the College of Arms in London. A manuscript of the 1567 visitation in Glover's hand (in the British Museum) is frequently described as Glover's Visitation. This manuscript forms a folio volume of 104 pages, and includes the pedigrees of 112 families, each illustrated with armorial bearings.

Glover himself completed visitations of Cheshire in 1580 on behalf of Flower (published 1882), of Staffordshire in 1583, and of Yorkshire in 1584–85 (privately printed 1875).

== Genealogy ==
Glover was also an antiquarian and an early genealogist. Originally, visitations were written in narrative form and emphasised recording of armorial bearings. Glover introduced the copying of charters and other documents into the visitation records to support claims of ancestry, a marked innovation over the practice of his predecessors.

Glover left a number of manuscripts at his death. His pedigrees were used by the antiquarian William Camden in creating his Britannia (1594); indeed Ralph Brooke's attack on Camden accused him of misusing and misunderstanding Glover's work.

His nephew Thomas Milles edited Glover's Nobilitas Politica et Civilis for publication (London, 1608). His manuscript genealogies of the nobility in Latin were translated and edited by Milles, with assistance from Sir Robert Cotton, Robert Beale, Camden, Nicholas Charles, Michael Heneage, Thomas Talbot and Matthew Pateson, under the title The Catalogue of Honor, or Treasury of true Nobility, peculiar and proper to the Isle of Great Britaine (London, 1610). Glover's manuscripts A Catalogue of Northern Gentry whose surnames ended in son and Defence of the Title of Queen Elizabeth to the English Crown remain unpublished. His Ordinary of Arms was printed in Edmondson's Complete Body of Heraldry (1780).

== Arms ==
Coat of arms of Robert Glover
| Adopted 4 March 1577 Crest A Mercury's hat sable turned up argent & winged sable. Escutcheon Sable, a chevron ermine between 3 crescents argent. |

== Notes ==
Heraldic offices
| Preceded by Ralph Langman | Portcullis Pursuivant of Arms; 1567–1571 | Succeeded by Richard Lee |
| Preceded by Edmond Atkynson | Somerset Herald of Arms; 1571–1588 | Succeeded by William Segar |
