= Thomas Hawley (officer of arms) =

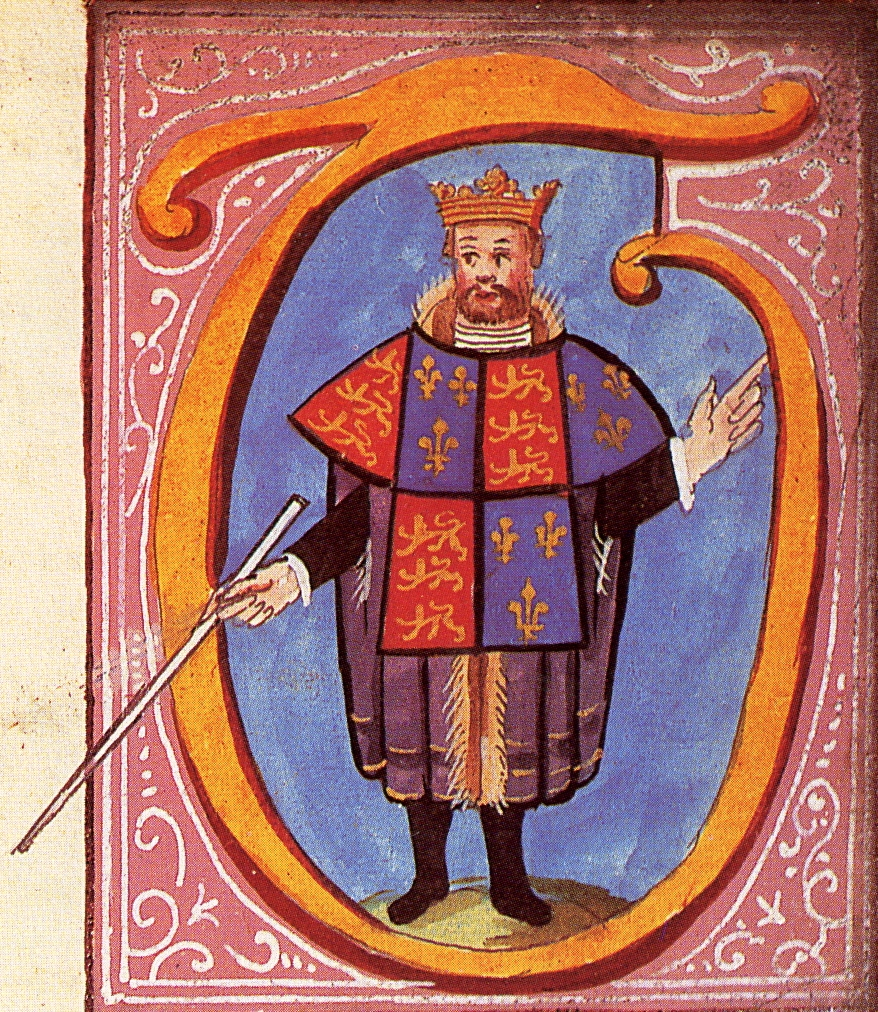
Clarenceux King of Arms Thomas Hawley as depicted in the initial letter of a grant of arms to John Fennar in 1556

Thomas Hawley (died 22 August 1557) was a long-serving officer of arms at the College of Arms in London. He began his career of royal service as a groom porter to Queen Margaret of Scotland from her marriage in 1503 until 1508. Although he may have been made Rose Blanche Pursuivant in the reign of King Henry VII, his first permanent heraldic appointment came in 1509.

== Heraldic career ==
King Henry VIII appointed Hawley to be Rouge Croix Pursuivant of Arms in Ordinary by letters patent dated 26 August 1509. It was in this capacity that he journeyed with the Earl of Surrey on the campaign of 1513 against King James IV of Scotland. Hawley was captured and detained as a prisoner before the Battle of Flodden, but released before the fighting actually started. On 1 November 1514 he was created Carlisle Herald in recognition of his diplomatic services in Scotland. The king also granted him an annuity of 20 marks.

As Carlisle, Hawley also performed the ceremonial and other duties of an officer of arms. In 1530 he was appointed the deputy to Thomas Benolt, Clarenceux King of Arms. In this capacity, he undertook a heraldic visitation of London churches on Benolt's behalf. He was charged "to reforme all false armorye & Armes devysed without auctoritie" (Wagner, Heralds and Heraldry, 9). His record of the occasion is the earliest existing account of a heraldic visitation. After several more diplomatic trips to Scotland, Hawley was made Norroy King of Arms by patent dated 15 June 1534. Hawley continued a long-running dispute with Garter Principal King of Arms over the privileges of their offices. On 19 May 1536 Hawley was appointed Clarenceux King of Arms. Visitation commissions were issued to Hawley in 1541, 1552, and 1555, but it is not certain if these were acted on.

Hawley died at his house in the Barbican, London on 22 August 1557. He was buried two days later in an elaborate ceremony at St Giles Cripplegate. He is not known to have married; his will appointed William Harvey, Norroy King of Arms, as his executor, also leaving him the substantial library that Hawley had inherited from his predecessor as Clarenceux, Thomas Benolt.

== Arms ==
Coat of arms of Thomas Hawley
Escutcheon Vert, a saltire engrailed argent.

== See also ==
- Heraldry
- Officer of arms
