= Richard Leigh (officer of arms) =

English officer of arms

Coat of arms of Richard Lee (Leigh)

Richard Leigh (c. 1531–1597) was an English officer of arms. He was created Portcullis Pursuivant in 1571 and in this role conducted visitations of Buckinghamshire, Oxfordshire and Shropshire on behalf of the Clarenceux King of Arms. He was promoted to Richmond Herald in 1592, in which role he conducted the visitation of Lincolnshire. Promoted to Clarenceux in 1594, he inherited his predecessor's dispute with William Dethick over their respective jurisdictions, during which in 1596 he had a copy made of a privy seal grant made by Henry VIII to Thomas Benolt. As Clarenceux he undertook visitations of Berkshire and Northamptonshire, but these were formally completed. He died in September 1597 and was buried at St Alphage London Wall.
