= Carolina Herald =

Heraldic office of the Province of Carolina

The Carolina Herald was the principal herald of the Province of Carolina.

Its first Herald was Laurence Cromp, Esq., who was appointed by letters patent in 1705 by Anne, Queen of Great Britain and the Lords Proprietors of Carolina. He was also York Herald. Part of his duties were to invest the Carolina provincial nobility, with the Order of the Sun of Carolina and to register the Carolina nobility.
