= William Courthope (officer of arms) =

English officer of arms, genealogist and writer

William Courthope (1808 – 13 May 1866) was an English officer of arms, genealogist and writer, Somerset Herald from 1854.

== Life ==
The son of Thomas Courthope and his wife Mary, daughter of Thomas Buxton, born 6 May 1808, he was engaged as private clerk by Francis Townsend, Rouge Dragon Pursuivant, in 1824, and entered the office of the College of Arms as clerk in 1833. He was appointed Rouge Croix Pursuivant in 1839, Somerset Herald in 1854, and registrar of the college in 1859.

Courthope was called to the bar as a member of the Inner Temple in 1851, but did not practise. He accompanied several missions sent with the insignia of the Order of the Garter to foreign sovereigns.

Courthope died at Hastings, on 13 May 1866.

== Works ==
Courthope's works were considered accurate. He published:

- An edition of John Debrett's Complete Peerage of Great Britain and Ireland, 1834, 1836.
- An edition of Debrett's Baronetage, 1835.
- Synopsis of Extinct Baronetage, 1835.
- Memoir of Daniel Chamier, minister of the Reformed Church, with notices of the Descendants, 1852, privately printed. Courthope was a descendant of Chamier.
- An edition of Nicholas Harris Nicolas' Historic Peerage of England, 1857.
- A Pictorial History of the Earls of Warwick in the Rows Role, 1859.

Courthope also contributed to Collectanea Topographica et Genealogica and to the Gentleman's Magazine.

== Family ==
In 1838 Courthope married Frances Elizabeth, daughter of the Rev. Frederic Gardiner, rector of Llanvetherine, Monmouthshire. He died without issue.

== Arms ==
Coat of arms of William Courthope
Crest (1) A demi-stag salient gules semy of estoiles & attired or. (2) A cubit arm erect proper holding an anchor azure, fluke & ring gold. Escutcheon Argent, a fess azure between 3 estoiles sable a molet or for difference. Motto Court Hope (over 2nd crest). My hope is not broken (below shield).

== Notes ==
Attribution

This article incorporates text from a publication now in the public domain: Stephen, Leslie, ed. (1887). "Courthope, William". Dictionary of National Biography. Vol. 12. London: Smith, Elder & Co.
