= Henry Dethick =

English priest (1546–1613)

Henry Dethick (1546–1613) was an English priest.

The son of Gilbert Dethick, Garter Principal King of Arms from 1550 until 1584, he was educated at the University of Oxford. He was a Master in chancery; Rector of Salkeld; and Archdeacon of Carlisle from 1588 to 1597. He was Master of Greatham Hospital from 1594 until 1610

Dethick is listed as co-author of The Gardener's Labyrinth published in 1577.
