= Lawrence Dalton =

Lawrence Dalton (died 13 December 1561) was an officer of arms at the College of Arms in London. Dalton was one of thirteen children of Roger Dalton of Bispham, Lancashire, and his fourth wife. Lawrence Dalton also had two half-brothers and one half-sister from his father's first marriage. Little is known about Dalton's early life, and he is not known to have attended a university.

== Heraldic career ==
On 15 November 1546, Dalton was appointed Rouge Croix Pursuivant of Arms in Ordinary at the College of Arms. This appointment came while Sir Christopher Barker was Garter Principal King of Arms. Barker was an important connection, being the husband of Dalton's aunt. Dalton was promoted to Richmond Herald of Arms in Ordinary on 12 April 1547. In 1549, Dalton was involved in a scheme to embezzle from the Great Wardrobe of the Royal Household. In August 1553, Dalton accompanied Norroy King of Arms in attending upon the army in Scotland. He later received a royal pardon for all of his embezzlement offenses and all consequent actions and bills against him in any court.

Dalton was created Norroy King of Arms on 6 September 1557, and in February 1558 Dalton and Rouge Dragon Pursuivant went north to attend the Earl of Westmorland on an expedition against the Scottish army. They remained at Newcastle and Berwick recording pedigrees and arms of prominent men in the north, though these pedigrees have never been counted at the College of Arms as an official visitation.

In November 1560, the other heralds accused Dalton of having syphilis and suggested that as a sick man he should only receive half of the fees to which he was entitled. He would not answer their charges and they refused to eat or drink with him and deprived him of any pay. He was reinstated by the Earl Marshal in early 1561 on the advice of two physicians. In 1560 and 1561 he made over forty grants of arms, more than half of them to established families in Lancashire, his county of origin.

Dalton's death was sudden. He granted a crest to Adam Hulton on 10 December 1561 and drew up his will on the 12th. He died early the next day. He was buried on 15 December at St Dunstan-in-the-West, London. Though his memorial brass does not survive, sketches of it do that show him wearing a tabard and crown. His wife, Dorothy, was the executor and sole beneficiary of his will, which was proved on 26 January 1562. Neither his will nor hers mention any children.

== Arms ==
Coat of arms of Lawrence Dalton
Crest A dragon's head vert purfled & winged or. Escutcheon Quarterly, (1 & 4) azure crusuly, a lion rampant gardant argent (Dalton); (2 & 3) argent, 3 bars azure with 3 voided lozenges gules in chief (Fleming). Motto Il Sera Come Dieu Plaira

== See also ==
- Heraldry
