= Henry Chitting =

British officer of arms (1580–1638)

Henry Chitting (1580 – 7 January 1638) was a long-serving officer of arms at the College of Arms in London.

== Life ==
His heraldic career was started thanks to his family's ties to Sir Nicholas Bacon. On 18 July 1618, Chitting was appointed Chester Herald of Arms in Ordinary after purchasing the position from his predecessor. In this capacity he visited Berkshire and Gloucestershire in 1623 for William Camden, Clarenceux King of Arms.

He died on 7 January 1637-8, at Islington.

== Family ==
Chitting first married a widow whom he outlived and about whom little is known. Some time after 1612 he married Ann, the daughter of William Bennet. She died on 8 May 1630 at the age of 27. The two had three children. After her death, he then married Susan, daughter of John Darnall of Hertingfordbury, Hertfordshire, who survived him. Chitting was admitted to Gray's Inn on 4 August 1633, and this was presumably a result of his links with the Bacon family. He died on 7 January 1638 and was buried at Islington. For the occasion, fifty copies of his funeral sermon were printed, which was written by Edward Sparke, later the author of Scintilla Altaris.

== See also ==
- Herald
- Heraldry

== Bibliography ==
- W. H. Rylands, The Four Visitations of Berkshire. Harleian Society (1908), 56–57.
- Walter H. Godfrey and Sir Anthony Wagner, The College of Arms, Queen Victoria Street: being the sixteenth and final monograph of the London Survey Committee. (London, 1963),
- B. Carter, "Catholic Charitable Endeavour in London, 1810–1840". Recusant History, 25 (2000–01), 487–510, 648–69.
- L. Campbell and Francis Steer. A Catalogue of Manuscripts in the College of Arms Collections. (London, 1988).
