= Rouge Croix Pursuivant =

Officer of the College of Arms

- The heraldic badge of Rouge Croix Pursuivant of Arms in Ordinary
- Heraldic tradition: Gallo-British
- Jurisdiction: England, Wales and Northern Ireland
- Governing body: College of Arms

Rouge Croix Pursuivant of Arms in Ordinary is a junior officer of arms of the College of Arms. He is said to be the oldest of the four pursuivants in ordinary. The office is named after St George's Cross which has been a symbol of England since the time of the Crusades.

The current Rouge Croix Pursuivant of Arms in Ordinary is Thomas Johnston. He took part in the Royal Procession at the 2023 Coronation.

== Holders of the office ==
Arms	Name	Date of appointment	Ref
	Nicholas Serby	(Henry IV)	
	Richard Boys	(Henry IV)	
	Giles Waster	(Henry V)	
	Roger Legh or Lygh	(Henry V)	
	John Writhe	(Henry V)	
	John Mowbray	(1422)	
	Robert Ashwell	(Henry VI)	
	James Billett	(Henry VI)	
	John Mallett	(Henry VI)	
	Robert Dunham	(Henry VI)	
	Richard Ashwell	(Henry VI)	
	John Ballard	(Henry VI)	
	Thomas Holme	(Henry VI)	
	John More	(Henry VI)	
	William Carlill	(Edward IV)	
	Roger Stamford	(Edward IV)	
	Richard Slacke	(Edward IV)	
	John Water or Walter	(Edward IV)	
	Thomas Benolt	(Edward IV)	
	Thomas Waters	(Edward IV)	
	Robert Browne	(Edward IV)	
	William Jenyns	(Edward IV)	
	Thomas Tonge	(Edward IV)	
	George Berry	(1484)	
	Richard Greenwood	(1485)	
	(name unknown)	(1492)	
	William Wriothesley	1505–1509	
	Thomas Hawley	1509–1515	
	Laurence de la Gatta	1515–1520	
	Thomas Wall	1521–1521	
	Charles Wriothesley	1524–1535	
	Bartholomew Butler	1535–1538	
	Thomas Stevenson	1538–1540	
	Gilbert Dethick	1540–1541	
	Justinian Barker	1541–1543	
	William Flower	1543–1546	
	Lawrence Dalton	1546–1547	
	Simon Newbald	(Edward VI)	
	Nicholas Tubman	1551–1553	
	Henry Cotgrove	1553–1566	
	William Dethick	1566–1569	
	Thomas Dawes	1569–1580	
	Ralph Brooke	1580–1592	
	Thomas Knight	1592–1604	
	William Wyrley	1604–1619	
	John Guillim	1619–1621	
	Augustine Vincent	1621–1624	
	John Bradshaw	1624–1626	
	George Owen	1626–1637	
	Edward Walker	1637–1638	
	Henry Lilly	1638–1639	
	William Dugdale	1639–?	
	Robert Browne	(intruded)	
	Everard Exton	(intruded)	
	Henry Dethick	1660–1677	
	Henry Ball	1677–1686	
	Charles Mawson	1686–1688	
	Samuel Stebbing	1688–?	
	Peter Le Neve	(Anne)	
	John Bound	(Anne)	
	Richard Graham	1722–1725	
	Richard Pomfret	1725–1751	
	Alexander Cozens	1751–1752	
	Henry Hastings	1752?–1773	
	John Charles Brooke	1773–1777	
	Francis Townsend	1777–1784	
	John Atkinson	1784–1794	
	Joseph Hawker	1794–1803	
	William Radclyffe	1803–1823	
	Robert Laurie	1823–1839	
	William Courthope	1839–1854	
	James Planché	1854–1866	
	John de Havilland	1866–1872	
	Stephen Tucker	1872–1880	
	Sir Henry Farnham Burke	1880–1887	
	George William Marshall	1887–1904	
	Sir Arthur Cochrane	1904–1915	
	Archibald Russell	1915–1922	
	Henry Robert Charles Martin	1922–1928	
	Philip Walter Kerr	1928–1941	
	John Walker	1947–1954	
	Sir Walter Verco	1954–1960	
	Rodney Dennys	1961–1967	
	(David) Hubert Chesshyre	1970–1978	
	Sir Thomas Woodcock	1978–1982	
	Sir Henry Paston-Bedingfeld, 10th Baronet	1983–1993	
	David White	1995–2004	
	John Allen-Petrie	2013–2019	
	Thomas Andrew Johnston, Esq.	2023–present	

== See also ==
- Heraldry
- Officer of Arms
