= Gilbert Dethick =

British officer of arms (c.1510–1584)

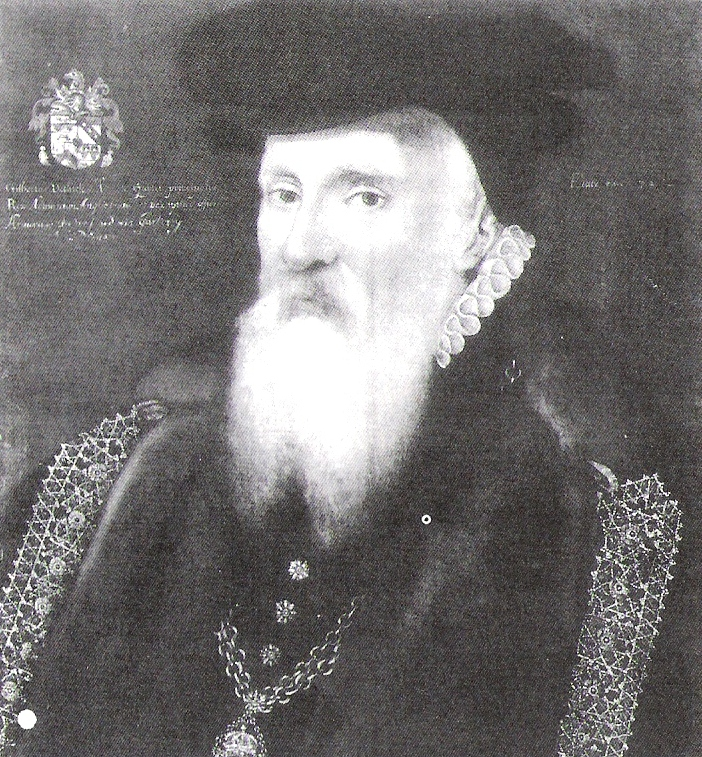
Sir Gilbert Dethick in 1574

Sir Gilbert Dethick FSA (c. 1510 – 3 October 1584) was a long-serving English officer of arms at the College of Arms in London. He would eventually rise to the highest heraldic office in England and serve as Garter Principal King of Arms.

== Family origins ==
Gilbert Dethick claimed descent from a family originally seated at Dethick Hall in Derbyshire. However, Ralph Brooke, York Herald of Arms in Ordinary, claimed his progenitor was one Robert Dericke, a Dutchman who came to England with Erasmus Crukenez, yeoman armourer to Henry VIII. Robert married Agatha, daughter of Matthias Leydendecker, a Dutch barber from Acon, near the Dutch border with Germany, who also became an armourer to Henry VIII.

This Robert and Agatha had three sons: Dericke, Matthias and Gilbert. Gilbert later procured denization from Parliament for himself and his brothers. This alone casts doubt upon the later claim of a Derbyshire origin. All three brothers prospered in England.

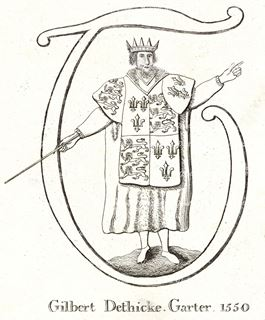
Gilbert Dethick Garter 1550

== Personal details ==
Gilbert Dethick first married Alice, daughter of Leonard Peterson, a Dutchman, but Alice died on 13 January 1572. Dethick then married Jane, daughter of Richard Duncomb of Moreton, Buckinghamshire and widow of William Naylor, one of the six clerks in chancery. In his first marriage, Dethick had three sons: Nicholas Dethick, who would become Windsor Herald of Arms in Ordinary; Sir William Dethick, who would become Garter Principal King of Arms like his father, and Henry Dethick, Chancellor of the Diocese of Carlisle. In his second marriage, Dethick had one son, Robert, and a daughter, Mary.

For notes on William Flower, Norroy king-of-arms, and Robert Glover, Portcullis, see the introduction by F. R. Raines to the 1567 Visitation of Lancaster, pub. 1870 by the Chetham Society, v.81. Like Sir Gilbert, Flower and Glover came from merchant and yeoman families. In the Middle Ages they would have been clerks in the household of a monarch or great nobleman, or in the church. These heralds were publicly honoured, if not well remunerated, for careful scholarship. This is another indication that the upper classes in Tudor and Stuart England were more accepting of "new men" than their continental counterparts.

== Heraldic career ==
Dethick entered the College of Arms at the age of sixteen and was created Hampnes Pursuivant of Arms Extraordinary on 16 June 1536 at Hampton Court. The office was named for Hampnes, now Hames, a castle and village near Calais. He was appointed Rouge Croix Pursuivant of Arms in Ordinary in December 1540, and was advanced to the office of Richmond Herald of Arms in Ordinary later in that same month. At the death of William Fellow, Norroy King of Arms, in December 1546, Dethick was nominated to succeed him, but it was not until the reign of Edward VI, on 16 August 1547, that his appointment was confirmed by letters patent. On 14 April 1549 Dethick was granted a knighthood. At the death of Sir Christopher Barker, Dethick was promoted to Garter Principal King of Arms on 20 April 1550.

Dethick served his monarch in many capacities. It is presumed that he was an excellent linguist. He was sent on several missions to the Danish court to reclaim ships and was also sent to John III, Duke of Cleves to negotiate the marriage of his daughter, Anne, with Henry VIII. He was also sent to represent Henry at the Diet of Ratisbon. He was rewarded by Henry VIII with a mansion and acre of land at Poplar, in the parish of Stepney, where his descendants resided for almost two centuries.

In 1547 Sir Gilbert accompanied Lord Protector Somerset in his expedition against the Scots, and in 1549 he delivered a summons to surrender to rebels in Kent, Essex, Suffolk and Norfolk. He and William Flower, Chester Herald of Arms in Ordinary, accompanied William Parr, 1st Marquess of Northampton, in his 1551 mission to Paris, to invest Henry II of France with the Order of the Garter. Both officers of arms received ten shillings per day for food and lodging.

During the reigns of both Mary and Elizabeth, Dethick was sent abroad on diplomatic missions, and at home it became his duty to proclaim declarations of war and treaties of peace. As the public voice of the monarch, he may have held an exalted view of his own dignity. Sir Gilbert Dethick was "unmanageable when a herald, very unsociable, insolent and tempestuous," according to Mark Noble's History of the College of Arms, p. 186, 201.

Sir Gilbert died in London 3 October 1584, and some records infer he was buried in the Church of St Benet Paul's Wharf. However, he is listed in St Paul's Cathedral on a monument in the crypt, as one of the important graves lost in the Great Fire of London in 1666.

== Arms ==
Coat of arms of Gilbert Dethick
Notes These arms & quarterings belong to Dethick of Dethick Hall. Sir Gilbert sealed with the first coat only. The gravestone of Sir Gilbert's brother Matthew in York Minster is said to bear 3 bougets, sans fess. Crest A nag's head argent differenced as the arms. Escutcheon Quarterly, (1 & 4) argent, a fess vairy gules & or between 3 bougets sable, with a mullet on a crescent for difference (Dethick); (2) argent, a chief gules & on a bend over all azure 3 escutcheon argent each charged with a chief gules (Allestree); (3) or, a bend gules & a canton argent goutty sable. Motto Mors Aut Victoria Laeta ("Death or A Sweet Victory")

== See also ==
- Pursuivant
- Herald
- King of Arms
