= George Owen (herald) =

Welsh officer of arms

George Owen (died 1665) was a Welsh officer of arms, York herald from 1633.

== Life ==
The son of George Owen of Henllys, by his second wife, he was conceived out of wedlock, and born at Henllys in Pembrokeshire. He was appointed Rouge Croix Pursuivant in place of John Bradshaw on 28 February 1626, and was promoted to the post of York herald by signet in December 1633, and by patent 3 January following.

Owen attended the Earl of Arundel in the First Bishops' War of 1639, and, according to Anthony Wood, was despatched on a mission in the king's service to Wales in following year. He was with the retinue of Charles I at Oxford in 1643, where, on 12 April, he was created D.C.L., and he subsequently accompanied the king when the royal forces moved to invest Gloucester on 10 August.

At some point after early 1645, Owen was asked to act as deputy to the Clarenceux King of Arms, William Le Neve, who had been sent abroad. Owen then went over to the parliamentary side, being confirmed as York herald. Officiating at events of the new regime, he was nominated successively as Clarenceux and Norroy King of Arms; but was on bad terms with Sir Edward Bysshe, the Garter King of Arms.

In 1660 Owen was reappointed York herald, and held the office until he resigned it in 1663, when he was succeeded by his son-in-law, John Wingfield. With Elias Ashmole, he directed the funeral in London of Bryan Walton, on 5 December 1661. He died in Pembrokeshire 13 May 1665.

== Works ==
Owen has been widely confused with his father, and with George ap Owen ap Harry, called George Owen Harry. Owen's own heraldic work includes his grant of a coat-of-arms in 1654 to Colonel Philip Jones, now preserved at Fonmon Castle, Glamorganshire, and the illuminated "Golden Grove Pedigree Parchment Roll", dated 1641, of the pedigree of the Vaughans, Earls of Carbery.

== Family ==
Owen married Rebecca, daughter of Sir Thomas Dayrell of Lillingstone Dayrell, Buckinghamshire, by whom he had two sons, who both died without issue, and a daughter, who was married to his successor, John Wingfield.

== Arms ==
Coat of arms of George Owen
Escutcheon Gules, a boar argent, armed, bristled, collared & chained or chained to a holly bush proper on a mount vert.

== Notes ==
Attribution

This article incorporates text from a publication now in the public domain: Lee, Sidney, ed. (1895). "Owen, George (d.1665)". Dictionary of National Biography. Vol. 42. London: Smith, Elder & Co.
