= William Harvey (officer of arms) =

English officer of arms

William Harvey (1510 – 1567) was an English officer of arms.

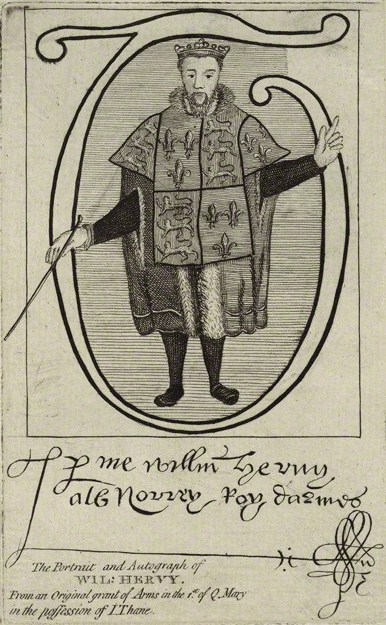
William Harvey, engraving possibly 18th century by Charles Hall

Born June 1510 to Turner and Mary Harvey in Ashill, Somerset. He had a brother Thomas Harvey of London, whose daughter Audrey Harvey married William Jefferay. According to the Dictionary of National Biography William Harvey became a junior officer of the college of arms and was appointed the Bluemantle Pursuivant in ordinary on 18 June 1536. Under this title he accompanied William Paget on an embassy visit to France. After this he was awarded the Somerset Herald coat of arms. Under this title he was recorded as being the only officer of arms to attend the funeral of Catherine Queen dowager of King Henry VIII.

In 1549 he was appointed the Norroy King of arms by Edward VI. During this time he made an official visit to Germany. Most strikingly he was despatched to France on 7 June 1557 to declare war on behalf of Queen Mary. From 1557 until his death he was Clarenceux King of Arms.

Harvey died in Thame, Oxfordshire, in 1567.

Harvey is a central character in James Forrester's 2011 novel Sacred Treason.

== Arms ==
Coat of arms of William Harvey
Escutcheon Or, a chevron between 3 leopard faces gules.
