= Thomas Benolt =

- Died: 8 May 1534; London, England
- Resting place: St Helen, Bishopsgate, London, England, UK
- Occupations: Antiquarian; Diplomat; Genealogist

Thomas Benolt (died 8 May 1534) was a long-serving officer of arms at the College of Arms in London. As part of his service, he was also a diplomat. He appears to have been born at Rouen, though his family had stronger links with Calais. Benolt is thought to have been raised in that city, and his brother at one time became its secretary. Thomas Benolt is reported to have served Kings Edward IV and Richard III as a pursuivant, but these claims cannot be substantiated. The first definitive evidence of his royal service is an appointment as Windsor Herald of Arms in Ordinary on 6 May 1504. Six years later, he was promoted to the post of Norroy King of Arms and on 30 January 1511 he was made Clarenceux King of Arms.

== Diplomatic career ==
Having been born and raised in France, Benolt was an obvious choice for foreign employment. He was chosen for a mission to France in 1505 and he later went with the Earl of Surrey to prepare for the Scottish invasion in the autumn of 1512. After this, he was almost always sent to work abroad. He was in France in 1514, 1515, every year from 1518 to 1522, and again in 1524, 1529, and 1533. He was sent to Scotland in 1516, 1517, and every year from 1519 to 1526. He also spent years in Germany and Spain. Towards the end of his life he wrote, "It was the pleasure of the king my master to send me often beyond the sea, whereas I was as much without the realm as within."

Benolt's duties for the royal household were varied. At one point, he was required to purchase wine for Cardinal Wolsey. In his service he was also given orders to defy Charles V at Burgos in 1528. Benolt was a trusted royal servant, and was one of only two heralds who were used for very important missions. The other was his predecessor as Clarenceux, Roger Machado. Henry VIII showed his favour to Benolt through many lucrative appointments. He was also on the pension list of the King of France following the peace of 1514, and was given a gold chain by the Holy Roman Emperor.

== Heraldic duties ==
Benolt participated in many ceremonies in England when he was there. These were part of his duties as an officer of arms and ranged from the funeral of Henry VII in 1509 to the coronation of Anne Boleyn in 1533. When he was made Clarenceux he delegated most of his armorial functions to Thomas Wriothesley, Garter Principal King of Arms. In 1530, though, as he was not sent abroad, he tried to get these powers back. Wriothesley refused, and a controversy began which threatened the future of the College of Arms. Benolt swayed the king in his favour in the end and gained a commission to hold heraldic visitations.

== Personal life ==
Benolt was married twice. His first wife was Margaret, with whom he had no children. His second wife was Mary Fermor, daughter of Lawrence Fermor and Elizabeth Wenman of Minster Lovell, Oxfordshire, with whom he had one son, who died young, and two daughters. He owned a house in London within the priory of St Helen, Bishopsgate, and also one in Middlesex.

Benolt was noted as absent and sick from College of Arms functions at Easter in 1534 and he died on 8 May. He was buried in St Helen, Bishopsgate. Benolt's widow later married Richard Buckland.

== Arms ==
Coat of arms of Thomas Benolt
Crest A griffin's head & wings ermine. Escutcheon Argent, a chevron engrailed sable between 3 roundels gules & on a chief azure a lion passant guardant between 2 crosses formy fitchy or. Motto Servir Previous versions On his brass in Great St Helen's this coat, but without the crosslets: Quarters 2 & 3. Quarterly, (i & iv) argent, 3 bars wavy sable, on a chief gules 3 larks or; (ii & iii) argent, a bend between 2 martlets gules.

== See also ==
- Heraldry
- Officer of arms
