= George William Marshall =

George William Marshall, LL.D., FSA (1839–1905) was an English officer of arms, serving as Rouge Dragon Pursuivant from 1887 to 1904, and as York Herald from 1904 to 1905.

He served as High Sheriff of Herefordshire for 1902, and was the same year appointed a deputy lieutenant of Herefordshire.

He published Collections for a Genealogical Account of the Family of Comberbach in 1866. This was the first Comberbach surname study.

He compiled The Genealogist's Guide (first edition 1879; revised and extended editions 1885, 1893 and 1903), a directory of published genealogies, which remains a standard work of reference.

== Works ==
- Marshall, George W. (1903). The Genealogist's Guide. Guildford: Billing and Sons.

Heraldic offices
Preceded by Sir Alfred Scott-Gatty	Rouge Dragon Pursuivant; 1887–1904	Succeeded by Gordon de Lisle Lee
Preceded by Sir Henry Burke	York Herald; 1904–1905	Succeeded by Sir Arthur Cochrane
Honorary titles
Preceded by James Louis Alexander Hope	High Sheriff of Herefordshire; 1902	Succeeded by Sir Joseph Verdin
