= George Drewry Squibb =

English lawyer, herald and antiquary

George Drewry Squibb LVO QC JP FSA FRHistS

Personal details
- Born: 1 December 1906 Chester, Cheshire, England
- Died: 3 January 1994 (aged 87) Dorchester, Dorset, England

George Drewry Squibb (1 December 1906 – 3 January 1994) was an English lawyer, herald and antiquary who is most noted for his participation in the celebrated 1954 case of Manchester Corporation v Manchester Palace of Varieties Ltd [1955] in the High Court of Chivalry, the first (and to date only) case heard by that court for over two hundred years.

In his opening arguments in that case, Squibb, who was simultaneously a distinguished barrister and a historian, argued, to the satisfaction of the court, that since the modern class of Doctors of Laws were no longer trained as advocates, their role must necessarily be performed by barristers. This was because Victorian reforms, which had unified the other classes of court attorney into the single profession of Barrister, had overlooked the Doctors of Law.

== Birth, family and education ==
He was born in Chester on 1 December 1906, the eldest son of Reginald Augustus Hodder Squibb, from a Dorset family. He was related to Arthur Squibb, who was Clarenceux King of Arms at the College of Arms 1646-1650 (in the time of Cromwell).

He was educated at the King's School, Chester, and the Queen's College, Oxford, where he took his first degree and also a Bachelor of Civil Law.

== Legal career ==
He was called to the Bar by the Inner Temple in 1930, and practised as a barrister for the rest of his life. His London home was a flat in the Temple, in Paper Buildings, next to the Inner Temple Gardens, although his main home was in Dorset. He was elected as a Master of the Bench (bencher) by the Inner Temple in 1951; became Reader in 1975, and served as Treasurer (the senior Bencher) in 1976.

Upon being called to the Bar, he joined the chambers of RM Montgomery KC where he was a pupil of Malcolm Trustram Eve (later Lord Silsoe). He practised from these chambers for the rest of his career, eventually becoming the Head of Chambers.

He specialised in real property, rating and valuation, and planning work. He was appointed Queen's Counsel in 1956 and in silk specialized in local government work at the Parliamentary Bar.

He was appointed a Justice of the Peace for Dorset in 1943, and served as Deputy Chairman of the Dorset Quarter Sessions 1950–53, and as Chairman 1953–71. He was President of the Transport Tribunal 1962–81. He was Chief Commons Commissioner, 1971–85.

== Heraldry and history ==
Squibb was interested in genealogy and heraldry from his youth, and throughout his life he combined his professional practice with scholarly research and publication on historical topics linked to his interests. He wrote the definitive modern study of The Law of Arms in England (1953), and other monographs including Reports of Heraldic Cases in the Court of Chivalry (1956); The High Court of Chivalry (1959); Visitation Pedigrees and the Genealogist (1964, 2nd edn 1978); Founders’ Kin (1972); Doctors’ Commons (1977); and Precedence in England and Wales (1981). He also edited a number of volumes for the Harleian Society, including Munimenta Heraldica (1985), an anthology of constitutional documents relating to the College of Arms, the Earl Marshal, and the officers of arms.

He was Junior Counsel to the Crown in Peerage and Baronetcy Cases, 1954–56, but this ceased upon his appointment to silk. He was appointed Honorary Historical Adviser in Peerage Cases to the Attorney-General in 1965.

His work among the records of the College of Arms made him liked and respected by the Officers of Arms, and particularly by Anthony Wagner, who valued his combination of legal and historical research skills, and who wrote a Foreword to The Law of Arms in England. In 1959 he was appointed Norfolk Herald Extraordinary, and in 1976 he became the Earl Marshal's Lieutenant, Assessor and Surrogate in the Court of Chivalry.

He was elected a Fellow of the Society of Antiquaries in 1946; a Fellow of the Society of Genealogists in 1973; and a Fellow of the Royal Historical Society in 1978.

He was a member of the Worshipful Company of Scriveners, and served as Master 1979–80.

He was appointed Lieutenant of the Royal Victorian Order (LVO), an honour in the personal gift of the Queen, in 1982.

== Personal life ==
In 1936 he married Bessie Whittaker, who died in 1954. With her, he had one daughter. In 1955, he married Evelyn Higgins, who died in 1992.

He died in Dorchester on 3 January 1994.

== See also ==
- Obituary: George Squibb, The Independent 12 January 1994.
