= Ralph Brooke =

English officer of arms (1553–1625)

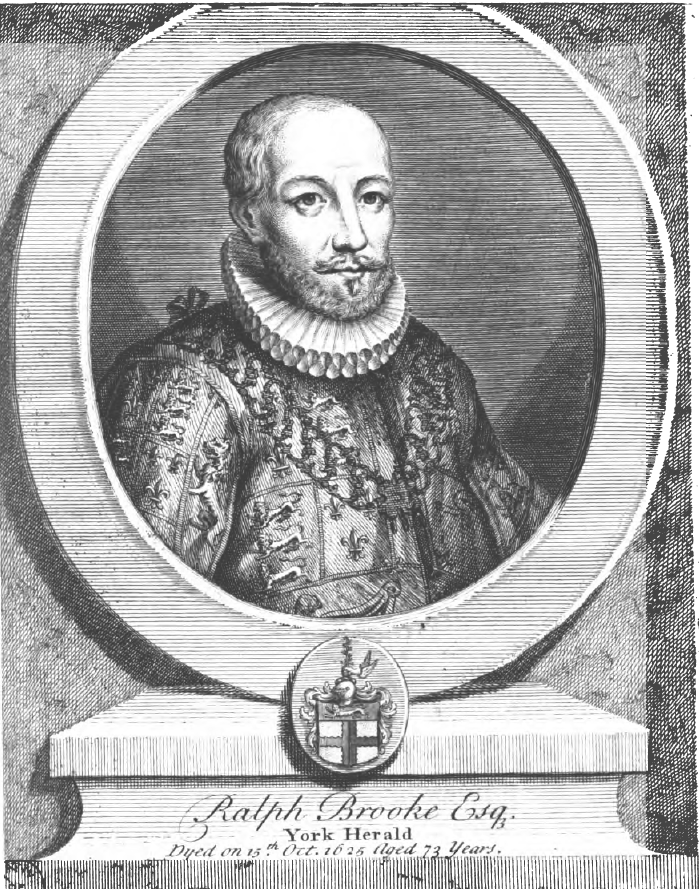
Ralph Brooke, York Herald, frontispiece to the 1723 edition of A Discoverie of Certaine Errours Published in Print in the Much Commended 'Britannia' 1594

Arms of Ralph Brooke, granted 1593: Or, a cross engrailed per pale gules & sable, on a chief gules a lion passant guardant or; as Rouge Croix he bore: Gules, on a bend argent a cross throughout gules; crest: On a torse or & sable a hand fessways joined to an open wing argent & holding a sword erect proper entwined with a spray of leaves vert

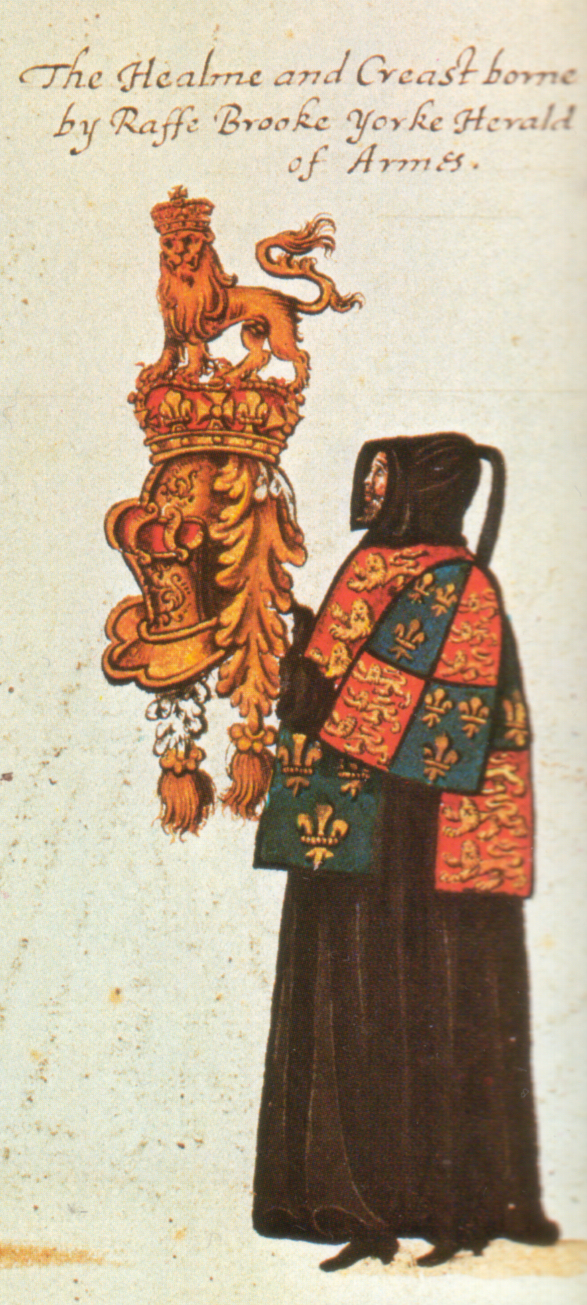
Ralph Brooke in the funeral procession of Elizabeth I.

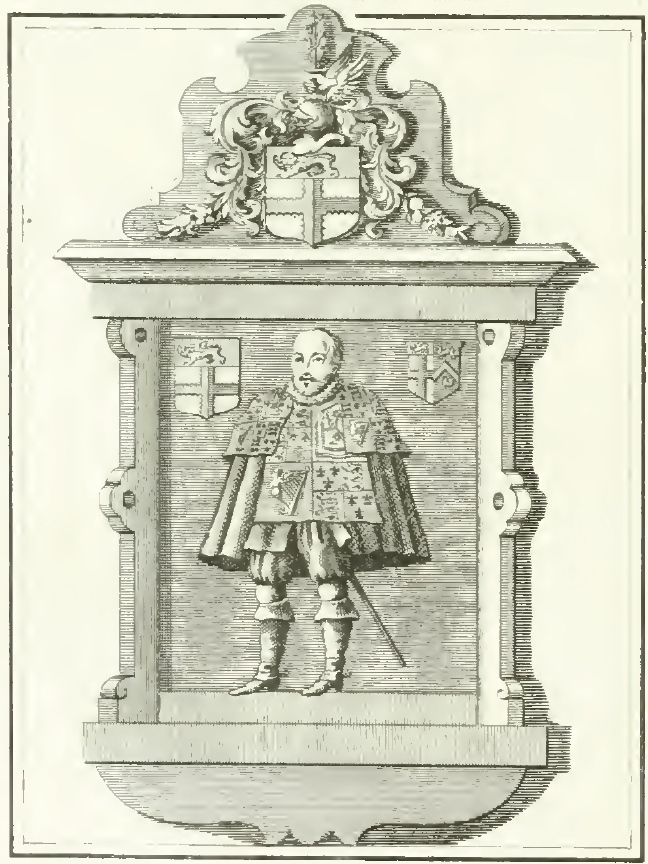
1784 engraving of mural monument to Ralph Brooke in the chancel of St Mary's Church, Reculver; destroyed when the church was rebuilt

Ralph Brooke (1553–1625) was an English Officer of Arms in the reigns of Elizabeth I and James I. He is known for his critiques of the work of other members of the College of Arms, most particularly in A Discoverie of Certaine Errours Published in Print in the Much Commended 'Britannia' 1594, which touched off a feud with its author, the revered antiquarian and herald William Camden.

== Origins ==
He described himself as the son of Geoffrey Brooke (by his wife Jane Hyde) a son of William Brooke of Lancashire, who was a cadet of the family of Brooke seated at Norton in Cheshire. However the records of the Merchant Taylors' School, where he was admitted on 3 July 1564, simply records the fact that his father was Geoffrey, a shoemaker.

== Life and works ==
He was appointed Rouge Croix Pursuivant in 1580 and York Herald in 1593. As York Herald, he bore the helm and crest in the funeral procession of Elizabeth I.

In 1597, Brooke published A Discoverie of Certaine Errours Published in Print in the Much Commended 'Britannia' 1594, which occasioned a bitter controversy with Britannia's author, the antiquarian William Camden.

Brooke also challenged the work of other heralds; in 1602 he prepared charges against Sir William Dethick, Garter King of Arms 1586–1606, and Camden for improperly granting arms to 23 "mean" men, including John Shakespeare of Stratford-upon-Avon, the father of playwright William Shakespeare. He complained in 1614 that Robert Cooke, Clarenceux King of Arms 1566–1593, had granted more than 500 new coats of arms and that Sir Gilbert Dethick, (Garter 1550–1584), and his son Sir William had exceeded these numbers. Such bitter infighting among the heralds was common; Sir William Segar (Garter 1606–1633) also objected that Cooke made numberless grants to "base and unworthy persons for his private gaine onely."

In December 1616 Brooke tricked Segar into confirming foreign royal arms to Gregory Brandon, a common hangman of London who was masquerading as a gentleman. Brooke then reported Segar to James I, who imprisoned both Brooke and Segar in Marshalsea. They were released a few days later and the Lord Chamberlain hoped that the experience would make Brooke more honest and Segar more wise.

Brooke's Catalogue and Succession of the Kings, Princes, Dukes, Marquesses, Earles and Viscounts of this Realme of England since the Norman Conquest was published in 1619. A revised edition of the Discoverie "...to which is added, the learned Mr. Camden's answer to this book, and Mr. Brooke's reply" was issued in 1622, as was an expanded edition of the Catalogue and Succession..., as Catalogue and Succession of the Kings, Princes, Dukes, Marquesses, Earles and Viscounts of this Realme of England since the Norman Conquest, to this present year 1622.

Brooke died on 16 October 1625 and was buried inside St Mary's Church, Reculver, where he was commemorated by a black marble tablet on the south wall of the chancel, showing him dressed in his herald's tabard.

== Notes ==
Heraldic offices
Preceded by Thomas Dawes	Rouge Croix Pursuivant of Arms; 1580–1592	Succeeded by Thomas Knight
Preceded by Humphry Hales	York Herald of Arms; 1593–1625	Succeeded by William Le Neve
