= York Herald =

Officer of the College of Arms

- The heraldic badge of York Herald of Arms in Ordinary
- Heraldic tradition: Gallo–British
- Jurisdiction: England, Wales and Northern Ireland
- Governing body: College of Arms

York Herald of Arms in Ordinary is an officer of arms at the College of Arms. The first York Herald is believed to have been an officer to Edmund of Langley, Duke of York around the year 1385, but the first completely reliable reference to such a herald is in February 1484, when John Water alias Yorke, herald was granted certain fees by Richard III. These fees included the Manor of Bayhall in Pembury, Kent, and 8 pounds, 6 shillings, and 8 pence a year from the Lordship of Huntingfield in Kent. The badge of office is the White Rose of York en soleil ensigned by the Royal Crown.

The current York Herald of Arms is Peter O'Donoghue.

== Holders of the office ==
Arms	Name	Date of appointment	Ref
	Henry French or Franke	(Edward IV)	
	Thomas Hollingworth	(Edward IV)	
	John Water	(1484)	
	Rowland Playnford	(Henry VII)	
	John Mynne	(Henry VII)	
	William Wriothesley or Writhe	1509–1513	
	Thomas Tonge	1513–1522	
	Ralph Lagysse	1522–1528	
	Thomas Bysley	1528–1530	
	Allan Dagnall	1530–1538	
	Bartholomew Butler	1538–1553	
	Martin Maroffe	1553–1564	
	William Colborne	1564–1567	
	Ralph Langman	1567–1570	
	William Dethick	1570–1587	
	Humphry Hales	1587–1593	
	Ralph Brooke	1593–1625	
	William Le Neve	1625–1633	
	George Owen	(1633)	
	George Owen	1660–1663	
	John Wingfield	1663–1675	
	Robert Devenish	1675–1700	
	Laurence Cromp, Esq. (Note: Concurrently held the office of Carolina Herald.)	1700–1717	
	Thomas Whitwick	1717–1722	
	Philip Jones	1722–1735	
	Charles Townley	1735–1753	
	George Fletcher	1753–1786	
	Benjamin Pingo	1786–1794	
	George Nayler	1794–1820	
	Charles Young	1820–1842	
	Edward Howard-Gibbons	1842–1848	
	Thomas King	1848–1872	
	John de Havilland	1872–1886	
	Sir Alfred Scott-Gatty	1886–1904	
	George William Marshall	1904–1905	
	Gordon Lee	1905–1922	
	Philip Cary	1923–1932	
	Aubrey Toppin	1932–1957	
	Charles Murray Kennedy St Clair, 17th Lord Sinclair	1957–1968	
	Sir Conrad Swan	1968–1992	
	Peter Spurrier	1992–1993	
	Sir Henry Paston-Bedingfeld, 10th Baronet	1993–2010	
	Peter O'Donoghue	2012–present	

== See also ==
- Heraldry
- Officer of Arms
