= Somerset Herald =

Officer of the College of Arms

- The heraldic badge of Somerset Herald of Arms in Ordinary
- Heraldic tradition: Gallo–British
- Jurisdiction: England, Wales and Northern Ireland
- Governing body: College of Arms

Somerset Herald of Arms in Ordinary is an officer of arms at the College of Arms in London. In the year 1448 Somerset Herald is known to have served Edmund Beaufort, 1st Duke of Somerset, but by the time of the coronation of Henry VII in 1485 his successor appears to have been raised to the rank of a royal officer, when he was the only herald to receive coronation liveries.

By 1525 Somerset was again in private service, on the staff of Henry FitzRoy, 1st Duke of Richmond and Somerset, although he was appointed by the King and shared the heralds' fees as a herald extraordinary. On the death of that nobleman in 1536 the herald returned to the service of the crown, and all later officers called Somerset have been members of the royal household as heralds in ordinary. The badge of office is A Portcullis Or Royally Crowned. This is a version of the Beaufort badge.

The current Somerset Herald of Arms is Mark Scott.

== Holders of the office ==
| Arms | Name | Date of appointment | Ref |
|---|---|---|---|
Royal Herald of Henry VII
| | John Yonge (Note: Escorted Margaret Tudor to Edinburgh, 1503.) | (1493) | |
| | John Pounde | (1511) | |
Herald to Henry FitzRoy, 1st Duke of Richmond and Somerset
| | John Pounde | (1511) | |
| | William Hastings | (1528) | |
| | Thomas Traheyron or Trahern | (1536) | |
Somerset Herald of Arms in Ordinary
| | Thomas Traheyron or Trahern (Note: Killed in Scotland, 25 November 1542.) | 1536–1542 | |
| | Richard Radcliffe | 1543–1545 | |
| | William Harvey | 1545–1551 | |
| | Edmond Atkinson | 1551–1571 | |
| | Robert Glover | 1571–1588 | |
| | William Segar | 1589–1597 | |
| | Robert Treswell | 1597–1624 | |
| | John Philipot | 1624–1645 | |
| | George Owen | 1657–1658 | |
| | Henry Bysshe | 1658–1660 | |
| | Sir Thomas St George | 1660–1680 | |
| | Francis Burghill | 1680–1700 | |
| | Samuel Stebbing | 1700–1720 | |
| | John Warburton | 1720–1759 | |
| | Ralph Bigland | 1759–1773 | |
| | Henry Hastings | 1773–1777 | |
| | John Charles Brooke | 1777–1794 | |
| | John Atkinson | 1794–1813 | |
| | James Cathrow | 1813–1854 | |
| | William Courthope | 1854–1866 | |
| | James Planché | 1866–1872 | |
| | Stephen Tucker | 1880–1887 | |
| | Sir Henry Farnham Burke | 1887–1911 | |
| | Everard Green | 1911–1926 | |
| | Sir George Bellew | 1926–1950 | |
| | Michael Trappes-Lomax | 1951–1967 | |
| | Rodney Dennys | 1967–1982 | |
| | Thomas Woodcock | 1982–1997 | |
| | David Vines White | 2004–2021 | |
| | Mark John Rosborough Scott | 2024–present | |

== See also ==
- Heraldry
- Officer of Arms
