= St George (surname) =

St George or St. George is a surname, and may refer to:

- Adolph von La Valette-St. George (1831–1910), German zoologist and anatomist
- Arthur St George (1629–1701), Irish Member of Parliament
- Arthur St. George, Church of Ireland clergyman
- Baldwin St George (1362–1426), English politician
- Christopher St George (1812–1877), Irish Member of Parliament
- Ed St George (1910–1949), New Zealand rugby league footballer
- George St George (Carrick MP) (died 1713), Irish politician
- George St George, 1st Baron St George (c.1658–1735), Irish politician
- George St George (Athlone MP) (1682–1762), Irish politician
- Henry St George (1581–1644), English officer of arms
- Henry St George, the younger (1625–1715), English officer of arms
- Henry St George (died 1723), Irish Member of Parliament
- Henry St George (died 1763), Irish Member of Parliament
- John St George (1812–1891), British Army general
- Judith St. George (1931–2015), American author
- Katharine St. George (1894–1983), American politician
- Marie Elyse St. George (born 1929), Canadian artist and poet
- Neville St George (1897–1980), New Zealand rugby league footballer
- Oliver St George (1661–1731), Irish politician
- Sir Oliver St George, 1st Baronet (died 1695), Irish Member of Parliament
- Paul St George, multimedia artist and sculptor
- Quetton St. George (1771–1821), French Royalist military office and landowner
- Richard St George (c.1550–1635), English officer of arms
- Richard St George (died 1726), Irish Member of Parliament
- Richard St George (died 1755), Irish Member of Parliament
- Richard St George (died 1790), Irish Member of Parliament
- Sir Richard St George, 1st Baronet (died 1789), Anglo-Irish politician
- Sir Richard St George, 2nd Baronet (1765–1851), Anglo-Irish politician
- Richard St George Mansergh-St George (c. 1752–1798), British Army officer and magistrate
- St George St George, 1st Baron St George (c.1715–1775), Irish politician, grandson of George St George, 1st Baron St George
- St George Gore-St George (1722–1746), Anglo-Irish politician and 5th Baronet
- Sir St George Gore, 8th Baronet (1811–1878), sportsman
- St George St George, 1st Baron St George (c.1715–1775)
- Thomas St George (1615–1703), English officer of arms
- Thomas St George (Clogher MP), (1738–1785), Irish Member of Parliament
- Thomas R. St. George (1919–2014), American author and screenwriter
- Ursula St. George (1895–1979), American actress and collector
- Vivian De Gurr St George (1895–1979), English shoeblack
