= William Segar =

Officer of arms to Elizabeth I of England

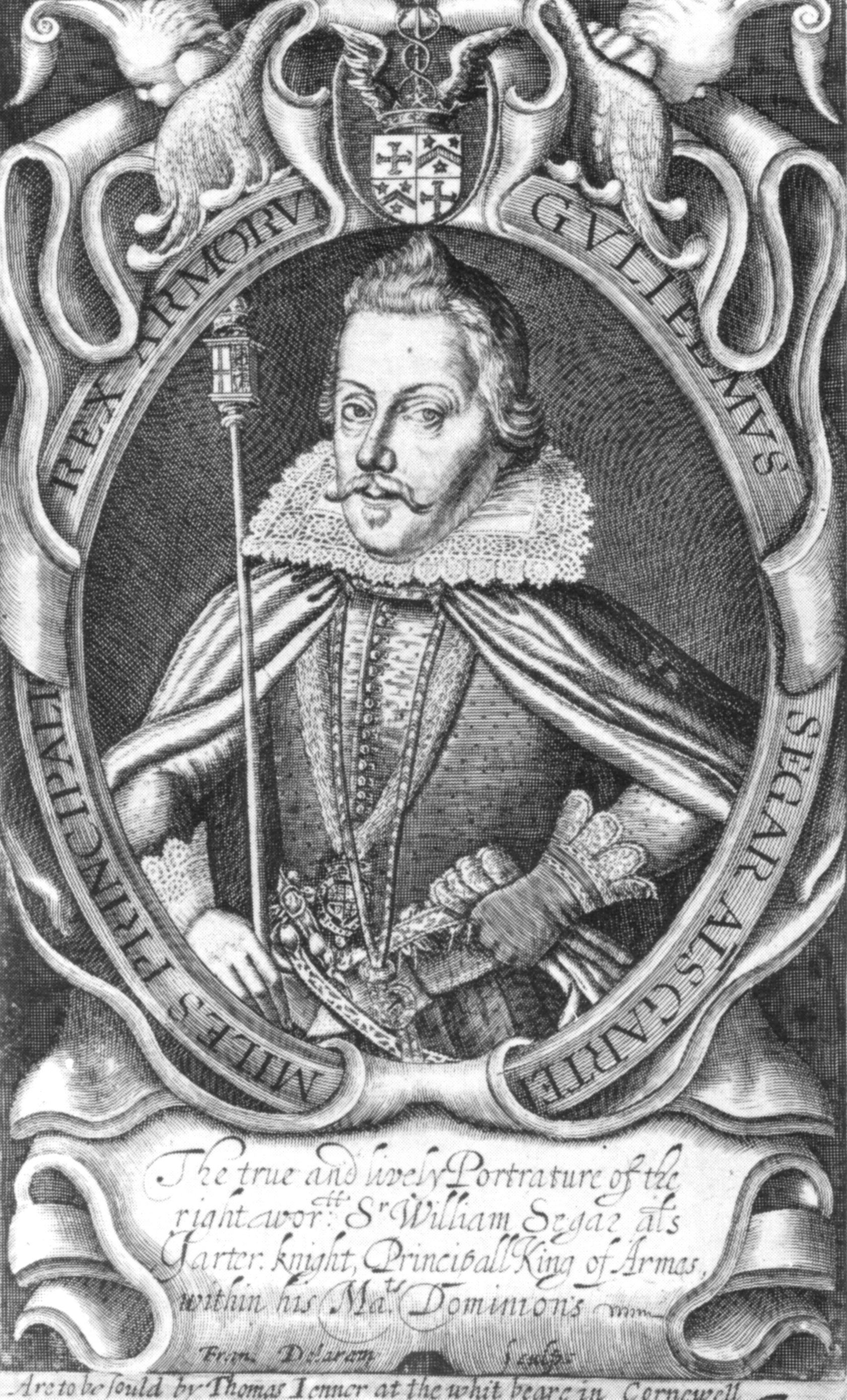
William Segar, Garter Principal King of Arms, early 17th century

Sir William Segar (c. 1554–1633) was a portrait painter and officer of arms to the court of Elizabeth I of England; he became Garter King of Arms under James I.

Like other artists of the Tudor court, Segar was active in more than one medium, painting portraits of luminaries of the court in addition to his duties in the College of Arms. He painted Elizabeth's favourite the Earl of Essex in his "Sable sad" (black) armour for the Accession Day tilt of 1590. The famous "Ermine Portrait" of Elizabeth is sometimes attributed to Segar.

== Personal life ==
William Segar may have been the son of one Nicholas Segar or of Francis Nycholson, alias Seager, who became a freeman of the Stationers' Company in 1557 and was of an old Devonshire family. Once thought to be of Dutch origin, Segar is now believed to have been born in England of an English mother. Segar stated his age as "fifty or thereabouts" in a document dated 13 September 1604. By 1584 William had married Helen Somers, and had three sons and three daughters. By 1596 Segar was married to Maria Browne and had four sons, including Thomas Segar who later became Bluemantle Pursuivant, and three daughters. In December 1616 one of Segar's rivals, York Herald Ralph Brooke, tricked him into confirming foreign royal arms to Gregory Brandon, a common hangman of London who was masquerading as a gentleman. Brooke then reported him to James I, who imprisoned both Brooke and Segar in Marshalsea. They were released a few days later and the Lord Chamberlain hoped that the experience would make Brooke more honest and Segar more wise.

== Heraldic career ==
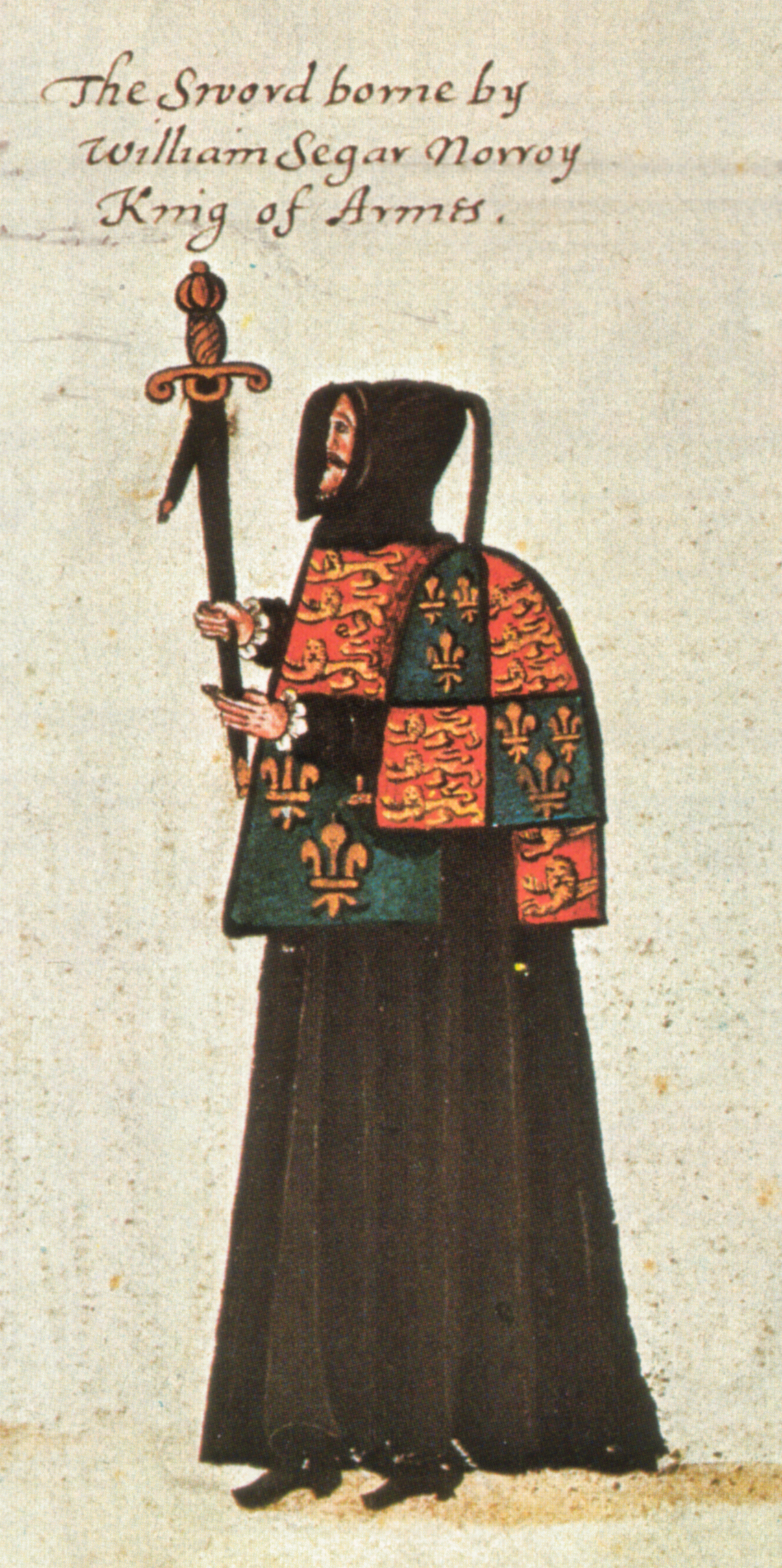
William Segar as Norroy King of Arms in the funeral procession of Elizabeth I, 1603.

Segar was trained as a scrivener and found employment with Sir Thomas Heneage, vice-chamberlain to Queen Elizabeth. Through Heneage's influence, Segar was admitted to the College of Arms in June 1585. While serving as Portcullis Pursuivant, he "reluctantly" accompanied Robert Dudley, Earl of Leicester on his 1586 expedition to the Netherlands to serve as the Master of ceremonies for the St. George's Day festivities in Utrecht. A description of this festival in John Stow's Annales is based on "the true and faithful description by one William Segar, alias Portclose [Portcullis], an officer of arms in that service."

Segar was promoted to Somerset Herald in 1589 and to Norroy King of Arms in 1593. During his tenure as Norroy, Robert Cooke, Clarenceux King of Arms, was encroaching on the traditional privileges of Garter King of Arms, Sir William Dethick. In 1595 Segar sided with Dethick, criticising Cooke for his inability to write clearly and for making many grants of arms to "base and unworthy persons for his private gaine onely."

In 1596, Segar accompanied the Earl of Shrewsbury to invest Henry IV of France with the Order of the Garter, witnessing Henry's famed Royal entry into Rouen.

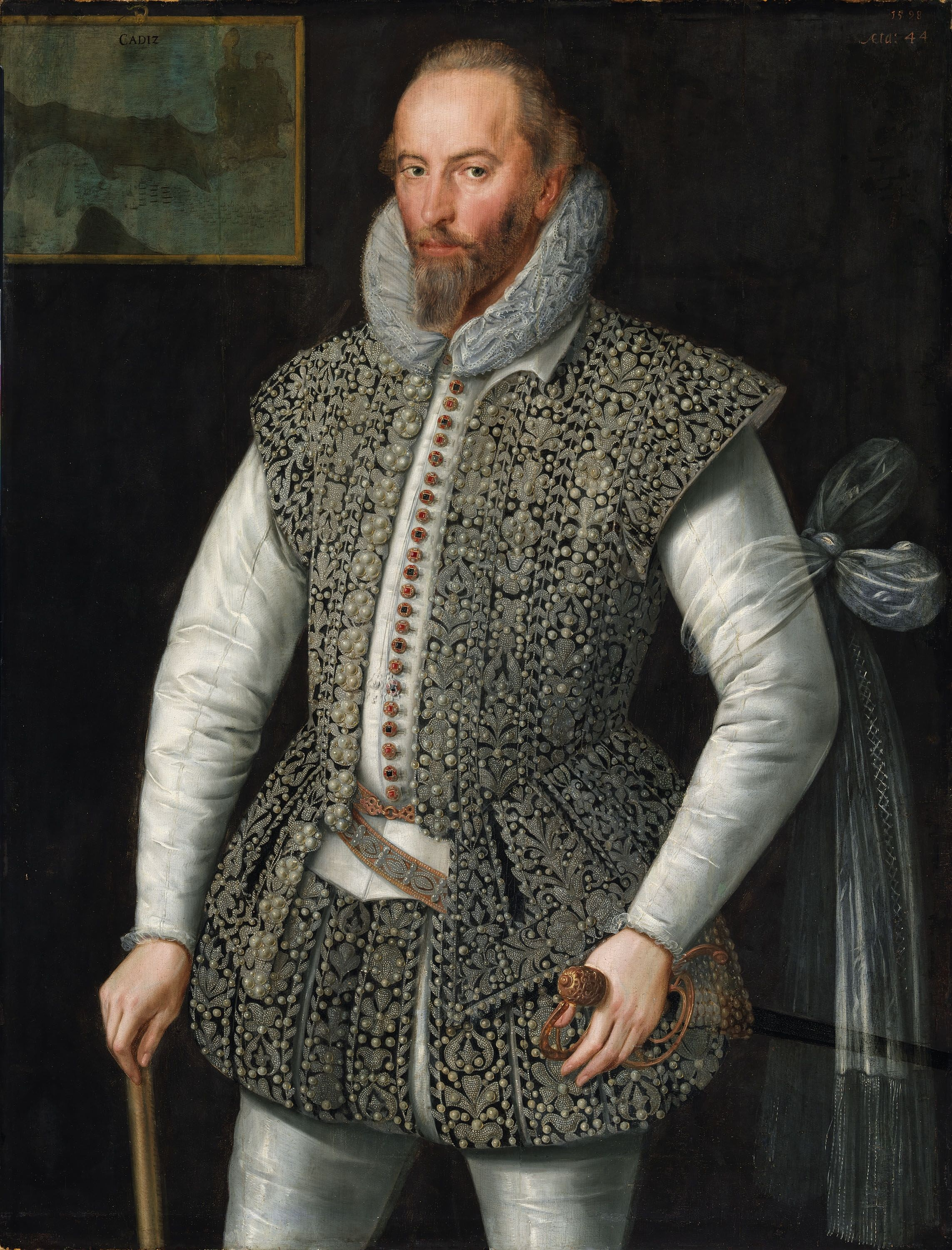
Sir Walter Raleigh, portrait by William Segar, 1598, in the National Gallery of Ireland

As Norroy, Segar carried the Sword of state in the funeral procession of Elizabeth I (1603). A contemporary manuscript shows Segar in the black gown and hood with liripipe of Tudor court mourning worn with his herald's tabard (image, left). That same year, Segar was made deputy Garter to invest Christian IV of Denmark with the Order of the Garter in place of the unpopular Dethick. He was appointed as Garter by a signet bill in January 1604, although Dethick (who now described Segar as "a poor, base, beggarly painter, and an ignorant peasant") refused to resign until December 1606. Segar obtained a great seal patent, confirming him as Garter, on 17 January 1607. In 1612 he invested Maurice, Prince of Orange, with the Garter, and the same year was granted arms. He was knighted on 5 November 1616.

Segar was the author of The Booke of Honour and Armes which was published anonymously in 1590. An expanded and illustrated version was published as Honour Military and Civil 1602; some editions had an engraved frontispiece by Francis Delaram (image, above right).

== Court painter ==
Francis Meres in his Palladia Tamia (1598) lists "William and Francis Segar brethren" among famous painters of the day. Little is known about Francis, who was residing abroad by 1605.

Segar's first documented activity is an illumination of Dean Colet in the Statute Book of St. Paul's School, for which payment is recorded in the accounts for 1585/86. The "Ermine Portrait" of Elizabeth I is dated to the same period. Segar was heavily patronised by Essex in the early 1590s, and also painted portraits of Leicester, Sir Francis Drake, and other members of the court. The last recorded payment to Segar as a painter is for a portrait of the queen in 1597.

Two sonnets by one "Ch.M." in honour of his lady Oriana were addressed to Segar, who seems to have been painting her portrait; these probably date to the 1590s.

== Jane Segar ==
William Segar had a brother Francis Segar, and a sister Jane Segar, who were also artists. Jane Segar, who sometimes spelled her surname "Seagar", made a manuscript of poems in 1589, giving it the title, The Prophecies of the Ten Sibills upon the Birth of Christ. She made covers for her manuscript from glass decorated with the verre églomisé technique.

The work was apparently intended as a gift to Elizabeth I to gain her royal patronage and further commissions. She acknowledged her debt to Timothie Bright, a contemporary writing master and inventor of a form of shorthand with an anagram. Apart from this manuscript, comparable with the works of Esther Inglis, little is known of her career. William Segar wrote that she married a Lionel Plumtree, perhaps a man connected with the Muscovy trade, and that she was in Russia in 1603.

== Portraits by William Segar ==
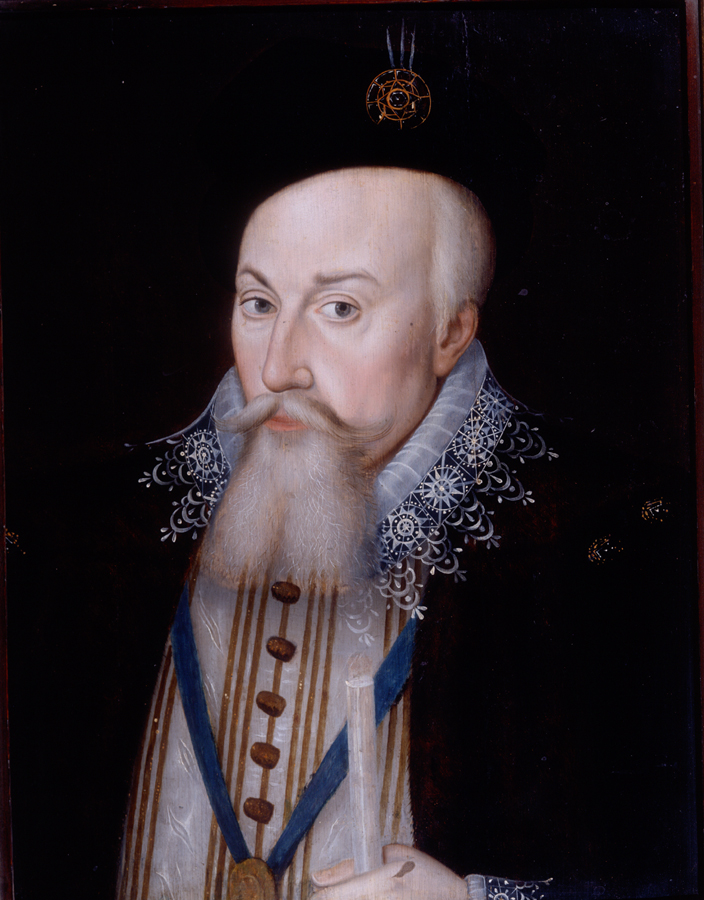
Robert Dudley, Earl of Leicester, 1587

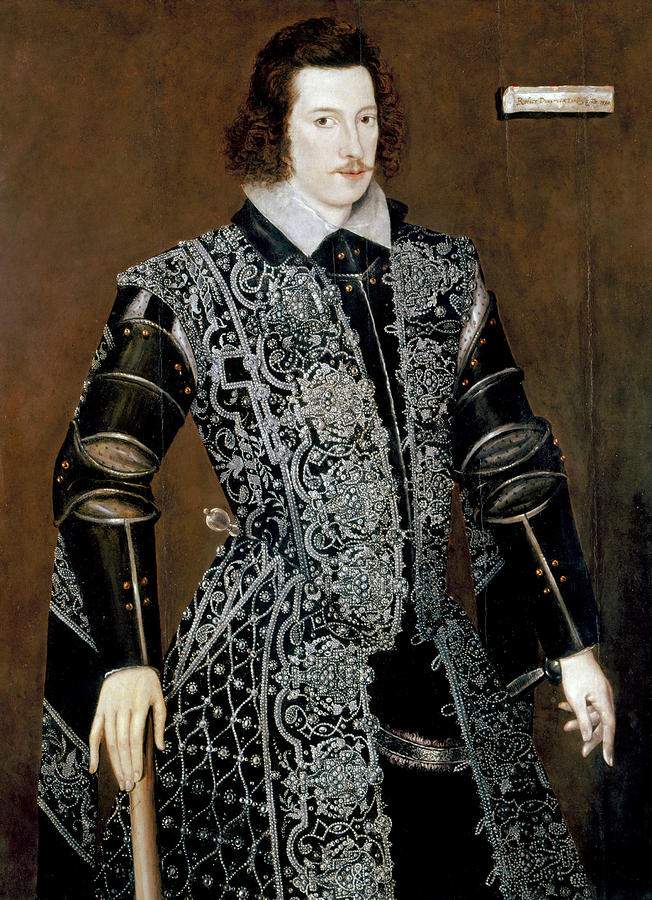
Robert Devereux, Earl of Essex, c. 1590

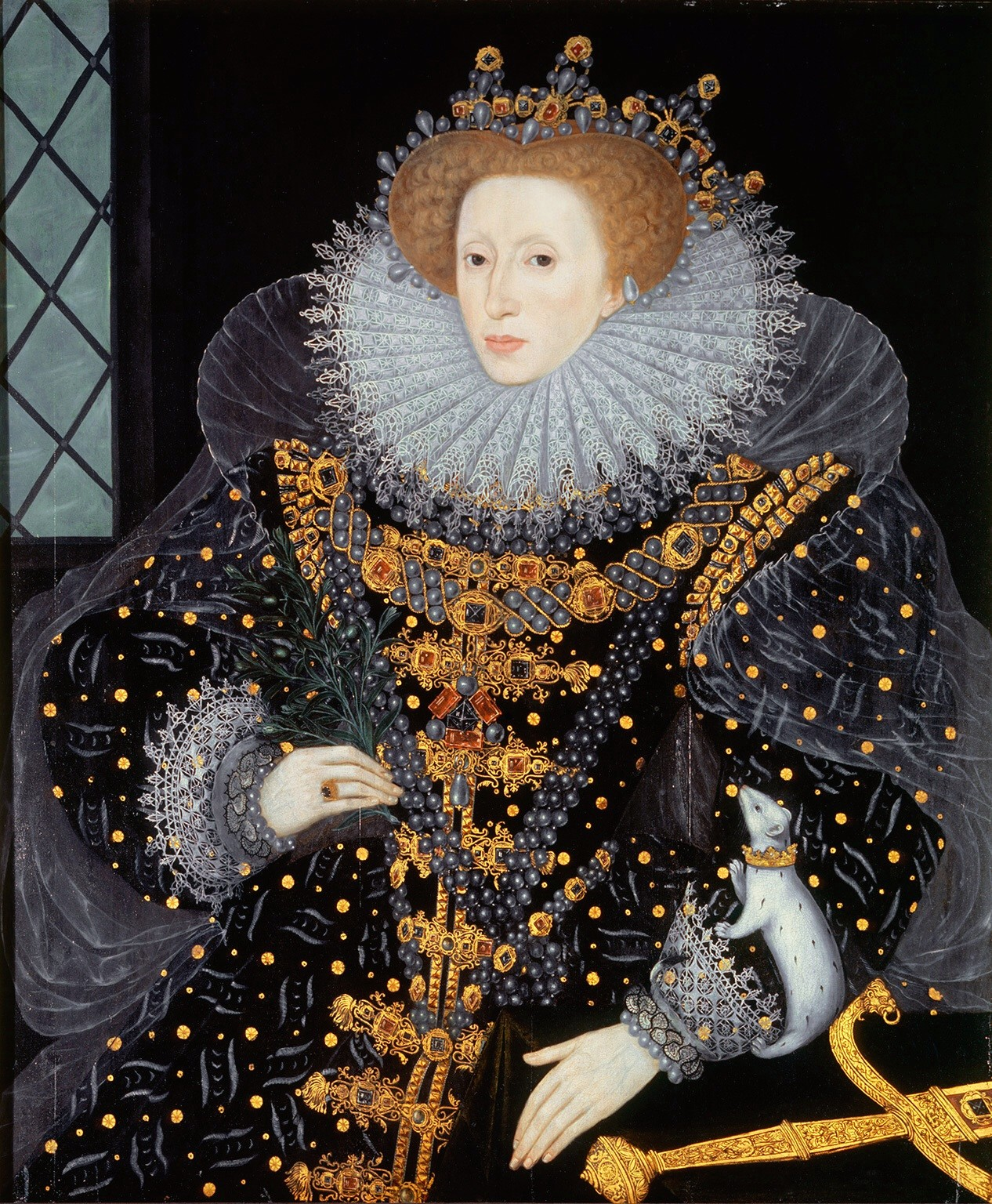
Queen Elizabeth, the "Ermine Portrait" (attributed)

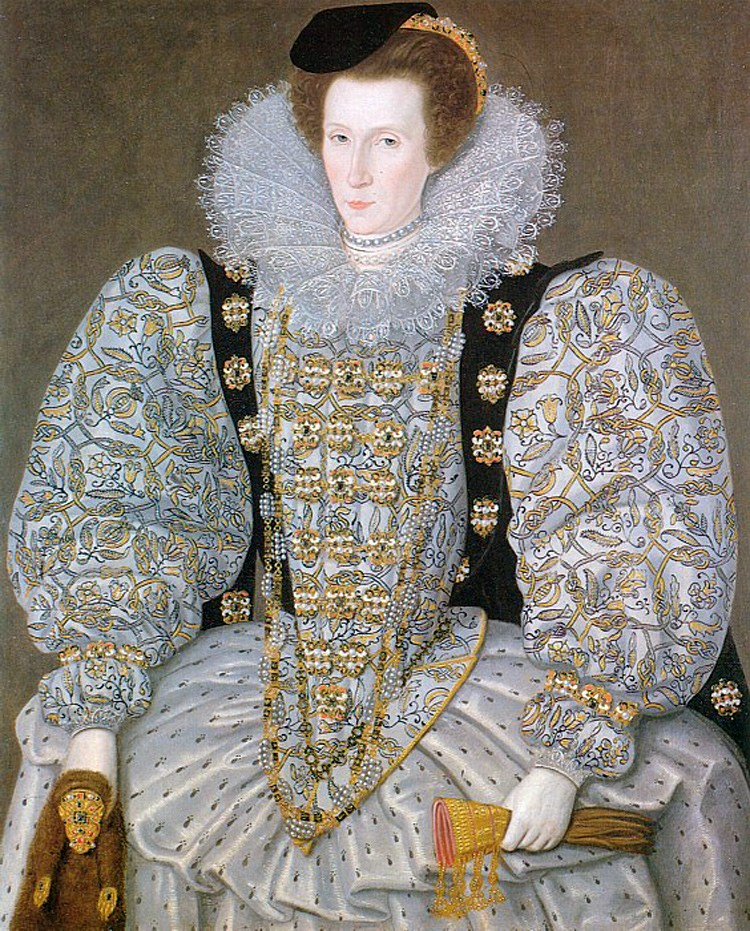
Unknown Lady, c. 1595 (attributed)

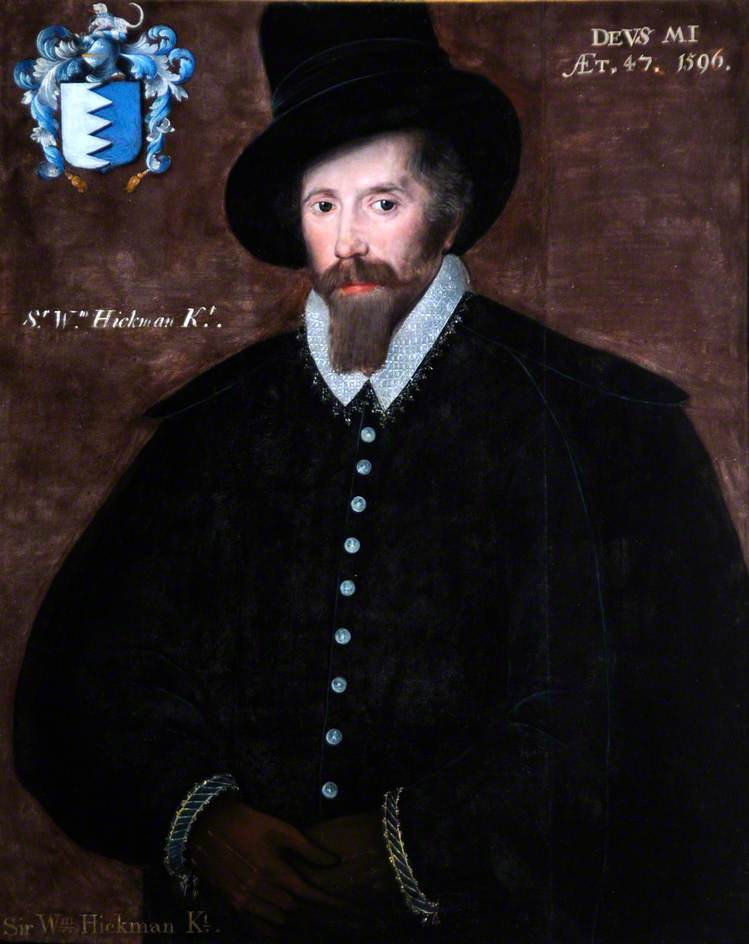
Sir William Hickman Knight

== Arms ==
Coat of arms of William Segar
Crest A caduceus crowned & erect or entwined with 3 serpents vert & between 2 wings respectively or & argent. Escutcheon Quarterly, (1 & 4) azure, a millrind cross argent (Segar); (2 & 3) or, a chevron between 3 mullets azure (Crakenthorpe). Motto Arte et Ingenio ("Art and Science")

== See also ==
- Heraldry
- Artists of the Tudor court

== Notes ==
Heraldic offices
Preceded by Richard Lee	Portcullis Pursuivant of Arms; 1585–1588	Succeeded by Thomas Lant
Preceded by Robert Glover	Somerset Herald of Arms; 1589–1597	Succeeded by Robert Treswell
Preceded by Edmund Knight	Norroy King of Arms; 1593–1603	Succeeded by Richard St George
Preceded by William Dethick	Garter Principal King of Arms; 1607–1633	Succeeded by John Borough
