= John Borough =

Sir John Borough, sometimes Burroughs (died 21 October 1643) was the Garter Principal King of Arms 1633-43.

== Life ==
He was grandson of William Borough, of Sandwich, Kent, by the daughter of Basil Gosall, of Nieuwkerk, Brabant, and son of John Borough, of Sandwich, by his wife, daughter of Robert Denne, of Dennehill, Kent. He received a classical education, and afterwards studied law at Gray's Inn. In 1622, he was at Venice, and from that city he addressed several letters to Robert Cotton, chiefly about the purchase of manuscripts, subscribing himself 'Your faithful servant and poore kinsman'.

He was appointed in 1623 Keeper of the Records in the Tower of London. In June, by the favour of the earl marshal, to whom he was secretary, he was sworn herald-extraordinary by the title of Mowbray, and on 23 December following he was created Norroy king of arms, at Arundel House in the Strand, in the place of Sir Richard St. George, who was created Clarenceux king of arms. He was M.P. for Horsham 1624, 1625 and 1626. On 17 July 1624, he was knighted, and in 1634 made Garter principal king of arms in the place of Sir William Segar, who had died.

As keeper of the records, when King Charles I was discussing the propriety of summoning the great council of peers, Borough was called in with records respecting those assemblies. He attended his sovereign when he went to Scotland to be crowned in 1633. On 14 April 1636, he obtained a grant to entitle him to the fees and perquisites of his office of Garter while employed beyond the seas for the king's special service. As principal king of arms he followed the fortunes of his sovereign in the field during the First English Civil War, and had several narrow escapes while in the royal camp. For instance, Edward Norgate, Windsor herald, writing from Berwick to his cousin Thomas Read, on 3 June 1639, says that the king's tent was shot through once, and Sir John Borough's twice.

Borough was a good note-taker, and drew up accounts of various conferences between the royalists and the parliamentarians. The notes of the interview between Charles and the covenanters in the earl marshal's tent near Berwick on 11 June 1639 were probably taken by him. When the great council met at York he was appointed its clerk, and in that capacity he took the full notes of its proceedings which constitute the only record we possess of what took place in that assembly. Again, when the sixteen commissioners went to Ripon, Borough accompanied them as their clerk, and took notes of the treaty there. Finally when the treaty was adjourned to London, Borough resumed his attendance upon the commissioners, and carried on his notes until the treaty was concluded.

While in the service of the court at Oxford the university conferred upon him the degree of D.C.L. on 5 August 1643. He died about two months afterwards, on 21 October 1643, at Oxford, and was buried the next day at the upper end of the divinity chapel adjoining, on the north side, the choir of Christ Church Cathedral.

== Arms ==
Coat of arms of John Borough
Crest A dove standing on a serpent nowed, all proper. Escutcheon or, on a cross gules 5 pierced mullets or.

== Sources ==
- "Borough, Sir John (d. 1643)". Oxford Dictionary of National Biography (online ed.). Oxford University Press. doi:10.1093/ref:odnb/2913. (Subscription or UK public library membership required.)

Heraldic offices
Preceded by William Segar	Garter Principal King of Arms; 1633–1643	Succeeded by Henry St George
