= Christopher Barker (officer of arms) =

British officer of arms

Sir Christopher Barker (died 4 January 1550) was an officer of arms at the College of Arms in the City of London who rose to the highest position of Garter Principal King of Arms.

== Early years ==
Christopher was the son of William Barker of Stokesley in the North Riding of Yorkshire (now North Yorkshire) and his wife, Joan, the daughter of William Carhill and sister of Sir Christopher Carhill, Norrey King of Arms. In adulthood, he lived in Newbury in Berkshire.

== Heraldic career ==
Barker started his heraldic career as Charles Brandon's private officer of arms. Barker was made Lisle pursuivant in 1513 and Suffolk Herald in 1517. He is known to have accompanied his employer on journeys to France in 1514 and 1515. On 1 November 1522, Barker was made a royal officer of arms as Richmond herald. In June 1536, he was promoted to Norroy King of Arms and was quickly promoted to Garter Principal King of Arms on 15 July.

As Garter King of Arms, Barker helped to organize ceremonies such as the christening of Prince Edward in 1537, the funeral of Queen Jane Seymour in the same year, the proclamation of Henry VIII as King of Ireland in 1541, and the funeral of Henry and the coronation of Edward in 1547. When Henry invaded France in person in 1544, Barker had a prominent place before the King's banner. Before Henry's death, Barker's evidence was crucial when Henry Howard, Earl of Surrey, was condemned to death for including the arms of Edward the Confessor among the many quarters in his coat of arms.

== Personal life ==
Barker married three times. His first wife was Margaret, the widow of John Longe and previously of John Garret. His second wife, Ellen, was Henry Rigby's widow and daughter of Richard Dalton of Croston, Lancashire. With Ellen, Barker had two sons who predeceased him. One of these sons, Justinian, died in Spain in 1543 as Rouge Croix Pursuivant. Barton's nephew, Laurence Dalton, also joined the College of Arms and became Norroy King of Arms. Barker's third wife was Edith, widow of Robert Legge.

In 1521, he joined the Vintners' Company. He was master of the company from 1540 to 1543. Barker was recorded as lying sick at Christmas 1549 and died at Paternoster Row in London on 4 January 1550. He was buried in St Faith's under St Paul's. His widow survived him by only about six months. Many of his heraldic collections and manuscripts compiled by him survive at the College of Arms.

== Arms ==
Coat of arms of Christopher Barker
Crest From a torse or & azure a bear's head erased or muzzled azure, the neck per pale or & azure, all between 2 wings respectively azure & or. Escutcheon Argent, 3 bear's heads erased gules muzzled or with three roundels gules in chief. Badge A bear's head erased gules muzzled or.

== See also ==
- Heraldry
- Officer of arms
