= Stephen Leake =

Numismatist and officer of arms

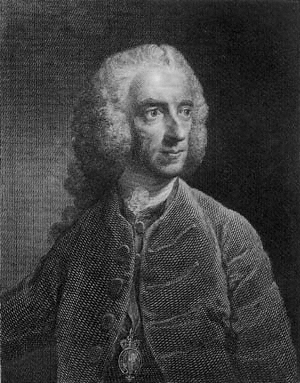
Stephen Martin Leake, 1803 engraving by Thomas Milton.

Stephen Martin Leake (5 April 1702 – 24 March 1773) was a numismatist and long-serving officer of arms at the College of Arms in London.

== Early life ==
Though he eventually rose to the highest rank in the College, he was born as Stephen Martin and was the only son of Captain Stephen Martin, a naval officer, and his wife, Elizabeth. A relative left his considerable estate to Captain Martin on condition that he and his family adopt the additional name and arms of Leake. Shortly after the inheritance was completed in 1721, the family lost more than £20,000. The younger Leake was then holding a clerkship in the Navy Office, but the loss necessitated a search for a better position. His father attempted to buy a post in the Treasury but failed. Leake was admitted to the Middle Temple and made a younger brother of Trinity House in 1723. In 1724 he became a deputy lieutenant for Tower Hamlets.

== Early successes ==
In 1725, the Order of the Bath was "revived" in Britain. Garter Principal King of Arms, Sir John Anstis arranged for Leake to be made an esquire to one of the knights. Anstis had met Leake while working with his family on the Royal Licence to change the family's name. The knight to whom Leake was attached was the Earl of Sussex, deputy Earl Marshal. In March 1726 Leake was elected a fellow of the Society of Antiquaries of London. He also published his essay Nummi Britannici Historia in that year covering the history of English coinage. This work was reissued in several editions during Leake's life.

== Heraldic career ==
Leake had made many powerful connections, but still lacked an appointment that would provide for his needs. Leake tried to use John Anstis to obtain a position at the College of Arms. Anstis used the opportunity of Leake's request to secure an appointment as Garter for his own son. After being embarrassed by Anstis, Leake assumed that he would be able to gain sympathy in other circles. In 1727 his connections gained him a spot as Lancaster Herald of Arms in Ordinary at the College. He was promoted Norroy King of Arms in December 1729.

As a herald and king of arms, Leake directed his energy toward improving the fortunes of the College of Arms. In 1729 he applied to the attorney general for the prosecution of a painter–stainer who offered to research arms for customers. This suit was unsuccessful, but he also sought a new charter for the college that would have confirmed its monopoly on these activities. He also attempted to revive heraldic visitations in 1731 and 1744. His Reasons for Granting Commissions to the Provincial Kings of Arms for Visiting their Provinces was printed in 1744. This, like most of his other projects failed. It was impeded both by Anstis as Garter and by the government. In 1732 Leake was also engaged in the attempted revival of the High Court of Chivalry. After five years nothing had been accomplished, so the court closed. It did sit again until 1954. Though he was not successful in most of these endeavors, he was able to raise the awareness and prestige of the College in England.

Leake was promoted to Clarenceux King of Arms in 1741 and Garter Principal King of Arms in 1754. He immediately became deeply involved in the Order of the Garter, for which the office is named. He worked with the Dean of Windsor to bring the official registers up to date. He also compiled a collection of drawings of knights' stall plates from St George's Chapel, and travelled abroad to invest foreign princes with the Garter.

Though Leake was always a vocal critic of the patronage and purchase by which heralds were appointed, he did have his thirteen-year-old son, John Martin Leake, appointed Chester Herald of Arms in Ordinary in 1752.

== Personal life ==
In 1735 Leake married Anne, daughter of Fletcher Powell, a brewer. They had six sons and three daughters, all of whom survived their father. Powell's estate in Hertfordshire later passed to Leake's descendants. Leake himself lived in Mile End, where he was active in vestry affairs and helped raise volunteer units during the Jacobite rising of 1745, and at Thorpe-le-Soken in Essex, where his father had acquired an estate in 1720. By 1770 he was suffering badly from gout and rheumatism and he died at Mile End on 24 March 1773. He was buried in Bradgate park

== Arms ==
Coat of arms of Stephen Leake
| Adopted Exemplified 1721 Crest A ship gun-carriage with a piece of ordnance mounted thereon proper. Escutcheon Quarterly, (1 & 4) or on a saltire engrailed azure 8 annulets argent & in a canton gules a castle triple-towered argent (Leake); (2 & 3) Paly of 6 pieces or & azure, on a chief gules 3 marleons (merlins) or. Motto Pari Animo ("With like-minded") |

== See also ==
- Heraldry
- Officer of arms
