= John Dugdale (herald) =

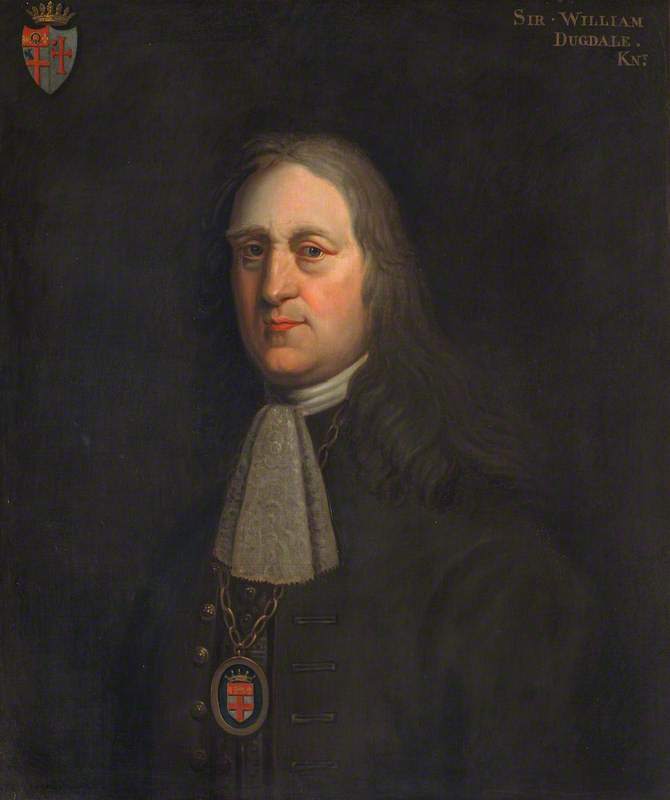
- Born: 1 June 1628; Shustoke, England, Kingdom of England
- Died: 31 August 1700 (aged 72)
- Children: 2 daughters and 1 son
- Parent: William Dugdale

Sir John Dugdale (1 June 1628 – 31 August 1700) was a herald at the College of Arms in the City of London and was the son of William Dugdale (1605–1686), the historian and Garter Principal King of Arms herald.

== Life ==
He was born on 1 June 1628 at Blyth Hall, Shustoke, Warwickshire and was educated at the grammar schools in Sutton Coldfield and Coleshill. He appears to have trained as a surveyor and worked for various royalist landowners during the Interregnum. In 1660 he joined the Earl of Clarendon's household as senior gentleman usher. In 1662, he married Mary Baker, the daughter of a Windsor attorney. They had two children, William and Mary. Following his wife's death in 1671, he married Elizabeth Pigeon, the heiress of a Coventry apothecary, with whom he had a daughter Elizabeth.

In 1675 he replaced his brother-in-law Elias Ashmole as Windsor Herald, although his continued service in the Hyde household meant that he was not an active herald. From the autumn of 1684 his father no longer travelled to London in the winter and a formal deputation was obtained for John to act as Garter King of Arms. His correspondence with his father indicates his discomfort in the role and with the factionalism within the College of Arms. He acted as Garter at the coronation of James II. He hoped to succeed his father, who died in February 1686, but the influence of his friends was only sufficient to gain him the post of Norroy King of Arms. He was also knighted. In the 1690s, he hoped to resign in favour of Gregory King, but was refused permission and died in office in 1700.

== Arms ==
Coat of arms of John Dugdale
Notes Same arms as his father's. Crest A griffin's head & wings or. Escutcheon Argent, a millrind cross (Cross moline) gules with a roundel gules in the dexter canton. Motto Pestis Patriae Pigrities ("Sloth is the bane of a country")
