= Richard St George (died 1726) =

Sir Richard St George (1657 – 28 September 1726) was an Irish landowner.

He was the only surviving son of Sir George St George of Dunmore, and first cousin of George St George, 1st Baron St George. In June 1686 he married Anne, daughter of Colonel John Eyre of Eyre Court; they had no children and she died in November 1719.

He was elected to the Irish House of Commons as Member of Parliament for Clogher in September 1703, sitting until his death. In October 1711 he succeeded to his father's estates in County Galway and on 23 November 1715 he was appointed to the Privy Council of Ireland.

He died without heirs in September 1726, and his four surviving sisters became co-heiresses to the Dunmore property. Eventually his niece Elizabeth became sole heiress; she was the wife of Sir Ralph Gore, 4th Baronet and the estate thus passed to the family of the Gore baronets.

He left a natural daughter Mary St George, who married James Mansergh in 1749, as his second wife. Their son Richard St George Mansergh-St George was the ancestor of the St Georges of Headford.
