= William Dethick =

English officer of arms (c.1542–1612)

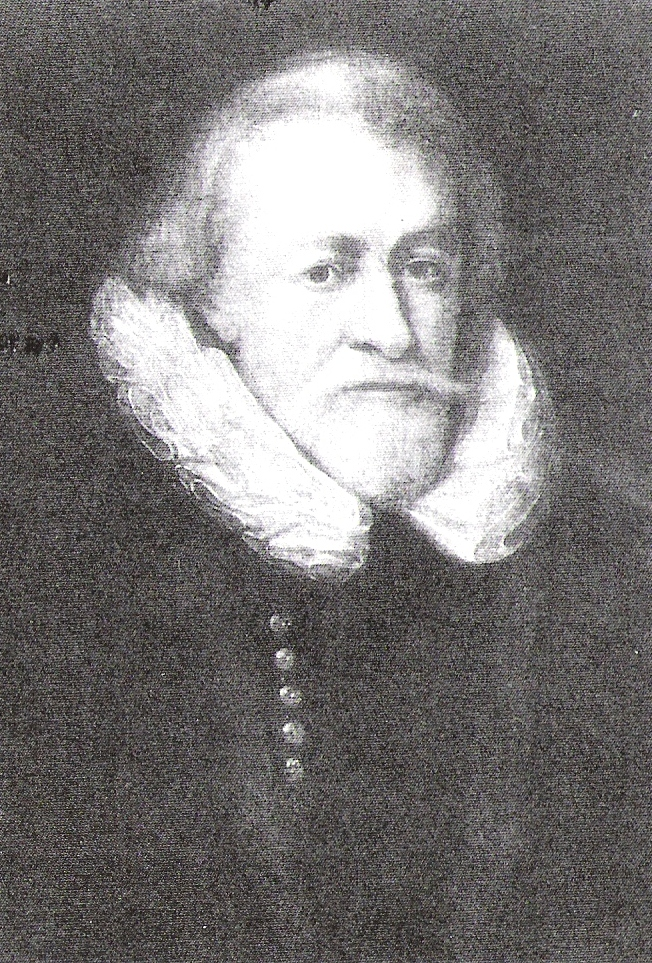
A portrait of William Dethick in 1598

Sir William Dethick (c. 1542–1612) was a long-serving officer of arms at the College of Arms in London. He was the son of Sir Gilbert Dethick and followed his father as Garter Principal King of Arms. Though he was adjudged a qualified armorist and antiquarian, Dethick's biography is notable for numerous instances of conflict with his colleagues and others.

== Heraldic career ==
William Dethick was educated at St John's College, Cambridge. He was appointed Rouge Croix Pursuivant of Arms in 1567 and York Herald of Arms in 1570. His father and predecessor as Garter, Sir Gilbert Dethick died in March, 1584. The office of Garter was held vacant for two years, during which time Clarenceux King of Arms Robert Cook served as interim Garter. On 21 April 1586, William Dethick was appointed Garter.

In May 1604, William Dethick was sent by King James to Frederick I, Duke of Württemberg with Sir Robert Spencer. They presented jewels including two garters with diamonds and rubies, and two St Georges with diamonds and rubies, and a gold chain or collar, made by the London goldsmiths, John Spilman and William Herrick.

== Personal character ==
Biographers note that Dethick was embroiled in strife throughout his career to a degree notable even for his time period, including numerous accusations of physical assault. In 1573, Mary White, the wife of Chester Herald, reported that Dethick assaulted her with a coal basket and rubbed hot ashes into her hair. He was also reported to have attacked his father with his fists, stabbed his elder brother, and stabbed another man while at a funeral in Westminster Abbey.

In his professional capacity his qualifications were high and he was judged by his peers a skillful herald, but he was a constant transgressor. As York Herald, he confirmed arms under his own seal, thus usurping the prerogative of the Kings of Arms. He was also able to secure extra powers in his patent of appointment as Garter King of Arms by bribing the Clerk of the Signet.

In 1601, Henry Howard, 1st Earl of Northampton, Robert Sidney, and Edward Dyer formed a commission to review the activities of Dethick and the officers of arms at Derby House. The commission was continued by James VI and I and investigated complaints about Dethick's behaviour at a funeral, handling of fees, and the promotion of his son as Windsor Herald. They suggested that William Smith should be made Windsor Herald instead. Smith wrote to Northampton detailing how experienced and talented heralds were passed over for promotion, and the work of painting arms often given to painters who were not heralds.

Dethick surrendered his patent though he continued in the office. In January 1604, the authorities appointed William Segar as Garter. Dethick resisted his deposition until 1606 when he was given a pension of £200 per year.

Dethick was knighted on 13 May 1603. He died in 1612 and was buried in St Paul's Cathedral. The grave and monument were destroyed in the Great Fire of London in 1666. His name appears on a modern monument in the crypt, listing important graves lost in the fire.

== Arms ==
Coat of arms of William Dethick
Crest A nag's head argent differenced as the arms. Escutcheon Quarterly with a crescent over all; (1) argent, a fess vairy gules & or between 3 bougets sable, with a mullet on a crescent for difference (Dethick); (2) argent, a chief gules & on a bend over all azure 3 escutcheon argent each charged with a chief gules (Allestree), both as Sir Gilbert; (3) or, a chevron gules & canton ermine (Stafford); (4) ermine, a chevron engrailed azure between 3 pinks gules slipped vert (Peterson, for his mother). Motto Mors Aut Victoria Laeta ("Death or A Sweet Victory")

== Notes ==
Preceded by Henry Cotgrove	Rouge Croix Pursuivant; 1567–1570	Succeeded by Thomas Dawes
Preceded by Ralph Langman	York Herald; 1570–1586	Succeeded by Humphrey Hales
Preceded by vacancy	Garter King of Arms; 1586–1606	Succeeded by William Segar
