= Charles Townley (officer of arms) =

Sir Charles Townley (7 May 1713 – 7 June 1774) was a long-serving officer of arms at the College of Arms in London.

== Early and private life ==
Charles Townley was born on Tower Hill in 1713, the son of Charles Townley, of Clapham, Surrey and Sarah Wilde, daughter of William Wilde of Long-Whatton in Leicestershire. His mother died the following year. His father remarried twice; with Gertrude Kirkes, he had a large family. Townley was a descendant of a younger branch of the Town(e)ley family of Towneley Hall, Burnley, Lancashire, the head of which at this time was the antiquary Charles Towneley.

Sir Charles married Mary, the youngest daughter of George Eastwood of Thornhill in the West Riding of Yorkshire, and had four children: Charles (who became Lancaster Herald of Arms in Ordinary), William, John and Mary.

== Heraldic career ==
He began his heraldic career as York Herald of Arms in Ordinary in 1735, having "agreed to purchase Mr Jones, York's, tabard, for £400". In other words, he purchased the position from his predecessor. There was opposition to his obtaining the position because of his relation to the Townleys of Lancashire, who were involved in the Jacobite rising of 1715. The king, George II, eventually granted letters patent appointing him to the position. This was the first patent appointing a herald to have been written in English. Townley's appointment was also notable for having a warrant issued by Francis Howard, Earl of Effingham as Deputy Earl Marshal allowing the ceremony of creation as a herald to be dispensed with, even though a patent had been signed to perform it. He progressed through the ranks of the College of Arms, being appointed Norroy King of Arms on 2 November 1751 and Clarenceux King of Arms on 11 January 1755.

He was knighted in September 1761 and ended his career with an appointment to the most senior position of Garter Principal King of Arms in 1772. He held this post until his death two years later.

== Arms ==
Coat of arms of Charles Townley
Adopted 4 July 1743 Crest On a perch or a hawk close proper, beak & bells or, a riband gules twined about the perch. Escutcheon Quarterly, (1 & 4) argent, a fess & in chief 3 mullets sable, with an annulet on a mullet or for difference (Townley); (2 & 3) argent, a chevron engrailed sable ermined argent & on a chief sable 3 martlets argent (Wilde, granted 4 July 1743). Motto Tenez la Vraye ("Hold to the truth")

== See also ==
- Heraldry
- Pursuivant
- King of Arms
