= Norroy and Ulster King of Arms =

Officer of Arms of the College of Arms of the United Kingdom

- The arms of office of the Norroy and Ulster King of Arms
- Heraldic tradition: British
- Jurisdiction: England north of the river Trent and Northern Ireland
- Governing body: College of Arms

Norroy and Ulster King of Arms is the provincial King of Arms at the College of Arms with jurisdiction over England north of the Trent and Northern Ireland. The two offices of Norroy and Ulster were formerly separate. Norroy King of Arms is the older office, there being a reference as early as 1276 to a "King of Heralds beyond the Trent in the North". The name Norroy is derived from the Old French nor(t) meaning "north" and roy which means "king", a "North King". The office of Ulster Principal King of Arms for All-Ireland was established in 1552 by King Edward VI to replace the older post of Ireland King of Arms, which had lapsed in 1487.

Ulster King of Arms was not part of the College of Arms and did not fall under the jurisdiction of the Earl Marshal, being the heraldic authority for the Kingdom of Ireland (the jurisdiction of the College of Arms being the Kingdom of England and Lord Lyon's Office that of the Kingdom of Scotland).

Ulster was Registrar and King of Arms of the Order of St Patrick. Norroy and Ulster King of Arms now holds this position, though no new knights of that Order have been created since 1936, and the last surviving knight died in 1974. Heraldic matters in the Republic of Ireland are now handled by the office of the Chief Herald of Ireland (a part of the Genealogical Office in the National Library).

The arms of the new office of Norroy and Ulster King of Arms were devised in 1980 based on elements from the arms of the two former offices. They are blazoned: Quarterly Argent and Or a Cross Gules on a Chief per pale Azure and Gules a Lion passant guardant Or crowned with an open Crown between a Fleur-de-lis and a Harp Or.

The current Norroy and Ulster King of Arms is Clive Cheesman who was appointed to the office on 14 November 2024.

== Norroy Kings of Arms until 1943 ==
The coat of arms of the Norroy King of Arms, in use by circa 1500: Argent, a cross gules & on a chief per pale azure & gules a lion passant guardant crowned with an open crown between a fleur de lis and a key, all or.

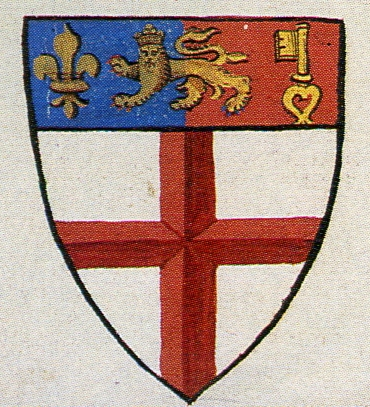
The coat of arms of Norroy King of Arms, taken from Lant's Roll c. 1595

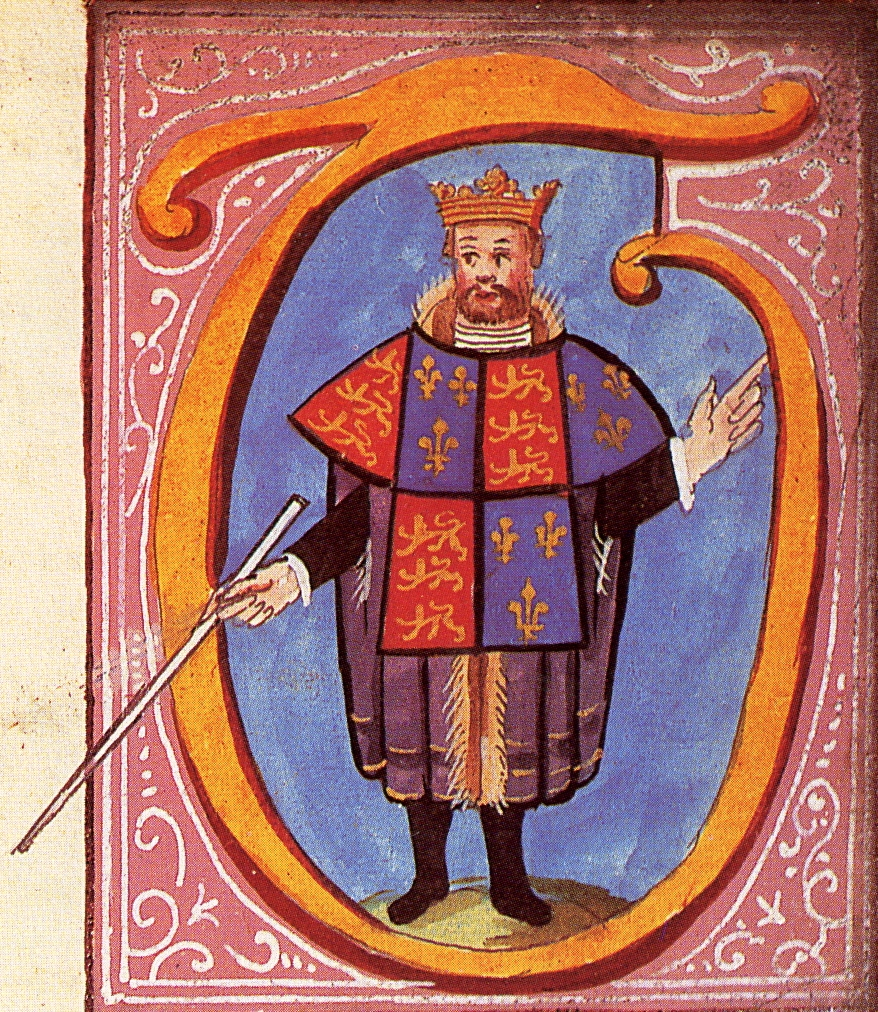
Thomas Hawley served as Norroy from 1534–1536.

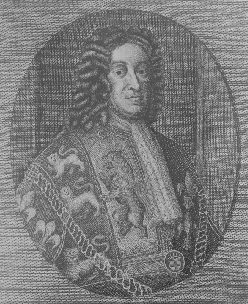
Peter Le Neve served as Norroy from 1704–1729.

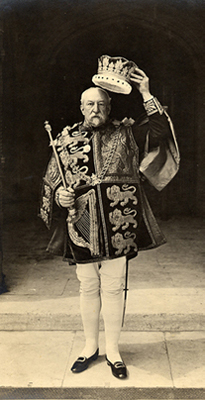
Sir William Weldon at the Coronation of Edward VII in 1902.

Arms	Name	Dates of office	Notes	Ref
	Peter de Horbury	(1276)		
	Andrew	(1338)		
	John Othelake	1386–1399		
Office holders referred to as Lancaster King of Arms. This title was used for the King of Arms of the northern province in the reigns of Henry IV, V and VI, instead of Norroy.
	Richard Bruges	1399–1426		
	John Ashwell	1426–1436		
	William Boys	1436–1447		
	William Tyndale	1447–1464		
The title reverted to Norroy King of Arms.
	Thomas Holme	1464–1477		
	John Writhe	1477–1478		
	John Moore	1478–1493		
	Roger Machado	1493-1493		
	Christopher Carlill	1493–1510		
	Thomas Benolt	1510-1510		
	John Yonge	1510–1516		
	Thomas Wall	1516–1522		
	John Joyner	1522-1522		
	Thomas Tonge	1522–1534		
	Thomas Hawley	1534–1536		
	Sir Christopher Barker	1536		
	William Fellows	1536–1546		
	Gilbert Dethick	1546–1550		
	William Harvey	1550–1557		
	Lawrence Dalton	1557–1562		
	William Flower	1562–1588		
	Edmund Knight	1592–1593		
	William Segar	1593–1603	Morgan Coleman had also applied for the position.	
	Sir Richard St George	1603–1623		
	Sir John Burroughs	1623–1634		
	Sir William le Neve	1634–1635		
	Sir Henry St George	1635–1644		
	Sir Edward Walker	1644–1645		
	William Ryley	1646–1658		
	George Owen	1658–1660		
	Sir William Dugdale	1660–1677		
	Sir Henry St George, the younger	1677–1680		
	Sir Thomas St George	1680–1686		
	Sir John Dugdale	1686–1700		
	Robert Devenish	1700–1704		
	Peter Le Neve	1704–1729		
	Stephen Leake	1729–1741		
	John Cheale	1741–1751		
	Sir Charles Townley	1751–1756		
	William Oldys	1756–1761		
	Thomas Brown	1761–1773		
	Ralph Bigland	1773–1774		
	Sir Isaac Heard	1774–1780		
	Peter Dore	1780–1781		
	Thomas Lock	1781–1784		
	George Harrison	1784–1803		
	Ralph Bigland	1803–1822		
	Edmund Lodge	1822–1838		
	Joseph Hawker	1838–1839		
	Francis Martin	1839–1846		
	James Pulman	1846–1858		
	Edward Howard-Gibbon	1848–1849		
	Robert Laurie	1849–1859		
	Walter Blount	1859–1882		
	George Cokayne	1882–1894		
	Sir William Weldon	1894–1911		
	Sir Henry Burke	1911–1919		
	Charles Athill	1919		
	William Lindsay	1919–1922		
	Gordon Lee	1922–1926		
	Sir Arthur Cochrane	1926–1928		
	Sir Gerald Wollaston	1928–1930		
	Sir Algar Howard	1931–1943		
Title combined with Ulster King of Arms

== Ulster Kings of Arms until 1943 ==
The coat of arms of the Ulster King of Arms; Or, a cross Gules and on a chief Gules a lion passant guardant between a harp and portcullis all Or.

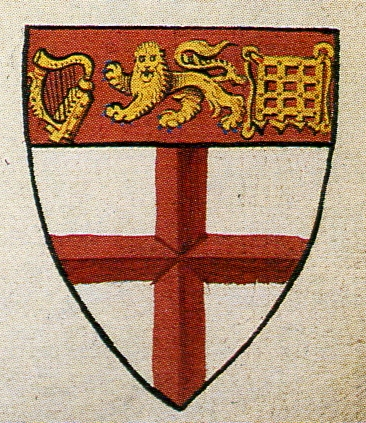
The coat of arms of Ulster King of Arms, also taken from Lant's Roll

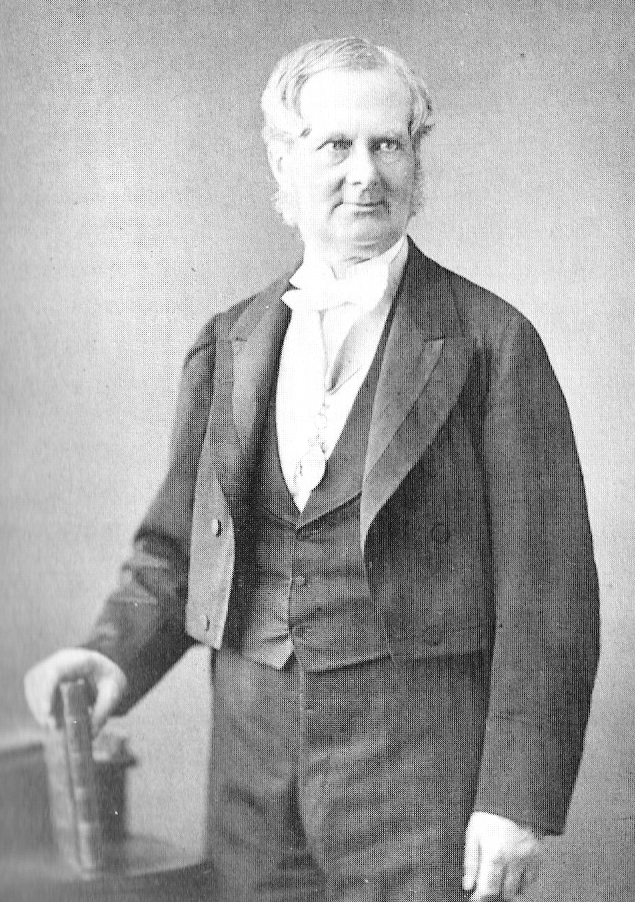
Sir Bernard Burke, helped publish Burke's Peerage in 1826. His son Henry Farnham Burke became Garter King of Arms.

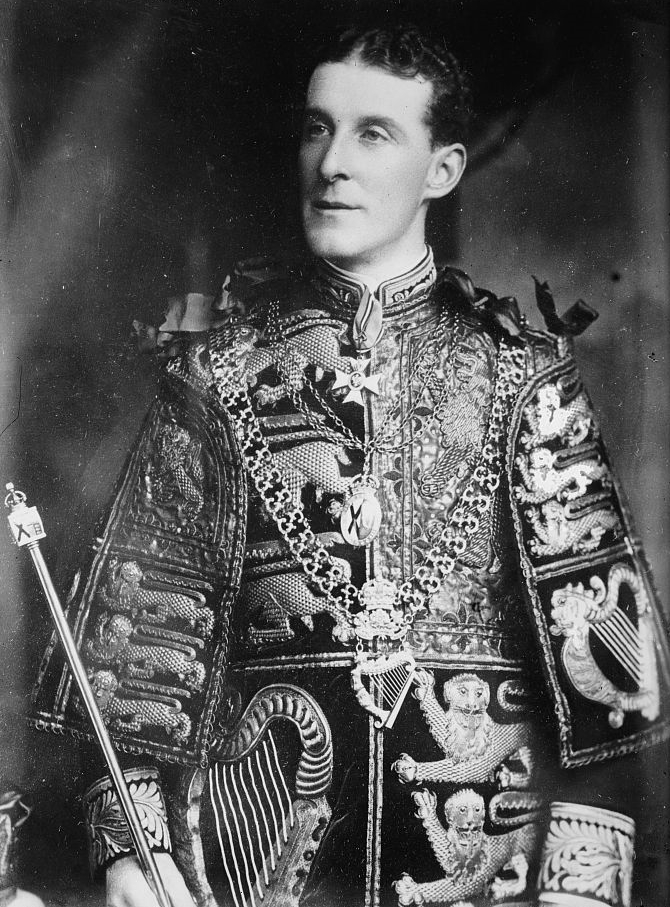
Sir Arthur Vicars served as Ulster from 1893–1908.

Arms	Name	Dates of office	Notes	Ref
Title formerly Ireland King of Arms
	Bartholomew W. Butler	1552–1566		
	Nicholas Narbon	1566–1588		
	Christopher Ussher	1566–1588		
	Daniel Molyneux	1597–1629		
	Daniel Molyneux and Adam Ussher	1629–1633		
	Thomas Preston, 1st Viscount Tara	1633–1655		
	Sir Richard Carney	1655–1660		
	Sir Richard St George	1660–1683		
	Sir Richard Carney and George Wallis	1683–1698		
	William Hawkins	1698–1722		
	William Hawkins and John Hawkins	1722–1759		
	James McCulloch	1759–1765		
	William Hawkins	1765–1787	Knighted 17 March 1783	
	Gerald Fortescue	1787–1788		
	Rear Admiral Sir Chichester Fortescue	1788–1820		
	Sir William Betham	1820–1853		
	Sir Bernard Burke	1853–1892		
	Sir Arthur Vicars	1893–1908		
	Sir Nevile Wilkinson	1908–1940		
Vacant, duties performed by Thomas Sadleir (Deputy Ulster)
Duties in the Republic of Ireland taken up by the Chief Herald of Ireland

== Norroy and Ulster Kings of Arms from 1943 ==
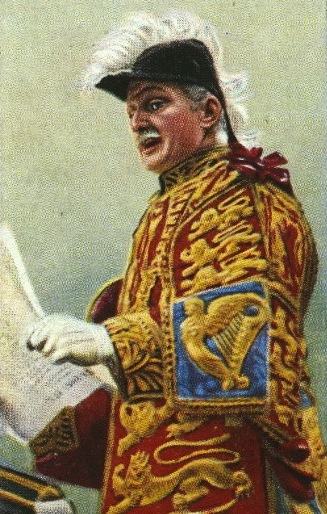
Sir Algar Howard became the first Norroy and Ulster King of Arms in 1949.

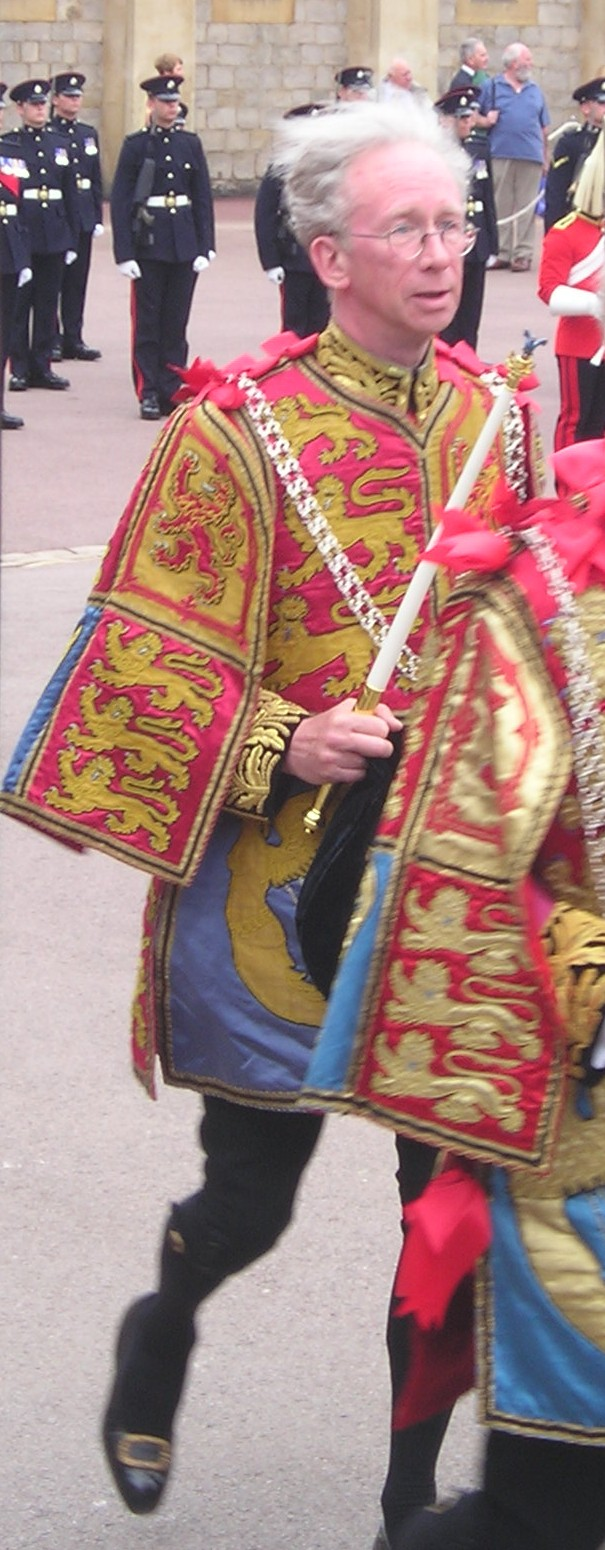
Sir Henry Paston-Bedingfeld held the title from 2010 to 2014.

Arms	Name	Dates of office	Notes	Ref
	Sir Algar Howard	1943–1944	Howard was descended from the Dukes of Norfolk; he was born in Thornbury Castle, where he lived for many years. Educated at King's College London, he was later admitted to the Inner Temple as a barrister. His first appointment at the College was in May 1911 as Fitzalan Pursuivant Extraordinary and he attended the Investiture of Edward, Prince of Wales that year. He was promoted to Rouge Dragon Pursuivant that October, followed by Windsor Herald in 1919 and Norroy King of Arms in 1931, to which was added Ulster King of Arms in 1943. After he resigned as Garter, he served as Extra Gentleman Usher to Queen Elizabeth II from 1952 till his death, aged 89, in 1970.	
	Sir Gerald Wollaston	1944–1957	A grandson of Sir Albert William Woods, Wollaston was educated at Harrow School and then Trinity College, Cambridge, where he graduated in 1893 with a law degree. He was called to the Bar in 1899, but joined the College three years later as Fitzalan Pursuivant Extraordinary for the coronation of Edward VII. Appointments as Bluemantle Pursuivant (1906), Richmond Herald (1919), and Norroy King of Arms (1928) followed. Having served as Henry Farnham Burke's deputy for a year, he succeeded him as Garter and oversaw the coronation of George VI; his experience and knowledge of ceremonial proved useful in assisting the young Earl Marshal. Earlier in his career, he was often called on to counsel in peerage cases. A "most painstaking and skilled herald with special bent to ceremonial", he published The Court of Claims in 1902, 1910 and 1936. After his Gartership, he served as Norroy and Ulster until his death in 1957.	
	Aubrey Toppin	1957–1966		
	Richard Graham-Vivian	1966–1971		
	Sir Walter Verco	1971–1980		
	John Brooke-Little	1980–1995	Brooke-Little was educated at Clayesmore School and New College, Oxford, where his interest in heraldry grew and his friends included the future Garter, Colin Cole. He joined the Earl Marshal's staff in 1952 and was a Gold Stick Officer at the coronation in 1953. Appointed Bluemantle Pursuivant in 1956 and Richmond Herald in 1967, Brooke-Little also served as Registrar at the College (1974–82), Norroy and Ulster King of Arms and Registrar of the Order of St Patrick (1980–85) and director of the Heralds' Museum from 1991 until his retirement. He founded the Heraldry Society in 1947 and was its Chairman for fifty years, after which he was its President; he edited its journal, The Coat of Arms, until 2004. His published work included updated editions of Boutell's Heraldry and Fox-Davies's Complete Guide to Heraldry. According to The Daily Telegraph, he was the "brightest and ablest herald of his generation", but did not attain Gartership partly due to his "chaotic working practices". He died in 2006.	
	Hubert Chesshyre	1995–1997	After attending Trinity College, Cambridge, and Christ Church, Oxford, and graduating from both universities, Chesshyre became Rouge Croix Pursuivant in 1970, before serving as Chester Herald between 1978 and 1995 and Honorary Genealogist to the Royal Victorian Order from 1987 to 2010. He has been a member of the Westminster Abbey Architectural Advisory Panel and the Heraldry Society's Council. Along with Thomas Woodcock, he co-authored the Dictionary of British Arms: Medieval Armorial, volume 1.	
	Thomas Woodcock	1997–2010	Woodcock was educated at Durham University and Darwin College, Cambridge. He was called to the Bar in 1975, but started work as a research assistant to Sir Anthony Wagner that year. He was appointed Rouge Croix in 1978, Somerset in 1982 and Norroy and Ulster in 1997. He has co-authored a number of works on heraldry, including The Oxford Guide to Heraldry (1988) and all four volumes of Dictionary of British Arms: Medieval Ordinary (1992–2014).	
	Patric Dickinson	2010	Dickinson was educated at Exeter College, Oxford, and was President of the Oxford Union in 1972. A research assistant at the College of Arms since 1968, his first heraldic appointment was ten years later, when he became Rouge Dragon Pursuivant. Promotions to Richmond Herald (1989) and Norroy and Ulster King of Arms (2010) followed, before he became Clarenceux. Having served as the College's Treasurer since 1995, Dickinson was also the Earl Marshal's Secretary from 1996 to 2012 and has been President of the Society of Genealogists since 2005.	
	Sir Henry Paston-Bedingfeld	2010–2014		
	Timothy Duke	2014–2021		
	Robert Noel	2021–2024		
	Clive Cheesman	2024–present		

== See also ==
- Ireland King of Arms
- Irish heraldry
- Heraldry
- Officer of Arms
- Edward MacLysaght
