= Ireland King of Arms =

Title of the officer of arms to two positions in medieval England

- The arms of office of the Ireland King of Arms
- Heraldic tradition: British
- Jurisdiction: Ireland
- Governing body: College of Arms

Ireland King of Arms was the title of an officer of arms to the King of England and Lord of Ireland from 1392 until the accession of Henry VII as King of England in 1485. A king of arms is the highest of the three levels of officers of arms, and usually enjoys heraldic jurisdiction over a geographical area. Despite the name Ireland King of Arms did not appear to exercise heraldic authority in Ireland, and indeed the connection with Ireland seems rather tenuous. The office may have been created preparatory to a subsequently aborted military expedition to Ireland. The last holder of the office, Walter Bellinger, did exercise the heraldic prerogative of a king of arms to grant armorial bearings, however two of his grants were annulled or regranted by other kings of arms as they felt he encroached on their provinces. In 1552, 70 years after the last Ireland King of Arms, the office of Ulster King of Arms was created. The holders of this office exercised control over the heraldic affairs of Ireland until the death of its last incumbent, Major Sir Neville Wilkinson, in 1941. Thereafter, heraldic affairs within what later became (in April 1949) the Republic of Ireland were transferred to the Government of Ireland while the jurisdiction of Norroy King of Arms expanded to include Northern Ireland when the present office of Norroy and Ulster King of Arms was established in the College of Arms.

== Origins of the office ==
In 1392, King Richard II of England created the first in a succession of Ireland kings of arms. It is unknown why such an office was called into being. Froissart notes the creation of Chandos le Roy d'Ireland, but does not give any clues as to the reasoning. It does, however, fit into the general English policy in Ireland at the time. Richard II sought to re-establish English control in those areas where the native Irish had reasserted their independence. The appointment can be seen as a necessary part of the preparations for the appointment of the Duke of Gloucester as Lord Lieutenant of Ireland in 1392. Richard intended Gloucester to lead a major military campaign, and such a campaign would have necessitated the involvement of heralds to marshal arms and provide advice and evidence in case of heraldic disputes.

Richard and Gloucester's campaign of 1392 never happened, but Richard did leave for Ireland in 1394 with a large army, accompanied by John Othelake, who had succeeded Chandos as Ireland King of Arms in 1393. No details are given of Othelake's career as Ireland King of Arms, although he certainly had a connection with Ireland as an officer of arms to the Earl of March in 1381. The historical evidence does not even make clear how long Othelake served in the position.

It is clear that Othelake was no longer enjoying the office by 1420. By this time, John Kitley had been appointed to the post, though the exact date of his appointment is unknown. He was appointed by King Henry V of England on the insistence of the Earl of Ormonde. There is no evidence to suggest that Kitley had any connection to Ireland, or even that he visited it, but his connection to Earl of Ormonde is interesting. Kitley was succeeded by Thomas Collyer, who had previously served as Clarenceux King of Arms and Lancaster Herald of Arms in Ordinary. Nothing is known of his career as Ireland, and he was succeeded by Thomas Ashwell.

== Walter Bellinger ==
Walter Bellinger enjoyed the office of Ireland King of Arms from at least 1468. This is proven by the fact that on 3 June 1469, King Edward IV granted Bellinger a pension of £20 per annum for his service as Ireland. The same writ states that he had been appointed on 9 June the year before. Bellinger was a native of Dieppe, and had served as a herald for fifty-five years by 1477. He accompanied his King to France and acted as his ambassador to the French court in the discussions preceding the Treaty of Picquigny. The French King gave him the value of 100 silver marks for his services in that affair. Bellinger held the office of Ireland King of Arms until the reign of Henry VII of England. After Bellinger, no one was appointed to fill the office.

== Impact and legacy ==
Bellinger is the only Ireland King of Arms known to have made any grants of arms. However two of his four known grants were annulled and or regranted, because their recipients were within the heraldic jurisdiction of other kings of arms. There is no evidence to suggest that any Ireland Kings of Arms ever attempted to exercise control over the heraldic practice of Ireland.

In 1552, Bartholomew Butler was created Ulster King of Arms. Edward VI wrote in his journal of the occasion "There was a king of arms made for Ireland, whose name was Ulster, and whose province was Ireland, and he was...the first herald of Ireland." Ulster King of Arms was thus a new creation, rather than a revival of Ireland King of Arms, and unlike the latter had heraldic jurisdiction over Ireland. While heraldic control in the Republic of Ireland was transferred to the Government of Ireland, the heraldic functions for Northern Ireland transferred to London within the province of the present Norroy and Ulster King of Arms.

== See also ==
- Office of the Chief Herald of Ireland
