= George St George (Carrick MP) =

Sir George St George, knight, of Dunmore (born by 1640 – died December 1713) was an Irish Member of Parliament. He represented Carrick in the Irish House of Commons from September 1703 to his death, sitting alongside his nephew Oliver St George.

He was the younger son of Sir George St George, knight, of Carrickdrumrusk and Katherine Gifford, brother of Sir Oliver St George, 1st Baronet, and grandson of Sir Richard St George, Clarenceux King of Arms. On 18 December 1666 he was granted over 8,000 acres (32 km^{2}) in the baronies of Dunmore, Ballymoe and Tiaquin, County Galway.

He married Elizabeth, daughter of Robert Hannay, 2nd Baronet, and died in October 1711, having had issue:

- Richard, who married Anne Eyre and died without issue in 1726
- George, died unmarried
- Jane, who married St George Ashe, and had issue
  - St George Ashe, died in January 1721
  - Elizabeth, wife of Ralph Gore, 4th Baronet and eventual sole heiress of her grandfather George St George.
- Catherine, who married Charles Crowe and had issue
  - Sackville Crowe, died unmarried
- Elizabeth, wife of William Parsons, 2nd Baronet, died without issue in February 1739
- Lettice
- Emilia, wife of Robert Carleton, died without issue.

His sister Eleanor (died 1713) was the wife of Arthur Gore, 1st Baronet.
