= Henry St George, the younger =

English officer of arms

Sir Henry St George, the younger
- Born: July 1625; Hertford, England, Kingdom of England
- Died: 12 August 1715 (aged 90); England, Kingdom of England
- Occupation: Officer of arms
- Parent: Henry George

Sir Henry St George, the younger (July 1625 – 12 August 1715), was an English officer of arms. He was a younger son of the herald Henry St George (1581–1644).

== Life ==
He was born in July 1625 in St Andrew's parish, Hertford, the third-born but second-surviving child of Sir Henry St George and Mary Dayrell. He had an older brother named Thomas, and at least one younger brother, Richard, and a at least one younger sister, Frances.

Nothing is known of his life prior to 1660. He was appointed Richmond Herald at the Restoration by patent dated 18 June 1660. This was some weeks before his elder brother Thomas was appointed a herald, and was consequently senior to him. As deputy to Sir Edward Walker, he went on a mission to Stockholm. On 29 July 1669, he invested Charles XI, king of Sweden, with the Order of the Garter.

He succeeded William Dugdale as Norroy King of Arms in 1677 and was knighted. He worked closely with Dugdale, for whom he acted as deputy when the latter was in Warwickshire. He was promoted to be Clarenceux King of Arms in 1680, after the death of Edward Bysshe. St George was displaced as Dugdale's deputy by John Dugdale during the final years of the elder Dugdale's life. This led to a quarrel between the St George brothers and the Dugdale father and son.

St George was responsible for the visitation of twelve Counties in his region between 1681 and 1700. He gave the profits of six as a contribution towards rebuilding the College of Arms, which had been burnt in the Great Fire of London. Following his elder brother's death, he was appointed Garter King of Arms in 1703.

He married Elizabeth Wingfield (d. 1704), but had no children. He died at the College of Arms on 12 August 1715 and was buried in St Benet Paul's Wharf, London, on 18 August. His large collection of books and manuscripts was dispersed after his death, although a portion has since been acquired by the College of Arms. John Anstis, his successor as Garter, described St George as "a timorous animal, governed by every creature, minding only his iron chest and the contents of it".

== Arms ==
Coat of arms of Henry St George, Younger
Notes Same arms as his father Adopted 26 September 1627 Crest A demi-lion as in the Arms Escutcheon Argent, a chief azure & over all a lion rampant gules crowned or. (This represents the family.) On a canton or, an escutcheon azure charged with 3 crowns or. (This represents an augmentation of the arms of Sweden granted to his father by King Gustavus Adolphus by patent on 26 September 1627). Motto Firmitas in Coelo ("Stability in Heaven")
