= Christopher Ussher =

Archdeacon of Armagh

Christopher Ussher, the uncle of Archbishop James Ussher, was Archdeacon of Armagh from 1591 until his death on 25 June 1597.
