= Richard St George Mansergh-St George =

British Army officer, landowner and magistrate

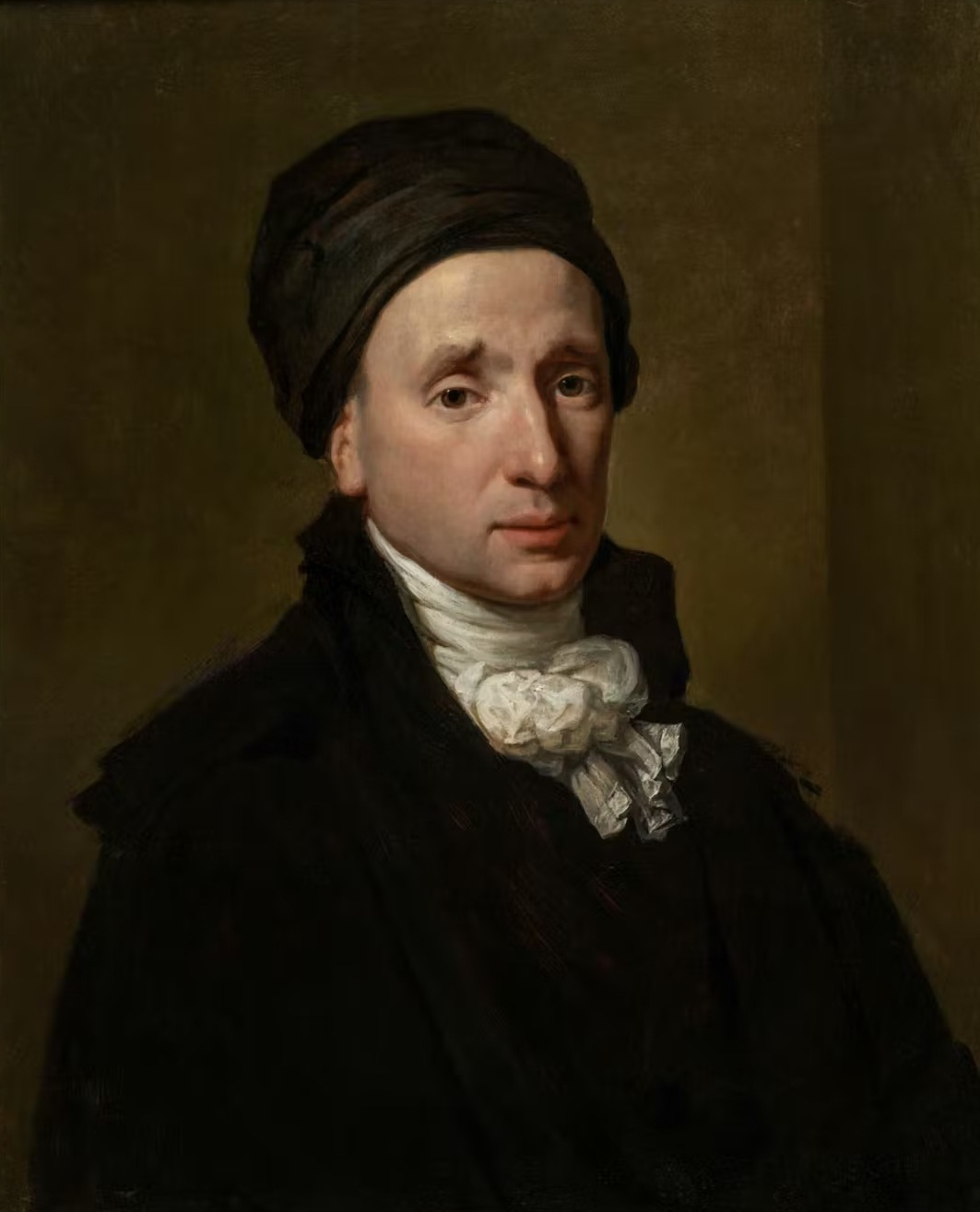
c. 1791 portrait of Mansergh-St George by Hugh Douglas Hamilton

Richard St George Mansergh-St George (born Richard St George Mansergh; c. 1752 – 12 February 1798) was a British Army officer, landowner and magistrate who served in the American War of Independence. Born in County Cork, Ireland, into an Anglo-Irish family, Mansergh-St George was murdered in the lead-up to the Irish Rebellion of 1798.

== Family ==
Born c. 1752, Richard St George Mansergh was the only son of James Mansergh, a soldier and landowner in County Cork. His maternal grandfather was Sir Richard St George, whose grandfather was Sir George St George of Carrickdrumrusk and ancestor to the Barons St George. The St Georges were originally from Cambridgeshire who were granted lands in the Headford area, in 1666, following the Cromwellian conquest of Ireland. Much of this land had was held by the Catholic Skerrett family. Their ownership of lands was extensive in the counties of Galway, Roscommon, Limerick and Queen's County (County Laois) confirmed by a patent dated 26 October 1666.

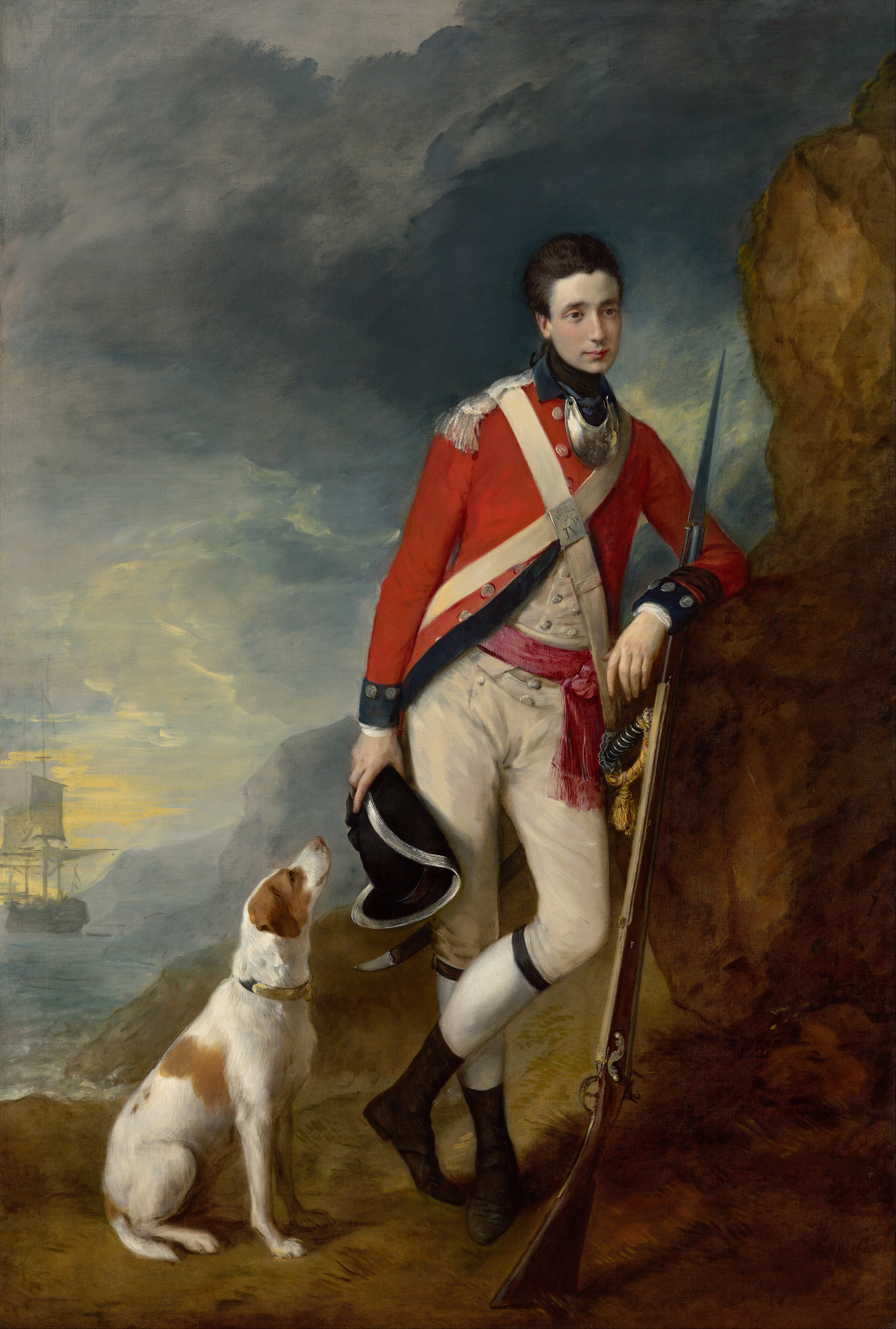
1776 portrait of Mansergh-St George by Thomas Gainsborough

== Education ==
He was educated at Westminster School before entering Middle Temple in 1769. He attended Trinity College, Cambridge from 1771 to 1775, graduating with a BA. He was friends with the painter Henry Fuseli and the poet Anna Seward. As an artist, he created sketches and watercolours which lampooned the political figures and events of the day. In 1771, he inherited his uncle's estate and added 'St. George' to the end of his surname.

== Military career during American Revolutionary War ==
He began his military career in late 1775 by purchasing a cornet's commission in the 8th (The King's Royal Irish) Regiment of (Light) Dragoons. After serving three months, he retired, but had signed up again by obtaining a position as an ensign in the 4th Regiment of Foot at the outbreak of the American War for Independence. His regiment joined General William Howe in the Battle of Long Island in 1776, and at Fort Washington. He eventually purchased a lieutenancy in the 52nd Regiment of Foot in December 1776. The following year, after lay-waying in Nova Scotia in early 1777, he participated in the Philadelphia campaign of 1777, seeing action at the Battle of Brandywine and the Battle of Germantown where he was shot in the head. He was trepanned (a portion of his skull was removed) and fitted with a silver plate to cover the hole, requiring St. George to perpetually wear a black silken cap. Xavier della Gatta’s painting of the Battle of Germantown depicts a fellow private, Corporal George Peacock, carrying the wounded St. George on his back from the battle. Mansergh-St George recounted "a most infernal fire of cannon and musket--smoak--incessant shouting--incline to the right! Incline to the Left!--halt!--charge!...the balls ploughing up the ground. The trees cracking over ones head, The branches riven by the artillery. The leaves falling as in autumn by grapeshot." He returned to New York in June 1778. He was eventually promoted to captain in the 44th Regiment of Foot in 1778. By the end of the war he was serving as an aid to Sir Henry Clinton. He exchanged that commission for the same rank in the 100th Regiment of Foot on 4 May 1785, only to finally retire from the regulars on 18 May.

== Return to Ireland and rebellion of 1798 ==
After being mustered out of the British Army in May 1785, St George returned to Ireland from America. In 1788, he married Anne Stepney of Durrow, County Laois (then Queen's County) and within three years they had two sons: Richard James and Stepney St George. Mansergh St George acted as a local magistrate and was reportedly appalled by the poverty that he found on his estates in County Cork and County Galway. He documented the conditions in an Account of the State of Affairs in and About Headford, County Galway. While, in the account, he laments the condition of the Irish peasantry and considers establishing a linen industry to improve matters, St George doubts the willingness and ability of his tenants to make the enterprise work.

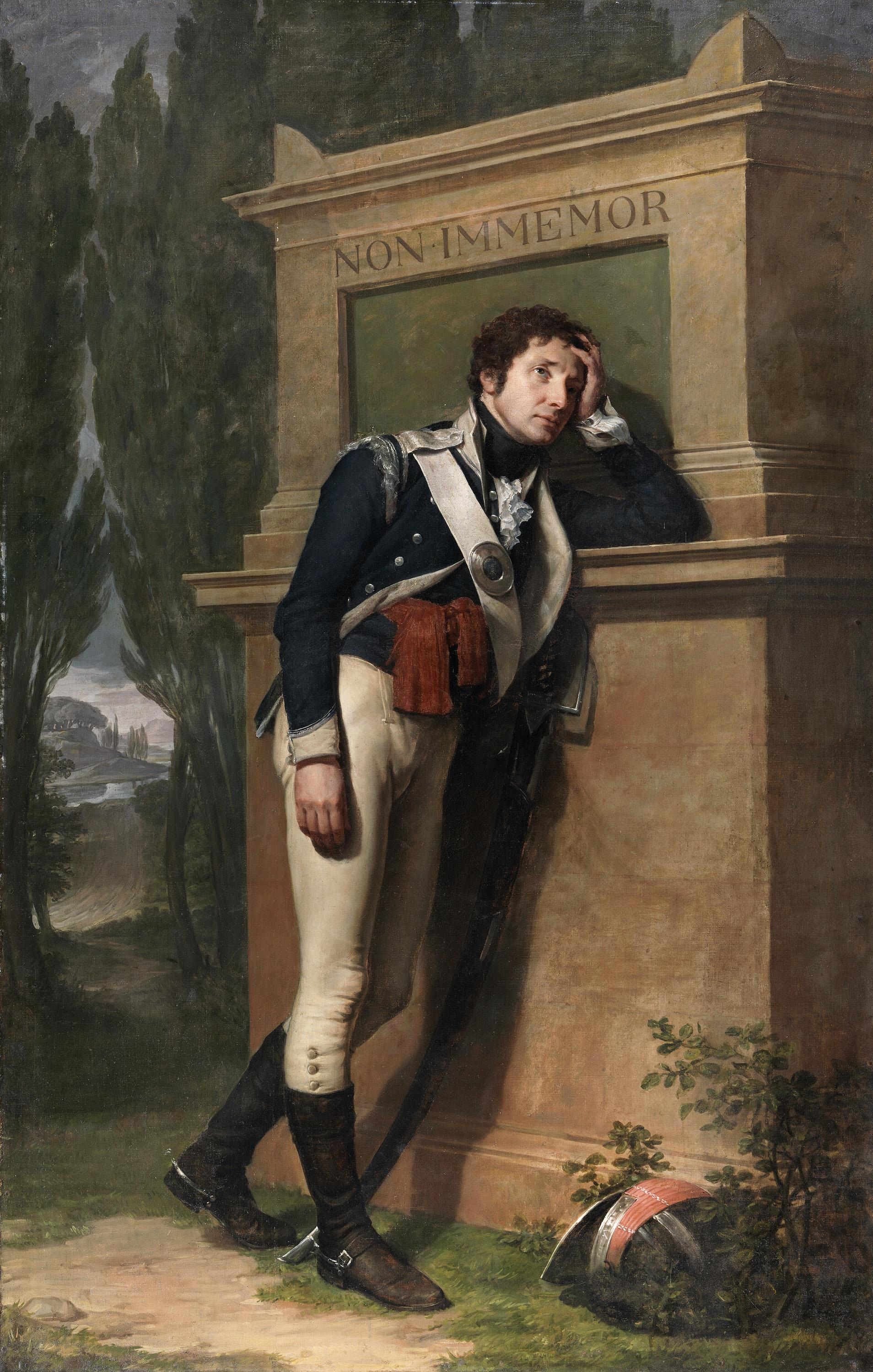
1796 portrait of Mansergh-St George mourning his wife's death by Hugh Douglas Hamilton

Mansergh St George's wife died in 1791, leaving him a widower with two infant children. He commissioned a portrait of himself as a monument to his grief for her. The result of this commission was a 1796 full-length portrait by Hugh Douglas Hamilton now in the National Gallery of Ireland, in which Mansergh St George, in his 18th Light Dragoons uniform, leans in an attitude of grief against a classical tomb inscribed Non Immemor.

By the late 1780s, St George was acting as the only magistrate in the largely mountainous area around the border between County Cork and County Tipperary. The local tenants had been cutting down trees for pike handles, as the landed gentry looked on in fear of a possible insurrection by their tenants. By the start of the 1798 Rebellion, St George had written a confidential letter to the Dublin Castle administration describing "a gentleman about a quarter of a mile from this passively observed the people cutting down fifty of his trees in Daylight in view of his house".

== Death ==
St George had been dining with the Earl of Mountcashel's at Moor Park, and expressing his views about his detestation of treason and rebellion. It is possible that a servant at Moor Park reported these discussions to members of the United Irishmen. On 12 February 1798, at the outbreak of the Irish Rebellion of 1798, thirty republicans from North Cork and South County Tipperary attacked the house of Jasper Uniacke, St George's tenant and administrator. And according to the Hibernian Chronicle, those attacking the house "demanded that St. George Mansergh, who was then in the house, should be sent out to them; this being refused, they rushed in to seize him, on which he shot one of them dead, which so exasperated the rest, that with pitchforks, and other weapons", was "barbarously murdered" along with his servant with a rusty scythe. The newspaper article continues to describe the murder: "And to add to their inhumanity, they wounded Mrs. Uniacke, while in the act of saving her husband, so that she lies dangerously ill". She survived and identified two of the assailants, John Haye and Timothy Hickey, at their trial later in 1798. Both men were found guilty and executed at Araglin.
