= Henry St George =

Sir Henry St George
- Born: 27 January 1581; Hatley St George, England, Kingdom of England
- Died: 5 November 1644 (aged 63); Oxford, England, Kingdom of England
- Occupations: Officer of arms Norroy King of Arms; Garter Principal King of Arms
- Spouse(s): Mary Dayrell (c.1614-1644)
- Children: Thomas, Henry, Frances, and 8 others
- Parent(s): Richard St George; Elizabeth St John

Sir Henry St George (27 January 1581 – 5 November 1644) was an English Officer of arms. He was the third (but eldest surviving) son of the herald Sir Richard St George and his wife Elizabeth St John.

== Life ==
He was born on 27 January 1581 at Hatley St George, Cambridgeshire. He entered the College of Arms as Rouge Rose pursuivant-extraordinary in 1610 and was promoted to Bluemantle Pursuivant the following year, in which capacity he accompanied his father in his visitations of Derbyshire and Cheshire. Around 1614, he married Mary, the daughter of Sir Thomas Dayrell of Lillingstone Dayrell, Buckinghamshire, with whom he had eleven children. He was promoted to Richmond Herald in 1616 and acted as William Camden's deputy for a number of visitations between 1619 and 1623. In 1625, he was sent to France to bring Queen Henrietta Maria to England, and in 1627 he was sent to Sweden to invest King Gustavus Adolphus as a Knight of the Garter, on which occasion he was knighted by the Swedish king, and granted an augmentation of honour consisting of the Swedish royal arms on a canton in his personal arms.

Between 1633 and 1635 he acted as his father's deputy for the visitation of London, and in the reorganization of the College of Arms following his father's death, he was appointed Norroy King of Arms. In April 1639 he was suspended and fined by the Earl Marshal for forging his father's signature on a faked grant of arms, but he was restored with a pardon under the great seal a year later. During the English Civil War he accompanied King Charles to Oxford, where he was appointed Garter Principal King of Arms to succeed Sir John Borough in 1644. He died at Brasenose College, Oxford, on 5 November 1644 and was buried in Christ Church Cathedral.

His sons Thomas and Henry became Garters in 1686 and 1703 respectively. Another son Richard became Ulster King of Arms in 1660.

== Arms ==
Coat of arms of Henry St George
Notes Same arms as his father Richard, who was Clarenceaux, but with an augmentation of the arms of Sweden granted by King Gustavus Adolphus by patent. Adopted 26 September 1627 Crest A demi-lion as in the Arms Escutcheon Argent, a chief azure & over all a lion rampant gules crowned or (as his father) On a canton or, an escutcheon azure charged with 3 crowns or (Sweden). Motto Firmitas in Coelo ("Stability in Heaven")

Heraldic offices
Preceded by John Borough	Garter Principal King of Arms; 1643–1644	Succeeded by Edward Bysshe
