= Thomas St George =

Sir Thomas St George
- Born: 1615; England, Kingdom of England
- Died: 6 March 1703 (aged 87–88); England, Kingdom of England
- Occupation: Officer of arms
- Children: 6
- Parent: Henry St George
- Relatives: Henry St George, the younger (brother)

Sir Thomas St George (1615 – 6 March 1703) was an English officer of arms who rose to the rank of Garter Principal King of Arms (1686–1703).

== Life ==
He was the eldest child of the herald Sir Henry St George and his wife, Mary Dayrell, daughter of Sir Thomas Dayrell. He lived at Woodford in Essex. Around 1646, he married Clara Pymlowe (d. 1691), whose father, John Pymlowe, was a Northamptonshire rector. They had six children, including Thomas junior, who was Vicar of Bexley, and Eleanor, who married the eminent Irish judge Thomas Coote.

At the Restoration he was appointed Somerset Herald. As deputy to Sir Edward Walker, he went on a mission to Dresden and invested John George II, Elector of Saxony on 13 April 1669 with the Order of the Garter. He was knighted in 1669 and appointed Norroy King of Arms in 1680, in succession to his younger brother Henry. The seniority was reversed when in 1686, he was appointed Garter on the death of William Dugdale. In 1690 he appointed a deputy to deliver the Garter to a Continental recipient, but the following year he undertook the task himself as William III was to attend the ceremony. In 1693, Gregory King acted as his deputy to deliver the Garter to the Elector of Saxony. On his return to London in May 1693 he was knighted.

Following his first wife's death, he married Anne (d. 1721), daughter of Sir John Lawson and widow of William Attwood in 1692. Their only daughter Isabella died in infancy. In 1693, he and his brother Sir Henry were appointed commissioners for the rebuilding of St Paul's Cathedral after the Great Fire of London. He died at the College of Arms on 6 March 1703 and was buried at Woodford. His manuscripts were purchased by Peter Le Neve, Norroy King of Arms. According to Mark Noble, "he died more esteemed as a good, and more respected as an elegant man, than praised for his knowledge".

His estates passed to his granddaughter Eleanor, who was the only child of his son Thomas and his wife Damaris Renter. She married Thomas Dare of Taunton.

== Arms ==
Coat of arms of Thomas St George
Notes Same arms as his father Adopted 26 September 1627 Crest A demi-lion as in the Arms Escutcheon Argent, a chief azure & over all a lion rampant gules crowned or (St George) On a canton or, an escutcheon azure charged with 3 crowns or (Sweden). Motto Firmitas in Coelo ("Stability in Heaven")
