= Richard St George =

17th century English officer (c. 1550 – 1635)

Sir Richard St George
- Born: c. 1550; England, Kingdom of England
- Died: 1635 (aged c. 85); England, Kingdom of England
- Occupations: Officer of arms Clarenceux King of Arms
- Spouse: Elizabeth St John (m. 1575)
- Children: Henry and George

Sir Richard St George (c. 1550 – 1635) was a long-serving officer of arms at the College of Arms in London during the seventeenth century.

== Life ==
He was the second son of Francis St George (d. 1584) of Hatley, Cambridgeshire. In 1575 he married Elizabeth, daughter of Nicholas St John of Lydiard Tregoze, Wiltshire. Elizabeth was a descendant of Margaret Beauchamp, grandmother to Henry VII. He was a collector of manuscripts and keen antiquary, associated with the Elizabethan Society of Antiquaries. He joined the College of Arms in 1602. During this year, he was unsuccessful in his bid to be appointed Norroy King of Arms, but he later became Berwick Pursuivant of Arms in Ordinary and then Windsor Herald of Arms in Ordinary. In 1604, St George was finally able to secure an appointment as Norroy and was knighted in 1616. In 1623, he attained the position of Clarenceux King of Arms, the second-highest heraldic appointment in England. He was active in all of the posts to which he was appointed until his death. He carried out numerous visitations during his tenure and was a noted scholar and antiquarian.

Richard St George died in 1635 and is buried in St Andrew's church, Holborn. The family bore a coat of arms blazoned Argent a Chief Azure overall a Lion rampant Gules crowned Or.

== Issue ==
Richard St George was the head of a noted heraldic family. His son Henry became Garter Principal King of Arms in 1645 and the latter’s two sons, Thomas and Henry became Garters in 1686 and 1703 respectively.

Richard St George's second son, Sir George St George of Carrickdrumrusk had three sons (Oliver, George and Charles) and was an ancestor of the Barons St George. Another son, Richard, was an ancestor of the St Georges of Woodsgift in County Kilkenny.

== Arms ==
Coat of arms of Richard St George
Crest A demi-lion as in the Arms. Escutcheon Argent, a chief azure & over all a lion rampant gules crowned or. Motto Firmitas in Coelo
