= Ordinary of arms =

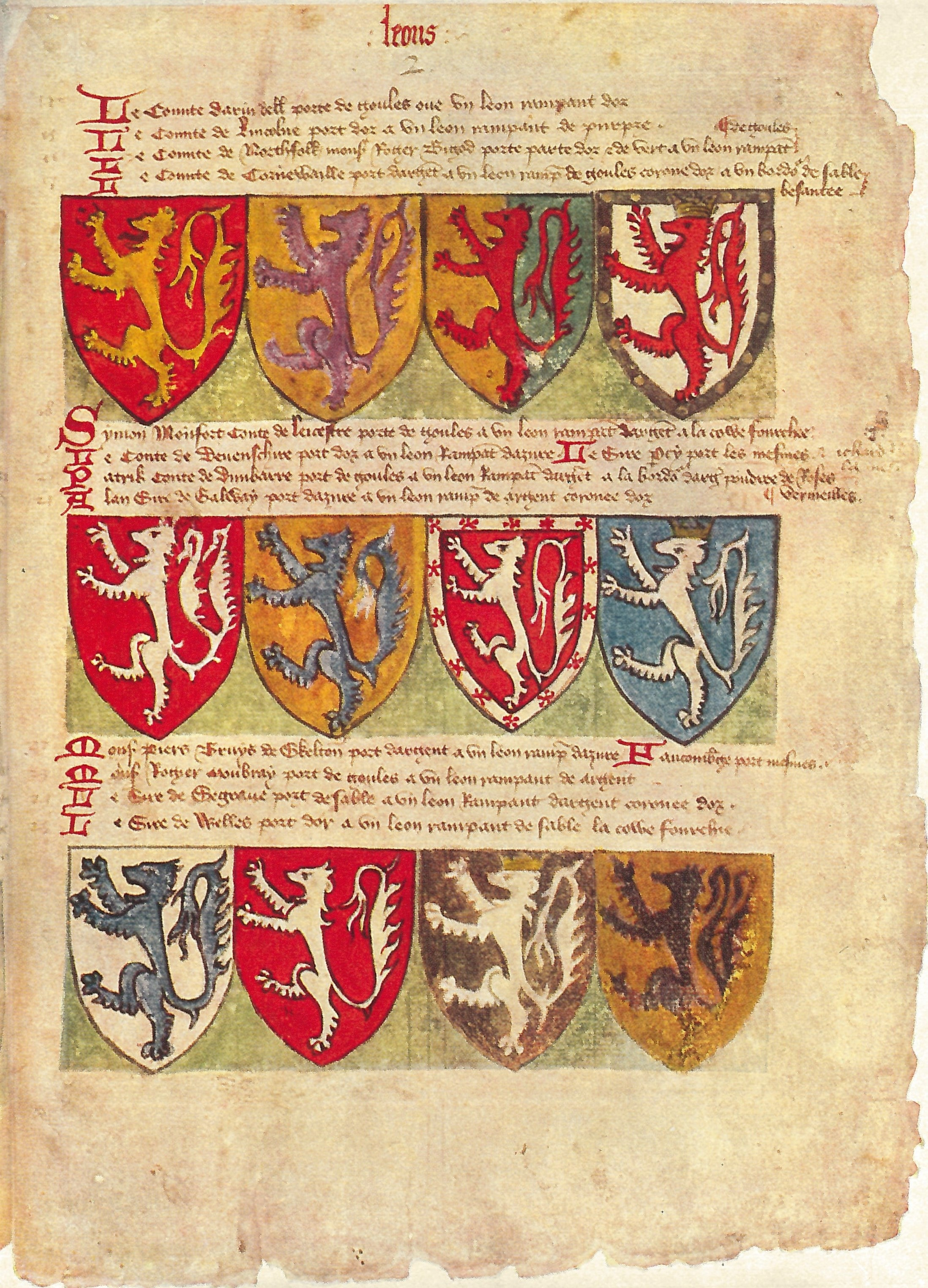
Thomas Jenyns' Book, an English ordinary of arms compiled in c.1398. This page shows a sequence of coats of arms featuring lions rampant. British Library, Add. MS 40851.

An ordinary of arms (or simply an ordinary) is a roll or register of coats of arms arranged systematically by design, with coats featuring the same principal elements (geometrical ordinaries and charges) grouped together. The purpose of an ordinary is to facilitate the identification of the bearer of a coat of arms from visual evidence alone.

Ordinaries may take a form which is either graphic (consisting of a series of painted or drawn images of shields) or textual (consisting of blazons – verbal descriptions – of the coats). Most medieval and early modern manuscript ordinaries were graphic, whereas all the principal modern published ordinaries have been textual. A knowledge of the technicalities of blazon is essential for the student hoping to make best use of a textual ordinary.

By extension, ordinaries may also be compiled of other elements of heraldic display, such as crests, supporters or badges.

== Etymology ==
Although ordinaries of arms have been compiled since the 14th century, the actual term seems to have come into use only in the 18th century. The earliest clear attestation is found in Edmondson's Complete Body of Heraldry of 1780. The derivation of the term is unclear. It may have originated in the form "ordinary book" or "book of ordinaries", meaning a collection of (geometrical) ordinaries and subordinaries, the simple figures and shapes that form the basis of many coats of arms. Alternatively, it may have arisen by analogy with a liturgical ordinary, an authoritative book containing the order of divine service.

== Medieval and early modern ordinaries ==
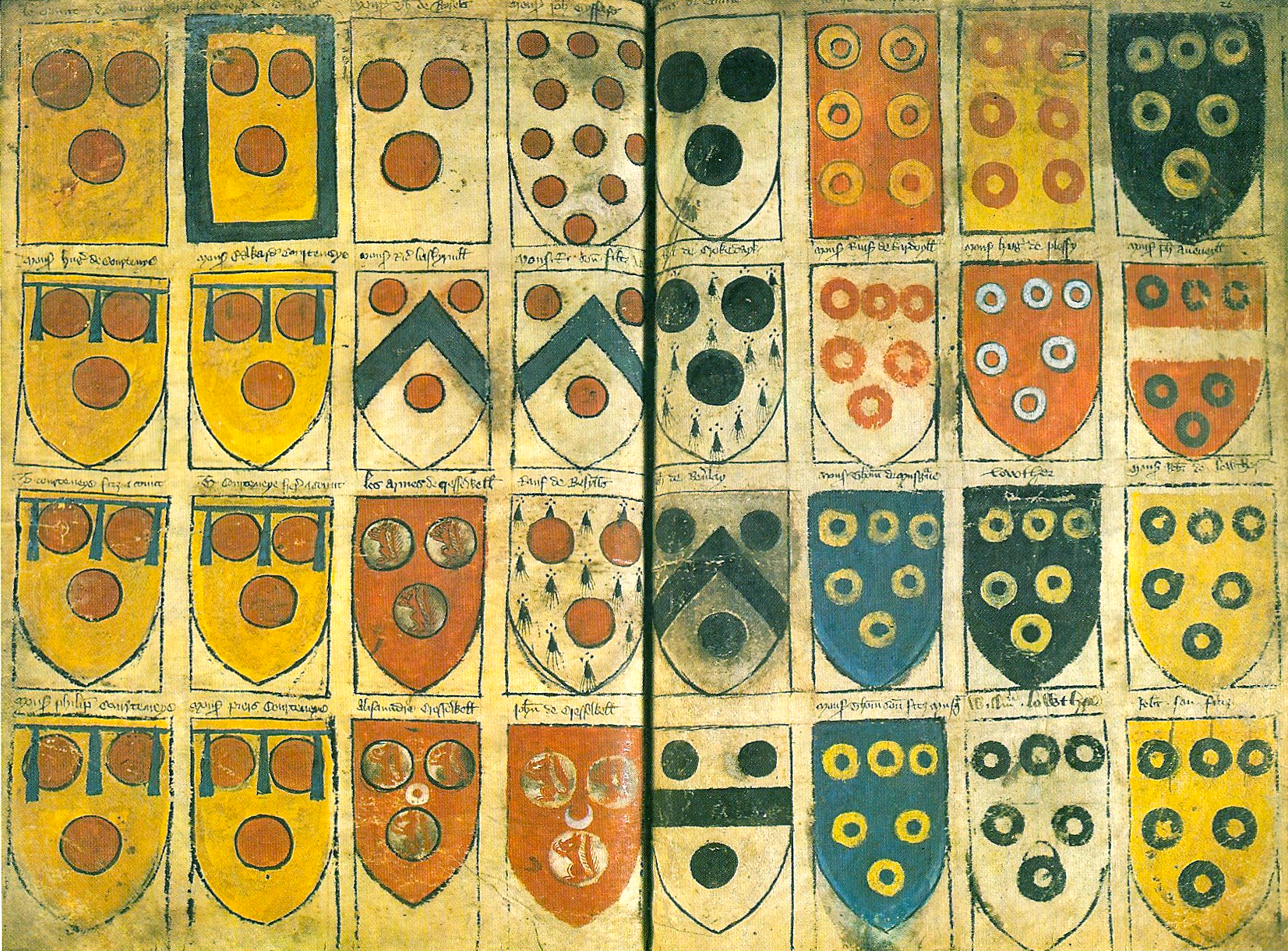
Extract from William Jenyn's Ordinary of c.1360, showing two pages of arms featuring roundels and annulets

The ordinary appears to have been an English development of the 14th century. No medieval ordinaries are known from continental Europe.

Medieval English ordinaries include "Cooke's Ordinary", compiled in c.1340 (644 coats), "Cotgrave's Ordinary", also of c.1340 but in blazon (556 coats), and the larger "Thomas Jenyns' Book", compiled in c.1398 (1,595 coats). These three are all related, and perhaps derive from a lost progenitor. An independent work is "William Jenyns' Ordinary", compiled in c.1360 (1,612 coats).

In the early 16th century, Thomas Wriothesley, Garter King of Arms, planned a comprehensive painted roll and ordinary of all English arms: this was not completed, but parts of the ordinary survive in what is now known as "Prince Arthur's Book" of c.1520. In the second half of the century, Robert Glover, Somerset Herald, drew on a wide range of medieval sources to compile "Glover's Ordinary", the fullest and most authoritative ordinary to date. This was assembled in its first form in 1584, and contained some 15,000 coats. At the beginning of the 17th century, Augustine Vincent, Rouge Croix Pursuivant and later Windsor Herald, compiled "Vincent's Ordinary", also of about 15,000 shields, drawn in trick.

Versions of Glover's Ordinary, much augmented, were published in Joseph Edmondson's Complete Body of Heraldry (1780) and in William Berry's Encyclopedia Heraldica (1828). Cotgrave's Ordinary was published in 1829, edited by Sir Harris Nicolas.

== Modern ordinaries ==
=== Papworth ===
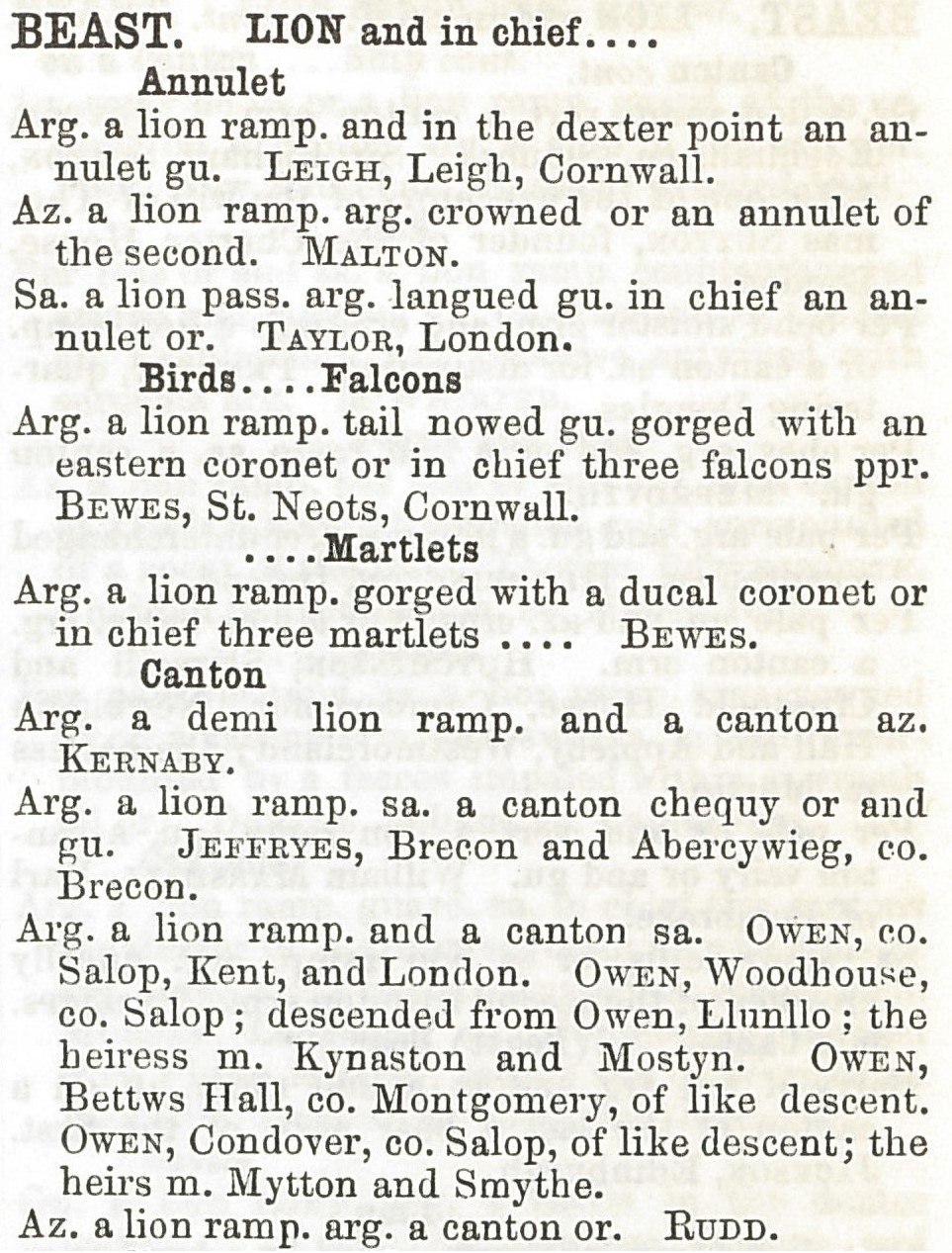
Extract from Papworth's Ordinary (1874)

The principal modern ordinary of British and Irish heraldry, still not entirely superseded, is "Papworth's Ordinary" (1874), or in full An Alphabetical Dictionary of Coats of Arms belonging to Families in Great Britain and Ireland, forming an extensive Ordinary of British Armorials upon an entirely new plan, compiled by John Woody Papworth. Papworth began work in 1847, making extensive use of Burke's General Armory (first published 1842; third edition with supplement 1847), copying its entries – which were arranged alphabetically by surname – onto slips of paper and rearranging them. He published a prospectus in 1857, and began to issue his work in instalments shortly afterwards: nine parts had appeared by 1863, and fourteen by the time of his early death (apparently hastened by his insistent commitment to work on the project) in 1870. By this point the work had proceeded as far as page 696: the remaining 429 pages were edited and brought to completion from Papworth's materials by Alfred William Morant (1828–1881). The Ordinary, containing about 50,000 entries, was published as a complete volume in 1874. It rapidly established itself as a standard work of reference, and was reprinted in 1961, 1977 and 1985.

The great strength of Papworth's Ordinary was the rigorousness of its system of classification by blazon, which (with minor modifications) has remained the basis for all ordinaries published since: there was only one possible place for any particular coat of arms to be entered within it. Its weakness was its dependence for its contents on Burke's General Armory and other secondary sources, which meant that it inherited many of their errors and omissions. One of the idiosyncrasies of the book (and therefore of some of its successors), which resulted in part from Papworth's decision to classify animal charges of all kinds under the primary heading "Beast", and birds of all kinds under "Bird", is that the alphabetical distribution of entries is highly unbalanced: the headings A–F account for roughly 80% of the whole, a point on which the editor had to reassure subscribers while the work was still in progress.

=== Dictionary of British Arms ===
In 1926 Lt Col George Babington Croft Lyons left a substantial bequest to the Society of Antiquaries to prepare a revised and improved edition of Papworth. Anthony Wagner became co-general editor in 1940 and sole general editor in 1944, remaining in that position until 1995. A number of volunteers were recruited (some of them, during the war years, working in inactive periods of firewatching duties) to assemble material on index cards. However, the task was a large one and progress slow, in part because of Wagner's insistence on high scholarly standards and use of primary sources, and in part because of over-ambitious plans to include in the final work a series of essays on medieval armorial families. It was eventually decided to limit the project to England, to the medieval period (pre-1530), and to publish a simple ordinary, including a name-index but without the additional essays. With the aid of computer technology, the first volume of what was now entitled the Dictionary of British Arms appeared in 1992. Volume 2 was published in 1996, volume 3 in 2009, and volume 4 (the final volume) in 2014.

=== Scotland ===
An Ordinary of Arms for Scotland, edited by Sir James Balfour Paul, Lord Lyon King of Arms, was published in 1893, with a second updated edition appearing in 1903: this includes all arms recorded in the Public Register of All Arms and Bearings in Scotland from its inception in 1672 down to the end of 1901 (5,532 entries, with a name index). A second volume, covering arms entered in the Register from 1902 to 1973 (a further 6,040 entries), was published in 1977: this was edited by David Reid of Robertland, Carrick Pursuivant, and Vivien Wilson.

An Ordinary Volume III is now available, of Arms contained in the Public Register of All Arms and Bearings in Scotland, covering 1971-2017: Vol. 55 (1971) to Vol. 91 (2017) and part of Vol. 92, Compiled, and with an Introduction and other material, by Dr. Bruce Durie and with a Foreword by The Rt. Hon. The Lord Lyon, The Revd. Canon Dr. Joseph John Morrow.

There is also a Companion to the Ordinary of Arms vol III compiled by Dr Bruce Durie, dedicated to Crests, Mottos, Supporters, Flags and Badges associated with the Arms in the Ordinary Volume III along with informative essays and other material, and a Foreword by bthe noted Scots heraldist, Mark Dennis.

An Ordinary of Scottish Arms from Original pre-1672 Manuscripts, edited by Eilean Malden, John Malden (sometime Unicorn Pursuivant, now Slains Pursuivant) and William G. Scott, was published in 2016. This contains both an armory (arranged alphabetically by surname) and an ordinary of some 25,000 coats of arms, drawing on the evidence of medieval rolls of arms and other pre-1672 manuscript sources, but excluding that of seals.

=== Wales ===
"An Ordinary of Welsh Arms", covering Welsh arms, crests, badges and supporters down to c.1630 (about 2,800 entries and a name index) forms the greater part of volume 3 of The Development of Welsh Heraldry by Michael Powell Siddons, published in 1993. A supplementary ordinary down to c.1700 (a further 1,200 entries) is included in volume 4, published in 2006.

=== Suffolk ===
A Dictionary of Suffolk Arms edited by Joan Corder (an ordinary of arms, containing about 6,700 entries and a name-index) was published by the Suffolk Records Society in 1965. A companion volume by the same editor, A Dictionary of Suffolk Crests (containing some 25,000 entries for crests, arranged in "ordinary" form, together with a name-index), was published by the same society in 1998.

=== "Garter's Ordinaries" ===
An important modern unpublished ordinary is the collection known as "Garter's Ordinaries", now held at the College of Arms. This was originally compiled by and under the direction of Sir Albert Woods, Garter King of Arms, between 1842 and his death in 1904, and was then donated to the College by his grandson, Gerald Woods Wollaston. At that time it comprised two series, one of five and the other of six volumes, plus indexes. Subsequent Garters have added to the series and kept the ordinary up to date by including within it new grants of arms. The ordinary remains in use by the members of the College, both for identifying old coats of arms, and for ensuring that new grants are sufficiently differenced from existing coats.

== Bibliography ==
- Campbell, Louise; Steer, Francis (1988). A Catalogue of Manuscripts in the College of Arms Collections: Volume 1. London: College of Arms. ISBN 0-9506980-1-6.
- Collins, S. M. (1942). "Papworth and his Ordinary". Antiquaries Journal. 22: 3–16. doi:10.1017/s0003581500003668. S2CID 161716978.
- Fox, Paul A. (2006). "Fourteenth-century ordinaries of arms: Part 1: Thomas Jenyns' Book and its precursors". Coat of Arms. 3rd ser. 2: 97–102.
- Fox, Paul A. (2009). "Fourteenth-century ordinaries of arms: Part 2: William Jenyns' Ordinary". Coat of Arms. 3rd ser. 5: 55–64.
- Wagner, Anthony Richard (1950). A Catalogue of English Medieval Rolls of Arms. Aspilogia. Vol. 1. Oxford: Society of Antiquaries.
- Wagner, Anthony Richard (1957). Rolls of Arms: Henry III. Aspilogia. Vol. 2. Oxford: Society of Antiquaries.
- Wagner, Anthony (1952). The Records and Collections of the College of Arms. London: Burke's Peerage.
- Woodcock, Thomas; Robinson, John Martin (1988). The Oxford Guide to Heraldry. Oxford: Oxford University Press. ISBN 0-19-211658-4.
