= Charles Young (officer of arms) =

English officer of arms

Sir Charles Young
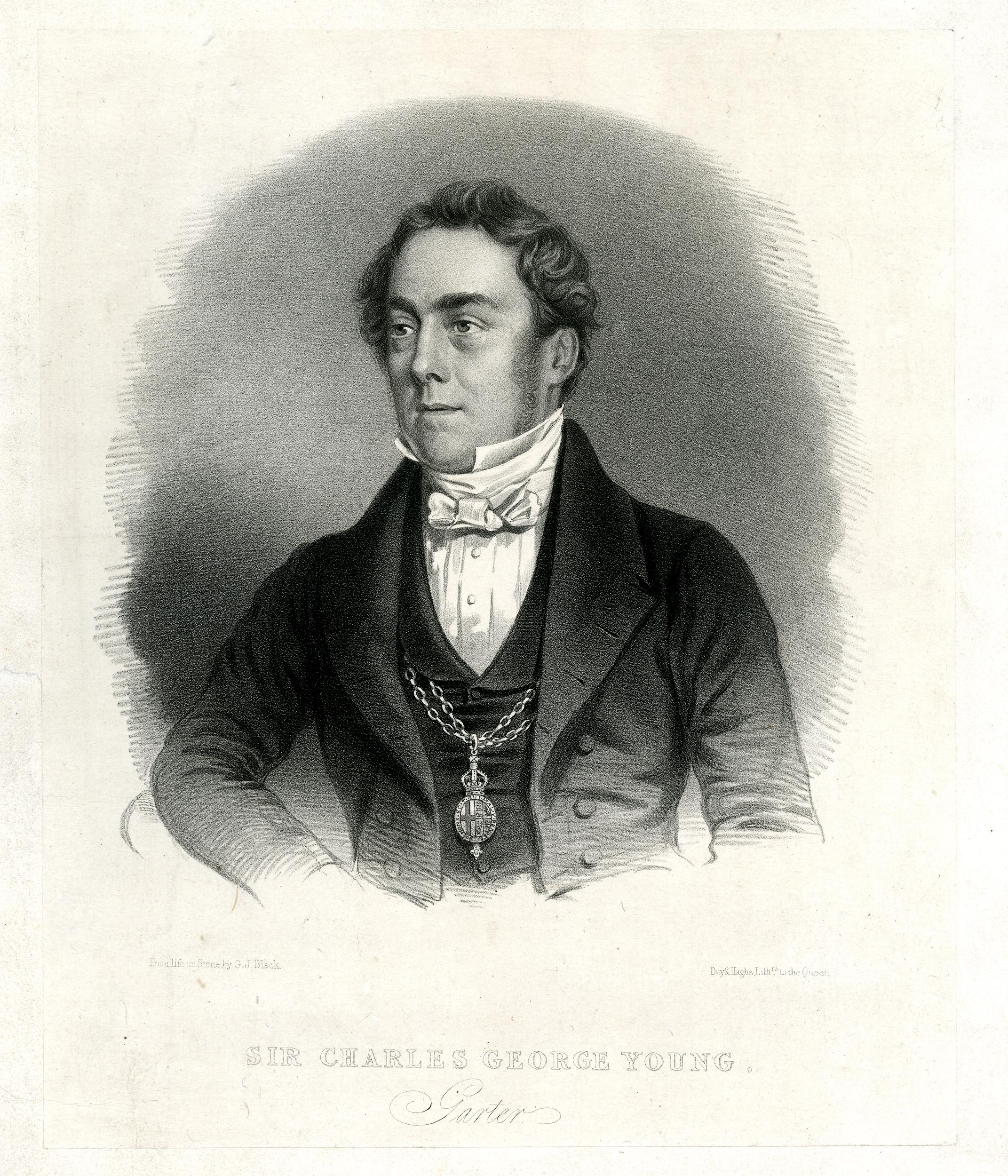

Garter Principal King of Arms
- In office 1842–1869
- Monarch: Victoria
- Preceded by: Sir William Woods
- Succeeded by: Sir Albert Woods

Personal details
- Born: 6 April 1795
- Died: 31 August 1869 (aged 74)

Sir Charles George Young (1795–1869) was an English officer of arms. He served in the heraldic office of Garter King of Arms, the senior member of the College of Arms in England, from 1842 until his death in 1869.

== Life ==
Born on 6 April 1795, he was the son of Jonathan Young, a physician who practised in Lambeth. He was educated at Charterhouse School, where he was a contemporary of Connop Thirlwall, George Grote, and Henry and William Havelock. His mother, Mary Waring, was an illegitimate daughter of Charles Howard, 11th Duke of Norfolk, and so he was educated under the sponsorship of the Howard family.

In 1813 he entered the College of Arms as Rouge Dragon Pursuivant, and became York Herald in 1820. Two years later he was appointed to the registrarship of the college. His appointment, on 6 August 1842, as Garter principal king-of-arms, in succession to Sir William Woods, and in conformity with custom he was knighted (28 August). His cousin Edward Howard Howard-Gibbon succeeded him in his old post.

While still York Herald he was employed as secretary to the missions for investing the kings of Denmark, Portugal, and France with the blue riband of the Order of the Garter in 1822, 1823, and 1825. In his capacity as Garter King he was sent as joint-commissioner to invest the king of Saxony in 1842, the sultan of Turkey in 1856, the king of Portugal in 1858, the king of Denmark in 1865, and the king of the Belgians in 1866. His last public employment was that of joint-commissioner to Vienna in 1867 to confer the insignia of the Garter on the emperor of Austria.

Young was elected Fellow of the Society of Antiquaries on 21 March 1822, and was created D.C.L. by the University of Oxford on 28 June 1854. He died at his house in Prince's Terrace, Hyde Park, on 31 August 1869.

He married Frances Susannah, youngest daughter of Samuel Lovick Cooper and widow of Frederick Tyrrell, but left no issue. By his will he appointed his brother Henry, barrister-at-law, and his nephew Francis, residuary legatees.

== Works ==
Young wrote a number of books and pamphlets in the course of his service, including Catalogue of the Arundel Manuscripts in the College of Arms in 1829, and The Order of Precedence in 1851. His contributions to heraldic literature were all privately printed. They include:

- 'Catalogue of Works on the Peerage ... of England, Scotland, and Ireland in the Library of C. G. Young, York Herald,’ 1826.
- Catalogue of the Arundel Manuscripts in the Library of the College of Arms, London: S. & R. Bentley, 1829.
- 'An Account of the Controversy between Reginald, Lord Grey of Ruthyn, and Sir Edward Hastings in the Court of Chivalry in the Reign of Henry IV,’ 1841.
- 'The Order of Precedence, with Authorities and Remarks,’ 1851.
- 'Privy Councillors and their Precedence,’ 1860.
- 'The Lord Lieutenant and High Sheriff and their Precedence,’ 1860.
- 'Ornaments and Gifts consecrated by the Roman Pontiffs: the Golden Rose, the Cap and the Sword,’ 1860. He shows that the rose was presented to Henry VI, Mary, and Henrietta Maria, the sword to Edward IV and to Henry VII, while Henry VIII was the recipient of both gifts on more occasions than one.

In October 1835 Young drew up a report on grievances of the baronets: claims to the title of honourable, to supporters, and to dark-green apparel, with thumb-ring, SS collar, and a white hat and plume. This report was printed for private circulation; from its pages Benjamin Disraeli derived the colouring for his portrait of Sir Vavasour, who dilates on the wrongs of his order in Sybil (1845). Young was a contributor to Notes and Queries,’ and assisted Richard Griffin, 3rd Baron Braybrooke in his edition of Pepys's Diary.

== Arms ==
Coat of arms of Charles Young
Notes Sometimes quartered for his mother: Per fess gules & argent, a pale counterchanged & 3 crosses crosslet, 2 & 1, argent, all in a border gobony or & azure (granted 15 December 1825). Adopted 26 June 1822 Crest On a wreath of the colours in water representing the sea an anchor erect sable, ring & stock or, the shank entwined by a serpent proper. Escutcheon Ermine, on a bend between 2 eagles displayed sable an anchor argent between 3 griffin heads erased or. Motto Nullius in Verba ("On the word of no one") Previous versions As Rouge Dragon; granted to his father 14 May 1804; ermine, on a bend between 2 eagles displayed sable an anchor argent between 2 griffin heads erased or, a label for difference. Motto: Nil Humani a me Alienum Puto. 2nd crest, granted to Rouge Dragon 15 December 1817; on a wreath argent & sable a dragon couchant, wings elevated gules collared & chained or, in the mouth a rose per pale gules & argent seeded or & slipped proper.
