= Mowbray Herald Extraordinary =

Mowbray Herald of Arms Extraordinary was an English officer of arms. From the time of King Richard II to that of Henry VI, Mowbray was the Duke of Norfolk's private herald. Since its revival in 1623 the title has always been given to a herald extraordinary. Though an officer of the crown, Mowbray Herald Extraordinary was not a member of the corporation of the College of Arms in London. Sir William le Neve appears to have been appointed to the office from 29 June 1624 until his appointment as York Herald the following year. The office was recreated in January 1695 for Robert Plot, who was made Registrar of the College of Heralds just two days later and was subsequently held by Joseph Edmondson.

== Holders of the office ==
Arms	Name	Date of appointment	Ref
Herald of the Duke of Norfolk
	John ...	(1393)	
	... Reynold	(1398)	
	John Couson	(1416)	
	Giles Waster	(1420)	
	John Horsley	(Henry VI)	
	Giles Fraunceys	(1425)	
	Giles Steker or Steyker	(1435)	
	William Baker	(1455)	
Herald Extraordinary
	John Borough	June 1623	
	William Le Neve	29 June 1624	
	Francis Burghill	24 May 1677	
	Patrick Buchanan	9 November 1681	
	Robert Plot	2 February 1695	
	Rowland Fryth	17 May 1698	
	John Dugdale	17 June 1713	
	Joseph Edmondson	21 January 1764	
	Edward Howard-Gibbon	25 April 1842	

== See also ==
- Heraldry
- Herald
- Robert Plot
- Officer of Arms
