= James Pulman =

English officer of arms

Arms of James Pulman, granted 1822: Paly of six pieces or and vair, on a chief gules three boar heads erased argent.

James Pulman FSA (bapt. 4 June 1783 – 29 October 1859) was an English officer of arms.

Pulman was born in Ottery St Mary, Devon, the son of Thomas and Susannah Pulman. In 1820, married Harriet May Walker, who died 22 April 1828. They had two sons, James Heard Pulman (1821–1900), a barrister who served as House of Lords Librarian, and Thomas Walter Pulman (1822–1897).

Pulman held the offices of Portcullis Pursuivant (1822–1838), Richmond Herald (1838–1846), Norroy King of Arms (1846–1848), and Clarenceux King of Arms (1848–1859). He was also Yeoman Usher of the Black Rod at the time of his death.

He was elected a Fellow of the Society of Antiquaries in 1812.

Pulman died at his home in East Hill, Wandsworth, aged 76.

Heraldic offices
Preceded by George Frederick Beltz	Portcullis Pursuivant; 1822–1838	Succeeded by Sir Albert Woods
Preceded by Joseph Hawker	Richmond Herald; 1838–1846	Succeeded by Matthew Howard-Gibbon
Preceded by Francis Martin	Norroy King of Arms; 1846–1848	Succeeded by Edward Howard-Gibbon
Preceded by Francis Martin	Clarenceux King of Arms; 1848–1859	Succeeded by Robert Laurie
