= Amelia Frances Howard-Gibbon =

English teacher and artist (1826 –1874)

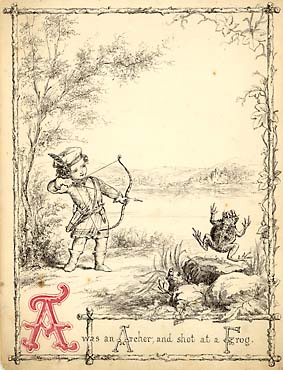
- A from Howard-Gibbon's An Illustrated Comic Alphabet
- Born: 24 July 1826; Littlehampton, Sussex, England
- Died: February 16, 1874 (aged 47); Lambeth, London, England
- Occupations: Artist, educator
- Writing career
- Genre: Children's Literature

Amelia Frances Howard-Gibbon (24 July 1826 – 6 February 1874) was an English teacher and artist known for her talents during the 1860s in Ontario, Canada. In 1966, her most comprehensive work, An Illustrated Comic Alphabet, was published by librarians and artists who admired her work. Five years later, the Canadian Library Association inaugurated an annual award named for her, Amelia Frances Howard-Gibbon Illustrator's Award. It recognizes the year's best illustration by a Canadian illustrator of a children's book published in Canada.

== Biography ==
Born at Littlehampton, Sussex, England, Howard-Gibbon was the oldest daughter of Amelia Dendy and Edward Howard-Gibbon, himself the illegitimate son of Charles Howard, 11th Duke of Norfolk. She was educated in private schools during the employment of her father at the College of Arms. From her earliest years, Howard-Gibbon enjoyed drawing freehand sketches, some of which survive today. She is believed to have studied French, German, and Art while in Paris, France, and Stuttgart, Germany. She was the first of the Howard-Gibbon siblings to emigrate to Ontario, where she began teaching in St. Thomas. She later moved to Sarnia and continued to teach children there for many years. From a family letter, she then taught in an art school in New York before she moved back to England in 1873, to claim an inheritance from her uncle Matthew Howard-Gibbon, and became ill. She died in Lambeth and was buried with her father at Saint Nicholas Churchyard in Arundel.

During Howard-Gibbon's time in Ontario, she created watercolor portraits and sketches of several friends and family members. In 1859 she sketched a children's alphabet book which she later gave to a friend, Martha Poussette. Many years later Poussette's family donated the book to the Toronto Children's Library. (The original is in the Osborne Collection of Early Children's Books, catalogued as a book, "25 leaves", under 24 "ART" call numbers whose last words are letters of the alphabet, A to Z except I and U.) It was finally published in 1966 as An Illustrated Comic Alphabet by Oxford University Press in Toronto (catalogued as a 31-page book) and Henry Z. Walck in New York. It is the earliest known children's picture book by a Canadian artist.

== Bibliography ==
- St. John, Judith (1966). "About Miss Howard-Gibbon and her Illustrated Comic Alphabet". An Illustrated Comic Alphabet Designed by Amelia Frances Howard Gibbon 1859. Toronto: Oxford U Press.
