= Albert Woods =

English officer of arms

Sir Albert Woods GCVO KCB KCMG KStJ FSA
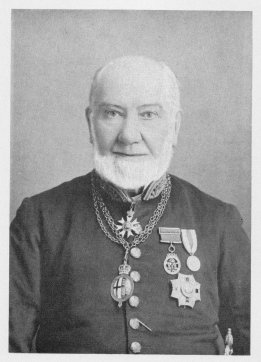

Garter Principal King of Arms
- In office 1869–1904
- Monarchs: Victoria; Edward VII
- Preceded by: Sir Charles Young
- Succeeded by: Sir Alfred Scott-Gatty

Personal details
- Born: 16 April 1816
- Died: 7 January 1904 (aged 87)

Sir Albert William Woods GCVO KCB KCMG KStJ FSA (16 April 1816 – 7 January 1904) was an English officer of arms, who served as Garter Principal King of Arms from 1869 to 1904. The Woods family has a strong tradition of service at the College of Arms. Albert Woods was the son of Sir William Woods, Garter King of Arms from 1838 until his death in 1842. Likewise, the grandson of Albert Woods was Sir Gerald Woods Wollaston, who also rose to the rank of Garter King of Arms and served there from 1930 until 1944.

== Heraldic career ==
Woods' first heraldic appointment came in 1837 when he served as Fitzalan Pursuivant of Arms Extraordinary at the coronation of Queen Victoria. In 1838 Woods became a member of the chapter of the College of Arms when he was appointed Portcullis Pursuivant of Arms in Ordinary. After a short appointment as Norfolk Herald of Arms Extraordinary, Woods was promoted to the office of Lancaster Herald of Arms in Ordinary in 1841. He held this position until 1869, when he was appointed Garter Principal King of Arms, a position he held until his death 35 years later.

From 1866, Woods was registrar of the College of Arms. At his appointment as Garter Principal King of Arms, he was also named the King of Arms of the Order of St Michael and St George. In 1878, he was made registrar of the Order of the Star of India and the Order of the Indian Empire. He officiated at the coronations both of Queen Victoria and of Edward VII.

Woods's eye for heraldic design has been deprecated by some heraldists. In his Complete Guide to Heraldry, Arthur Fox-Davies refers to his designs as "wretched", "unsuitable" and "abortions". He is particularly critical of the crests granted by Woods, which frequently incorporated tree trunks, either in front of the crest or underneath it, a practice Davies considered unheraldic.

== "Garter's Ordinaries" ==
Woods was responsible for the compilation of the important unpublished ordinary of arms (a systematic register of coats of arms) known as "Garter's Ordinaries". He began work on it in 1842 and continued until his death in 1904. By that date the ordinary comprised two series, one of five and the other of six volumes, plus indexes. Following his death it was donated to the College of Arms by his grandson, Gerald Woods Wollaston: since then, subsequent Garter Kings of Arms have added to it and kept it up to date by including within it new grants of arms. It remains in use: Sir Anthony Wagner has described it as "an indispensable tool at the College".

== Honours and appointments ==
- 1837 – Fitzalan Pursuivant of Arms Extraordinary
- 1838 – Portcullis Pursuivant of Arms in Ordinary
- 1841 – Norfolk Herald of Arms Extraordinary
- 1841 – Lancaster Herald of Arms in Ordinary
- 1869 – Knight Bachelor
- 1869 – Garter Principal King of Arms
- 1897 – Knight Commander of the Order of the Bath
- 1899 – Knight Commander of the Order of St Michael and St George
- 1903 – Knight Grand Cross of the Royal Victorian Order

== Arms ==
Coat of arms of Albert Woods
Notes It will be noticed that this grant reshuffles the elements of his father's achievement, but the patent makes no reference to Sir William. Adopted 22 December 1891 Crest Out of a crown vallary or a mount vert & thereon in front of an oak-tree as in the arms a demi-man affronté resting the dexter hand on a terrestrial globe proper. Escutcheon Or, on a mount vert a lion statant gardant in front of an oak-tree proper fructed or; on a chief azure between 2 circlets of a king of arms' crown or a pale argent charged with the red cross of St George. Motto Deus Robur Meum ("My God") Orders the circlet of the Royal Victorian Order as GCVO

== See also ==
- Heraldry
- Pursuivant
- Herald

Heraldic offices
Preceded by James Pulman	Portcullis Pursuivant; 1838–1841	Succeeded by George William Collen
Preceded by Sir George Frederick Beltz	Lancaster Herald; 1841–1869	Succeeded by George Edward Cokayne
Preceded by Sir Charles George Young	Garter King of Arms; 1869–1904	Succeeded by Sir Alfred Scott Scott-Gatty
