= Protector of Slaves =

Caribbean administrative posting

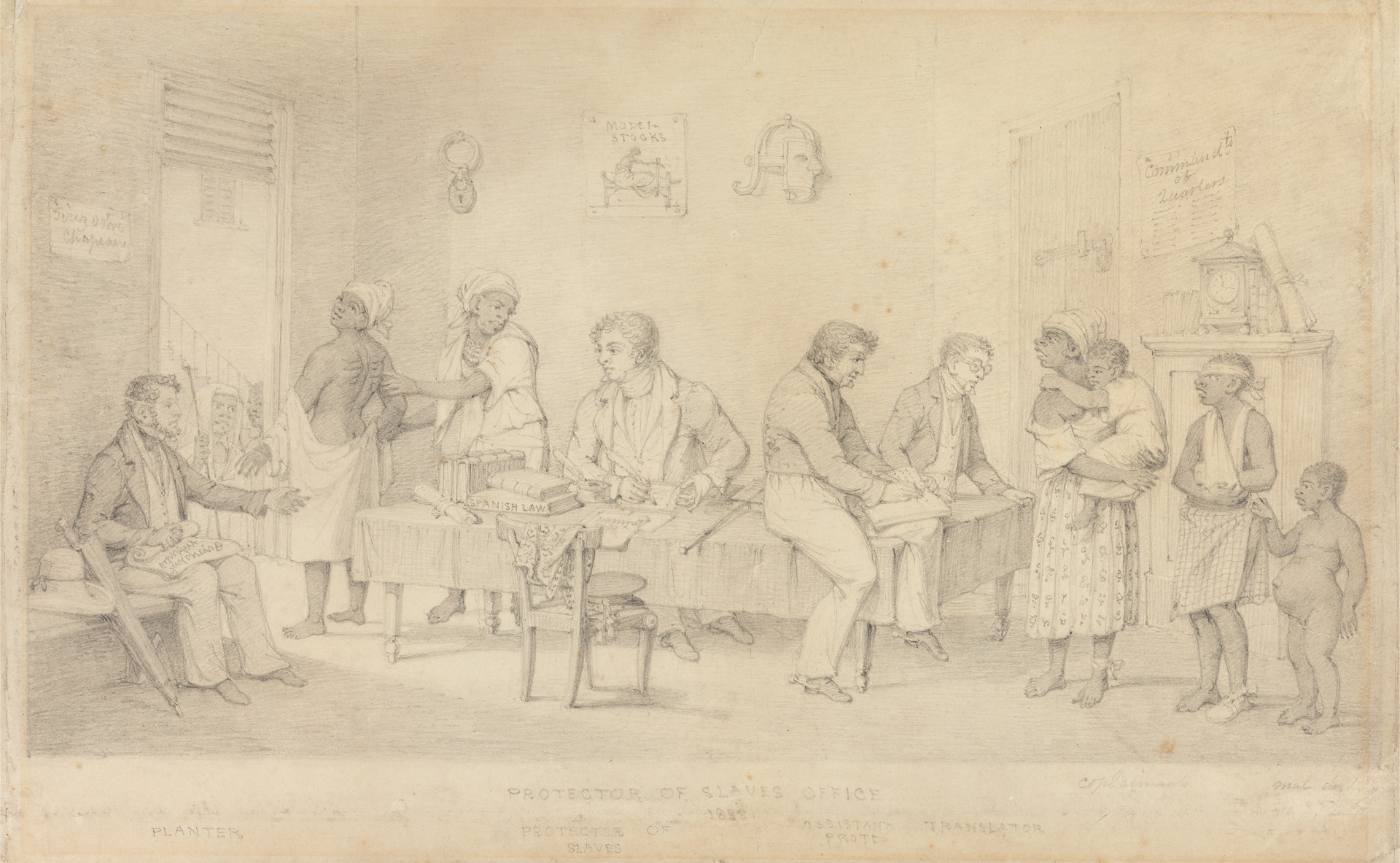
Protector of Slaves' Office (Trinidad) by Richard Bridgens (1833)

The Protector of Slaves was an official post in Trinidad, Demerara, Berbice, St. Lucia, the Cape of Good Hope and Mauritius before the abolition of slavery there between 1 August 1834 and 1 August 1838.

The general role was previously known as the Office of the Fiscal in Berbice, which derived from the former Dutch office in Berbice, and some holders conjoined the titles in their reports, however the later role was based on an Order in Council in the 1820s which provided certain rights to slaves in these colonies. The protector could not be a slave owner, but, at least initially, no such rule applied to assistant protectors.

== List of office holders ==
Full documentation for these appointments should be found in the London Gazette. Meanwhile, years given are those for which references can be supplied. The reports of the protectors were approximately half-yearly. Assistant protectors are also listed.

- Edward Howard-Gibbon (Demerera or Bebice or British Guinea)

=== Demerara ===
Also referred to as Demerara and Essequibo or Demerara-Essequibo from 28 April 1812 when the colonies merged.

1. Aretas William Young (1826-1828)

=== Berbice ===
- Charles Bird (Deputy Protector of Slaves) (1827–1928)
- D. Power (1928)

=== Trinidad ===
Here the title "Protector and Guardian of Slaves" is used.

1. Henry Gloster (1828)

=== St. Lucia ===
1. Peter Muter (1826–8)

==== Assistant protectors ====
- John Goodman (1831)

=== Cape of Good Hope ===
Here reports are from the "Registrar and Guardian of Slaves"

1. George Jackman Rogers (1827-1829)

== See also ==
- Office of the Fiscal
- Protector of the Aborigines
- Protector of the Indians
