= William Berry (genealogist) =

English genealogist (1774–1851)

William Berry (5 November 1774 – 2 July 1851) was an English genealogist, known for various publications on family history and heraldry.

== Life ==
William Berry was born on 5 November 1772, the son of William Berry and his wife Elizabeth. In his early career, 1793–1809, he was employed as a writing clerk to the registrar of the College of Arms. On his retirement from that post, he lived for some time in Guernsey, where he published an able work titled The History of the Island of Guernsey, compiled from the collections of Henry Budd (1815). Prior to this, he had published a work titled Introduction to Heraldry (1810).

Returning to England, he lived at Doddington Place, in Kennington, south London, and in 1832 commenced A Genealogical Peerage of England, Scotland, and Ireland. This was a carefully compiled family history, with beautifully engraved coats of arms, but did not receive much support, and after the issue of the fourth number, which terminated with an account of the dukes of Rutland, no further parts were printed. His Genealogia Antiqua, or Mythological and Classical Tables, published in 1816, met with more success, and a second and improved edition appeared in 1840. This work was dedicated to Lord Grenville.

His next undertaking was entitled Encyclopedia Heraldica, or Complete Dictionary of Heraldry. It was brought out in numbers between 1828 and 1840, eventually running to four quarto volumes. This was a valuable heraldic work, incorporating much of the contents of Joseph Edmondson's Complete Body of Heraldry (1780) and the work of other writers, along with much new and original matter.

Perhaps the writings by which Berry is best known are his county genealogies, published in small folio volumes, and sold at 5 or 6 guineas per volume. These were Kent (1830); Sussex (1830); Hampshire (1833); Berkshire, Buckinghamshire & Surrey (1837); Essex (1839); and Hertfordshire (1842). The last three volumes were printed by means of lithography from Berry's handwriting.

The first portion of county genealogies, Kent, was harshly reviewed in The Gentleman's Magazine, with exception being taken to Berry identifying himself on the title-page as "registering clerk in the College of Arms". Berry consequently brought an action for libel against the publishers of the magazine, J. B. Nichols & Son. The trial took place in the Court of King's Bench before Lord Tenterden on 1 November 1830, when, although Berry was represented by Henry Brougham, afterwards the Lord Chancellor, the jury, without hearing any rebutting evidence, almost immediately returned a verdict in favour of the defendants.

== Personal life and death ==
Berry married Elizabeth Windsor (1776–1851), daughter of Other Windsor and his wife, Susanna de Young, on 24 July 1796, at the church of St Luke Old Street, London. The couple had five daughters and three sons. Berry died at his son's residence, Spencer Place, Brixton, on 2 July 1851, aged 77, having survived his wife by two months.
