= Richmond Herald =

Officer of the College of Arms

- The heraldic badge of Richmond Herald of Arms in Ordinary
- Heraldic tradition: Gallo-British
- Jurisdiction: England, Wales and Northern Ireland
- Governing body: College of Arms

Richmond Herald of Arms in Ordinary is an officer of arms of the College of Arms in England. From 1421 to 1485, Richmond was a herald to John of Lancaster, 1st Duke of Bedford, George Plantagenet, 1st Duke of Clarence, and Henry, Earl of Richmond, all of whom held the Honour (estate) of Richmond. However, on the accession of Henry as Henry VII of England in 1485, Richmond became a king of arms and remained so until 1510, when the office became that of a herald in ordinary of the Crown. The badge of office is a red rose of Lancaster dimidiating the white rose en soleil of York, ensigned by the royal crown. Although this device has all the characteristics of a Tudor invention, it is likely to be of fairly recent derivation.

The office is currently vacant.

== Holders of the office ==
Arms	Name	Date of appointment	Ref
Herald of John of Lancaster, 1st Duke of Bedford
	Peter Bouchard	(1430)	
	Thomas More, Esq.	(Henry VI)	
Herald of George Plantagenet, 1st Duke of Clarence
	William Brereton	(Edward IV)	
	Thomas Griffin, Esq.	(1473)	
Herald of Henry Tudor, 2nd Earl of Richmond
	Roger Machado	(1485)	
Lancaster Herald of Arms in Ordinary
	Robert Browne	1498–1510	
	John Joyner	1511–1522	
	Christopher Barker	1522–1536	
	John Narboone	1536–1540	
	Gilbert Dethick	1540–1547	
	Lawrence Dalton	1547–1557	
	Nicholas Narboone	1557–1566	
	Hugh Cotgrave	1566–1585	
	Richard Lee	1585–1597	
	William Camden	1597–1597	
	John Raven	1597–1615	
	Sir Henry St George	1615–1635	
	George Mainwaring	1635–1660	
	Henry St George, the younger	1660–1677	
	Henry Dethick	1677–1704	
	John Hare	1704–1707	
	Peter Le Neve	1707–1721	
	Robert Dale	1721–1722	
	Charles Whinyates	1722–1737	
	James Lane	1738–1755	
	Francis Grose	1755–1763	
	Henry Pujolas, Jun	1763–1764	
	Peter Dore	1764–1780	
	Ralph Bigland	1780–1803	
	Joseph Hawker	1803–1838	
	James Pulman	1838–1846	
	Matthew Howard-Gibbon	1846–1873	
	Henry Molyneux-Seel	1873–1882	
	Arthur Larken	1882–1889	
	Charles Athill	1889–1919	
	Sir Gerald Wollaston	1919–1928	
	Henry Robert Charles Martin	1928–1942	
	Sir Anthony Wagner	1943–1961	
	Robin Milne Stuart de la Lanne-Mirrlees	1962–1967	
	John Brooke-Little	1967–1980	
	Michael Maclagan	1980–1989	
	Patric Dickinson	1989–2010	
	Clive Cheesman	2010–2024	
	James Peill	2026	
	vacant	2026 – present	

== See also ==
- Heraldry
- Officer of Arms
- The College of Arms
