= David Rankin-Hunt =

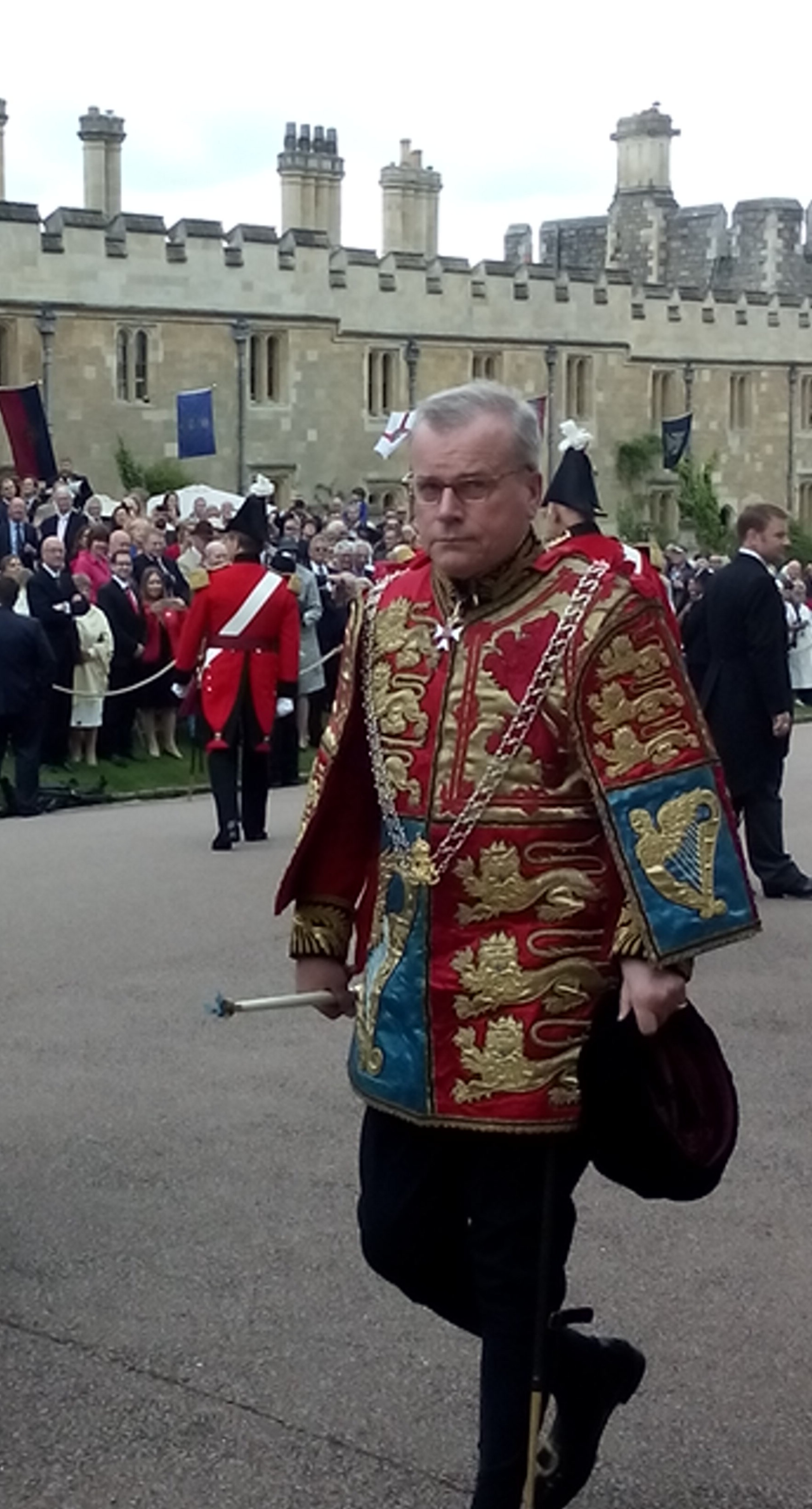
Major David Rankin-Hunt

Major David Rankin-Hunt CVO MBE TD is a British member of the Royal Household at St James's Palace in London. He has been the Norfolk Herald Extraordinary since 1994.

== Royal household ==
Rankin-Hunt worked in the Royal Household for 33 years. His first appointment was as Registrar at the Lord Chamberlain's Office. In 1989, he transferred to the Royal Collection and in 1993 became its Administrator, a position he held until his retirement in 2014.

In 1999 Rankin-Hunt was appointed Secretary of a Working Group set up by the Royal Household, and chaired by the Earl Marshal to organise and plan for future ceremonial events. Rankin-Hunt also held this appointment until his retirement.

== Norfolk Herald Extraordinary ==
In October 1994, Rankin-Hunt was appointed Norfolk Herald Extraordinary under a royal warrant of appointment, the ninth person to hold the office. In 1995, the Ministry of Defence appointed him Deputy Inspector of Regimental Colours. His responsibilities included providing advice and guidance on the badges, colours, standards and guidons of the British Army. He exercised his day-to-day 'responsibilities' on behalf of the Garter Principal King of Arms (Inspector of Regimental Colours). In 1996, Rankin-Hunt was appointed Deputy Inspector of Royal Air Force badges.

== Advisory work ==
In 1995, Rankin-Hunt assumed partial responsibility for advising Commonwealth realms and other countries on honours and awards. over the next 15 years, he designed and instituted honours systems and individual orders, decorations and medals for Antigua and Barbuda, Grenada, St Lucia, Tonga, Tuvalu, Solomon Islands, Barbados and Albania. Rankin-Hunt also provided advice on ceremonial and protocol matters along with constitutional advice to Governors-General.

Rankin-Hunt has lectured at conferences in the Middle East and the Caribbean. From 2005 to 2014, he served as the genealogist of the Orders of Chivalry for Antigua and Barbuda. In 2016, Rankin-Hunt was appointed as Honorary ADC to the Governor General of Antigua and Barbuda.

== Ceremonial events ==
As a herald Rankin-Hunt regularly participates in ceremonial events such as the State Opening of Parliament and the Garter Service at Windsor Castle. During the Golden and Diamond Jubilees, he and the other heralds led the Royal processions through the nave of St Paul's Cathedral for the National Thanksgiving Service.

== Arms ==
Coat of arms of David Rankin-Hunt
Adopted 1995 Escutcheon Gules on a saltire or, two ostrich feathers in saltire also gules each charged with a chain laid among the quill three cross crosslets fitchy two in fess and one in base also gold.
