= John Woody Papworth =

English architect (1820–1870)

John Woody Papworth (4 March 1820 – 6 July 1870) was an English architect, designer and antiquary. He is chiefly remembered for "Papworth's Ordinary" (1874), a reference guide to British and Irish coats of arms arranged systematically according to their design. G. D. Squibb commented in 1961 that "his memory rests more securely upon his Ordinary of British Armorials than upon any building for which he was responsible, though it is but fair to add that his professional achievements were not lightly regarded by his contemporaries".

== Family background ==
Papworth was born in London on 4 March 1820, the elder son of the architect John Buonarotti Papworth. His younger brother, Wyatt Angelicus van Sandau Papworth, also became a well known architect.

== Career ==
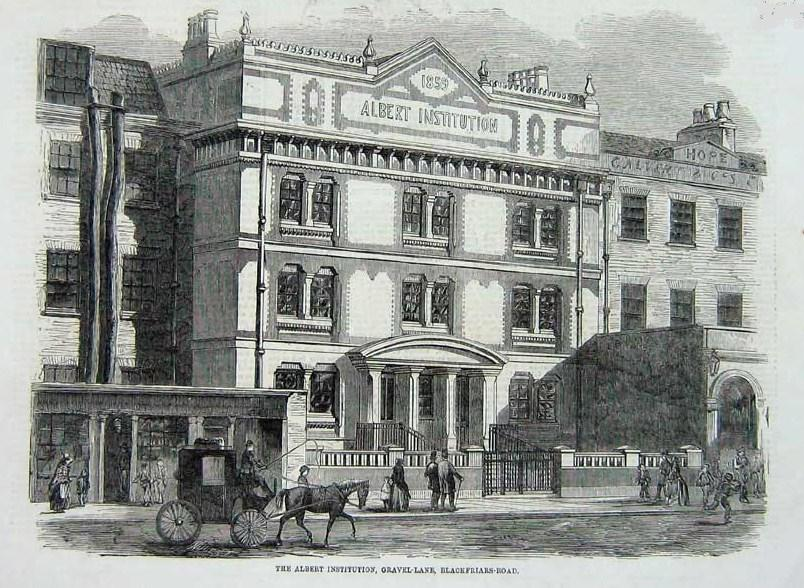
The Albert Institution in Southwark, designed by Papworth: 1859 engraving. The Institution "...opened in Aug. 1859, in one of the most disreputable neighborhoods in London, as a reformatory establishment. It comprises infant, ragged and Sunday schools, a reading room, a library, baths, washhouses, and cheap dormitories."

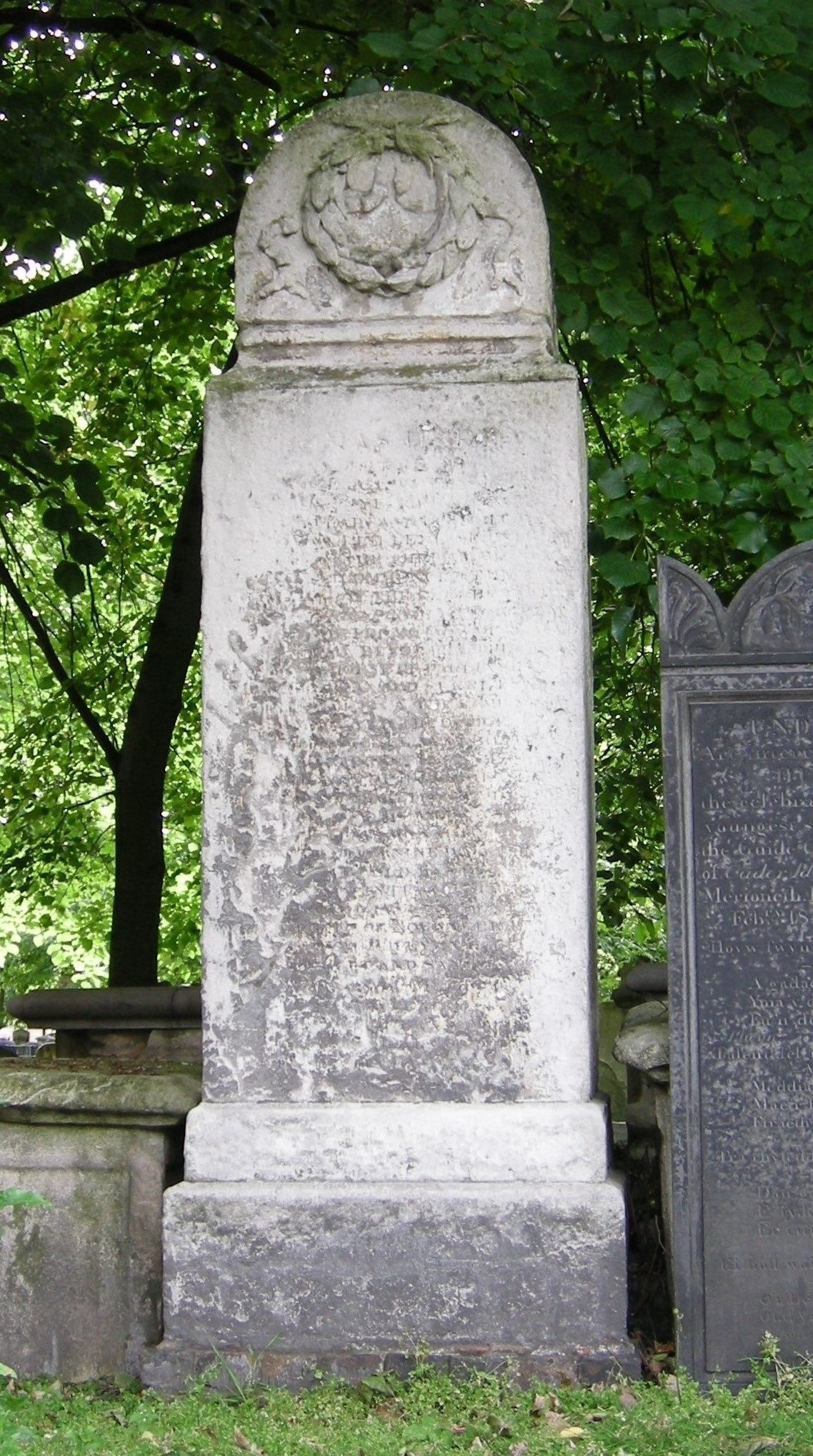
Papworth's monument to Thomas Hardy (died 1832), radical reformer, in Bunhill Fields burial ground

Papworth was trained as an architect in his father's office, where he remained until 1846, when his father retired. In 1837 he became, on its formation, secretary to the council of the Government School of Design at Somerset House, and assisted his father, the director, in its organisation. In 1838 he was awarded the silver Isis medal, in 1840 the gold Isis medal, and in 1845 the Stock medallion at the Society of Arts, in 1842 the Soane medallion, in 1843 the medal of merit, and in 1847 the silver medal of the Institute of British Architects.

In 1841 he was elected an associate, and in 1846 a fellow of the Institute of British Architects.

Although he published widely on architectural matters, and exhibited many architectural designs at the Royal Academy, few of his works were executed. One project that did come to completion was his design for the Albert Institution, opened in 1859 in Gravel Lane, Southwark. Papworth also designed the monument to the radical political reformer Thomas Hardy in Bunhill Fields burial ground.

He produced designs for glass, pottery, terracotta, paperhangings, and other art manufactures; and was responsible for the carpet presented by 150 ladies to Queen Victoria, which was exhibited at the Great Exhibition of 1851.

== Papworth's Ordinary ==
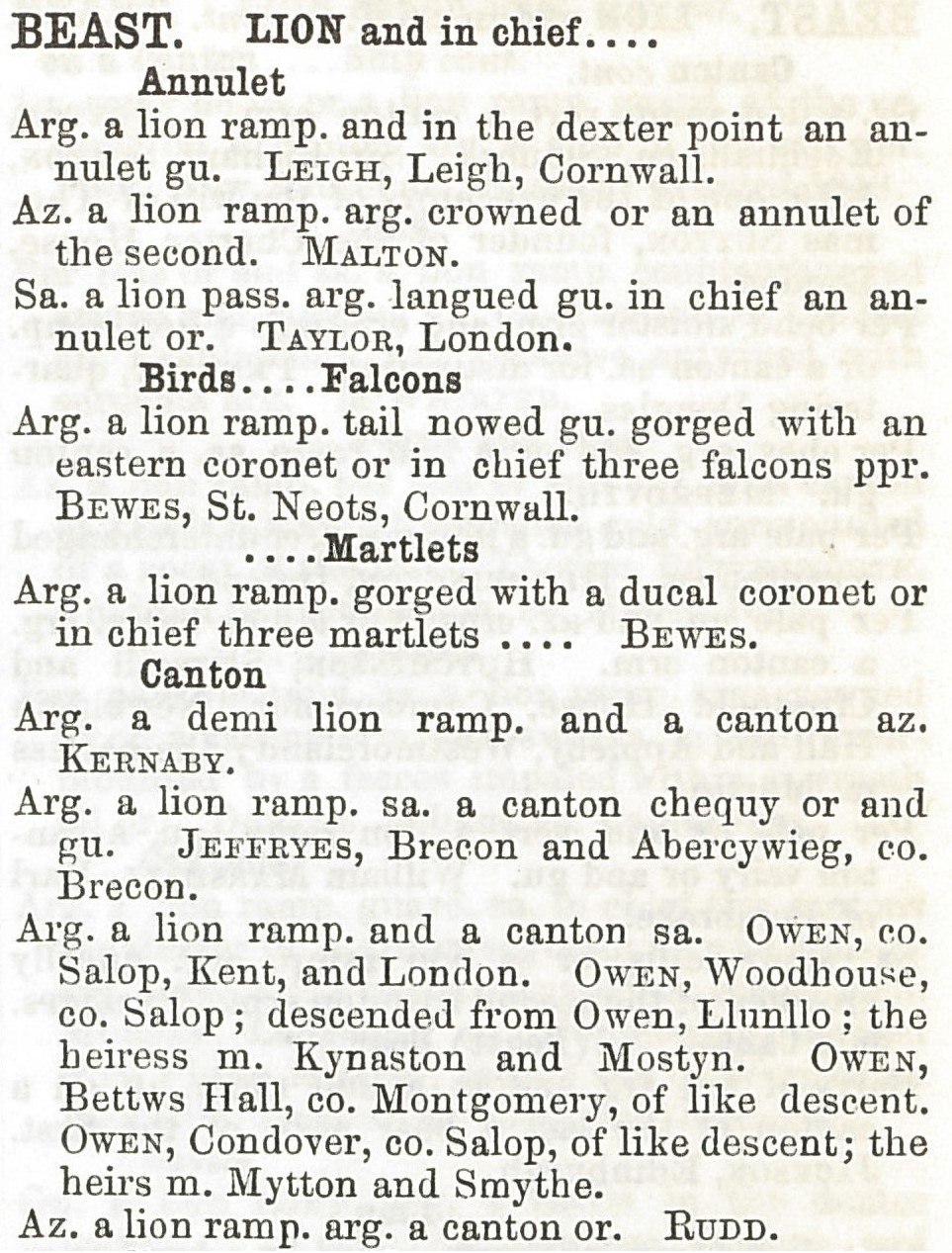
Extract from Papworth's Ordinary (1874)

Papworth's major publication was his Ordinary, or in full An Alphabetical Dictionary of Coats of Arms belonging to Families in Great Britain and Ireland, forming an extensive Ordinary of British Armorials upon an entirely new plan. Ordinaries of arms (rolls of coats of arms arranged by design) had existed since the Middle Ages, but most had been relatively limited in scope. Papworth devised a scheme for a much more comprehensive ordinary, based on his own systematic arrangement of arms by blazon. He began work in 1847, making extensive use of Burke's General Armory, copying its entries onto slips of paper and rearranging them. (The General Armory was a collection of arms arranged alphabetically by surname: first published in 1842, the third edition with supplement had appeared in 1847.) Papworth published a prospectus in 1857, and began to issue his work in instalments: nine parts had appeared by 1863, and fourteen by the time of his death in 1870. By this point the work had proceeded as far as p. 696: the remaining 429 pages were edited and brought to completion from his materials by Alfred William Morant (1828–1881). The Ordinary was seen through the press by Wyatt Papworth, and published as a complete volume in 1874: it contained about 50,000 entries. It rapidly established itself as a standard work of heraldic reference, and was reprinted in 1961, 1977 and 1985.

The greatest strength of Papworth's Ordinary was the rigorousness of its system of classification by blazon, which (with minor modifications) has remained the basis for all ordinaries published since. Its weakness was its dependence for its contents on Burke's General Armory and other secondary sources, which meant that it inherited many of their errors and omissions. One of the book's idiosyncrasies is that (partly because of Papworth's decision to classify all animal charges under the primary heading "Beast", and all birds under "Bird") the alphabetical distribution of entries is highly unbalanced: the headings A–F account for roughly 80% of the book, a point on which Papworth had to reassure anxious subscribers while the work was still in progress.

== Other publications ==
Papworth also published The Ladies' Carpet, designed by J. W. P., presented to, and exhibited by, Her Majesty in the Great Exhibition, 1851 (1852); and he was a frequent contributor to The Builder, and to the Proceedings and Transactions of the Institute of British Architects. He contributed articles to the works of the Architectural Publication Society, founded in 1848, on subjects including Balthazar Gerbier, Frederic Louis Norden, Mathes Roriczer and Aqueducts. He also assisted in the first years of the production of the Dictionary of Architecture, which his brother Wyatt edited from 1852 to 1892.

With Wyatt, and with plates engraved by the authors, Papworth published Specimens of Decoration in the Italian Style selected from the Designs of Raffaello in the Vatican (1844), and Museums, Libraries, and Picture Galleries, Public and Private, their Establishment, Formation, Arrangement, and Architectural Construction, to which is appended the Public Libraries Act, 1850, and Remarks on its adoption by Mechanics and other Scientific Institutions, with Illustrations (1853).

== Personal life and death ==
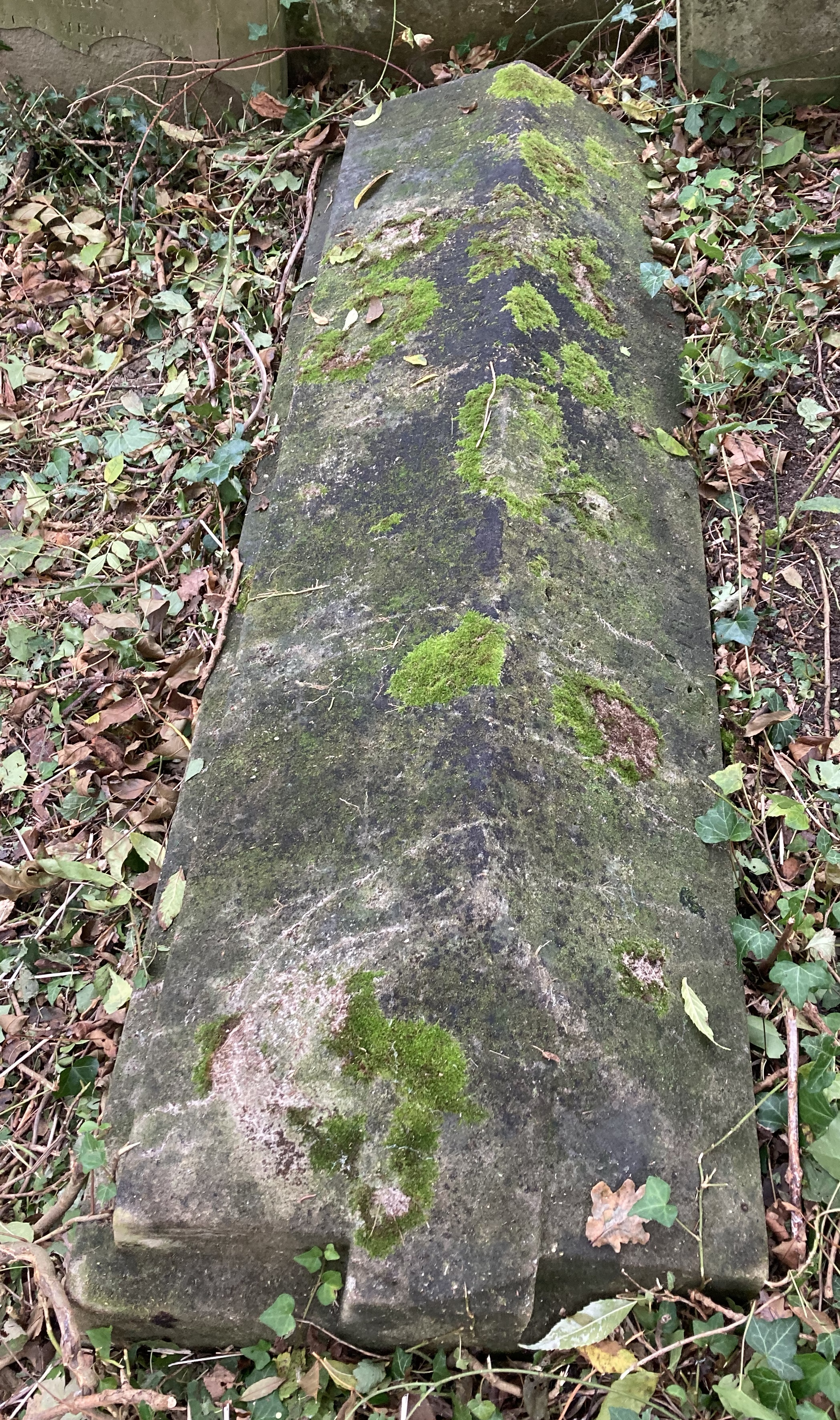
Grave of John Woody Papworth in Highgate Cemetery

Papworth never married. He lived with his brother Wyatt at 14a Great Marlborough Street, central London, which also served as the office of the Architectural Publication Society.

He died, aged 50, on 6 July 1870, from a gangrene which had developed in an injured foot. His death appears to have been hastened by his determination to continue work on his Ordinary.

He was buried on the eastern side of Highgate Cemetery. His brother Wyatt was buried in the same grave on 23 August 1894. The grave (no.17531) no longer has a legible inscription.

== Legacy ==
In 1926 Lt Col George Babington Croft Lyons left a substantial bequest to the Society of Antiquaries to prepare a new edition of Papworth's Ordinary. After many delays, and a decision to restrict the work's scope to England and to the period before 1530, the first volume of what was now entitled the Dictionary of British Arms appeared in 1992. Volume 2 was published in 1996, volume 3 in 2009, and volume 4 (the final volume) in 2014.
