= Robert Plot =

English naturalist and antiquarian (1640–1696)

Robert Plot FRS
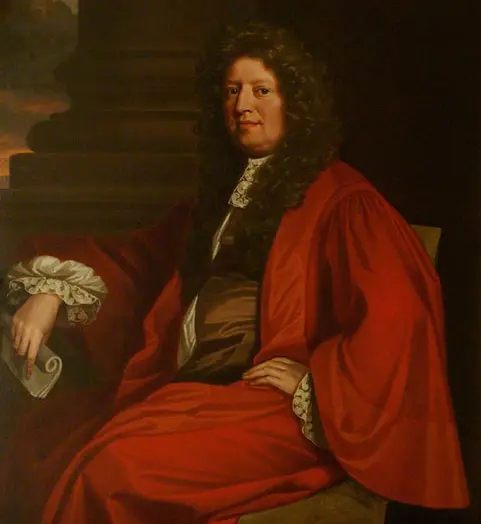
- Born: 13 December 1640; Borden, Kent
- Died: 30 April 1696 (aged 55); England
- Occupations: Professor of Chemistry; Museum keeper
- Known for: First Professor of Chemistry at the University of Oxford; first keeper of the Asmolean Museum

Academic background
- Education: Wye Free School
- Alma mater: Magdalen Hall, Oxford; University College, Oxford

Academic work
- Discipline: Chemist
- Institutions: University of Oxford; Ashmolean Museum
- Notable works: The Natural History of Oxford-shire (1677); De origine fontium (1684)

Robert Plot (13 December 1640 – 30 April 1696) was an English naturalist and antiquarian who was the first professor of chemistry at the University of Oxford and the first keeper of the Ashmolean Museum.

== Early life and education ==
Born in Borden, Kent to parents Robert Plot and Elisabeth Patenden, and baptised on 13 December 1640, Robert Plot was educated at the Wye Free School in Kent. He entered Magdalen Hall, Oxford in 1658 where he graduated with a BA in 1661 and an MA in 1664. Plot subsequently taught and served as dean and vice principal at Magdalen Hall while preparing for his BCL and DCL, which he received in 1671 before moving to University College in 1676.

== Natural history and chemistry ==
By this time, Plot had already developed an interest in the systematic study of natural history and antiquities. In June 1674, with patronage from John Fell, the bishop of Oxford, and Ralph Bathurst, vice-chancellor of the university, Plot began studying and collecting artefacts throughout the nearby countryside, publishing his findings three years later in The Natural History of Oxford-shire. In this work, he described and illustrated various rocks, minerals and fossils, including the first known illustration of a dinosaur bone. He first hypothesized in 1676 the bone belonged to a Roman-era war elephant before connecting it to a human giant like Claudius's Gabbara (later renamed as Scrotum humanum by Richard Brookes in 1772 and now perceived as the femur of a Megalosaurus), but believed that most fossils were not remains of living organisms but rather crystallisations of mineral salts with a coincidental zoological form.

Robert Plot illustrations in his essay of fossils, minerals, artifacts, and Megalosaurus fossil

The favourable reception of his findings not only earned him the nickname of the "learned Dr. Plot," but also led to his election into the Royal Society of London on 6 December 1677, where he served as the society's secretary and joint editor of the Philosophical Transactions (144–178) from 1682 through 1684. Another implication of his success was his appointment as the first keeper of the newly established Ashmolean Museum in 1683, as well as his simultaneous appointment as the first professor of chemistry in the new well-equipped laboratory housed within the museum. He started Oxford's Philosophical Society in the Ashmolean Museum.

In the field of chemistry, he searched for a universal solvent that could be obtained from wine spirits, and believed that alchemy was necessary for medicine. In 1684, Plot published De origine fontium, a treatise on the source of springs, which he attributed to underground channels originating from the sea. Plot shifted his focus towards archaeology in the 1686 publication of his second book, The Natural History of Staffordshire, but misinterpreted Roman remains as Saxon. He also describes a double sunset viewable from Leek, the Abbots Bromley Horn Dance. and, for the first time, the Polish swan, a pale morph of the mute swan.

== Later life and death ==
In 1687, Plot was made a notary public by the Archbishop of Canterbury as well as appointed the registrar to the Norfolk Court of Chivalry. Plot resigned from his posts at Oxford in 1690, thereafter marrying Rebecca Burman of London and retiring to his property of Sutton Barne in his hometown of Borden, where he worked on The Natural History of Middlesex and Kent but never completed. The office of Mowbray Herald Extraordinary was created in January 1695 for Plot, who was made registrar of the College of Heralds just two days later. Although able to go on an archaeological tour of Anglia in September 1695, Plot was greatly suffering from urinary calculi (kidney stones), and succumbed to his illness on 30 April 1696 aged 55. He was buried at Borden Church, where a plaque memorialises him.
