= William Le Neve =

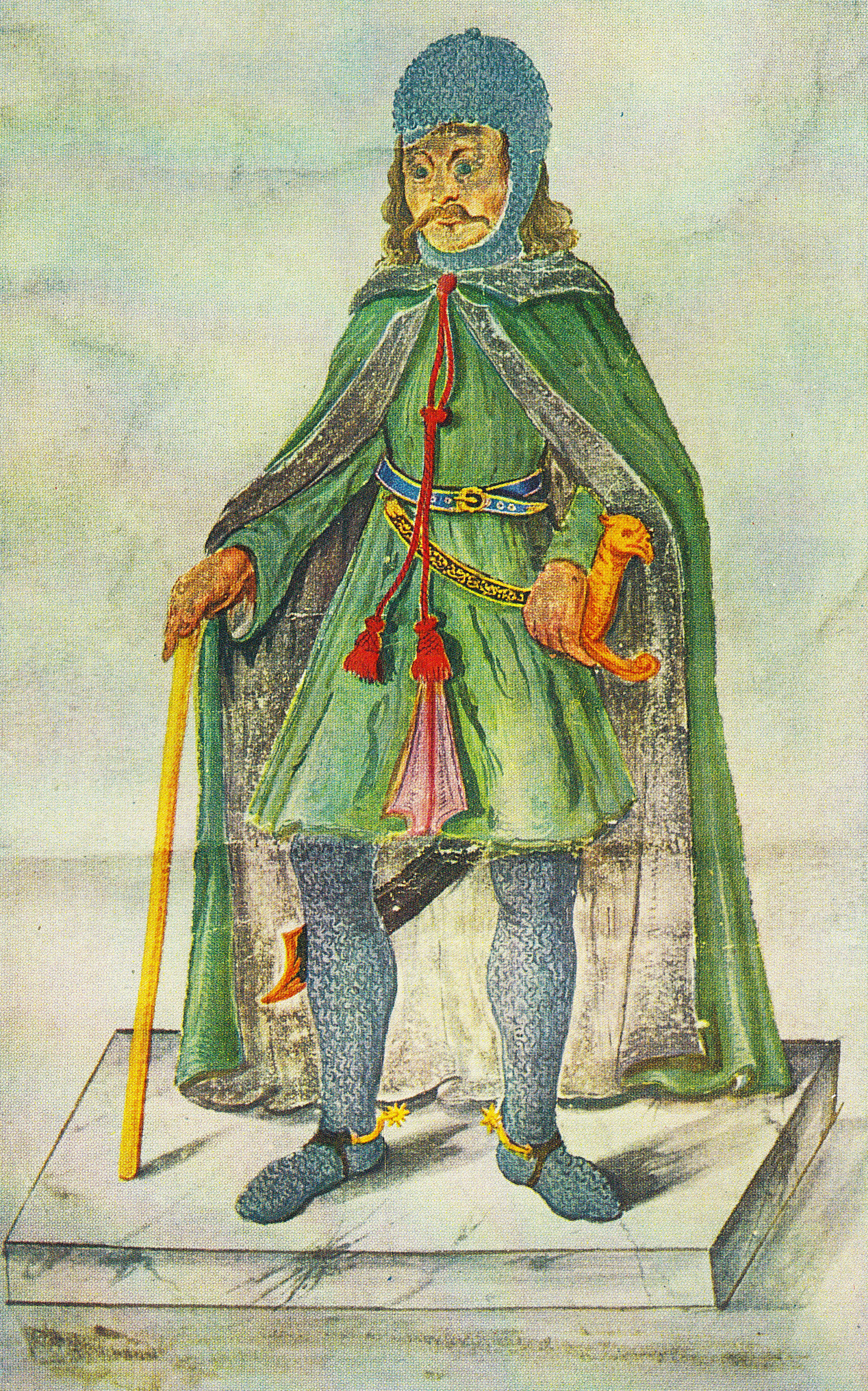
Imaginary depiction painted by William le Neve in 1626 of a Norman knight representing "Hugo de Rosel". From the pedigree (much of it fabricated) of the family of Russell, Earls & Dukes of Bedford, made in 1626 by Sir William le Neve commissioned by Edward Russell, 3rd Earl of Bedford (1572–1627). Collection of Duke of Bedford, Woburn Abbey.

Sir William Le Neve (1600?–1661) was an English herald and genealogist.

== Life ==
Le Neve was the son and heir of William Neve of Aslacton, Norfolk, by his first wife, the daughter of John Aldham of Shimpling; his father died in 1609. Le Neve was appointed Mowbray herald extraordinary, under a warrant dated 24 June 1622 . He was then York herald, 25 November 1625; Norroy King of Arms, December 1633; and Clarenceux King of Arms, 23 June 1635, having been knighted at Whitehall Palace on 23 April 1634. In 1640 he was in correspondence with Sir Christopher Hatton.

In 1625, Le Neve went to France with Henry St George to France, to bring back the future Queen Henrietta Maria. In 1639, Le Neve and George Owen were attached to the Earl Marshal, the Earl of Arundel, for the First Bishops' War. In 1642 Le Neve was sent by Charles I, on the day before the battle of Edgehill, to the parliamentary army under the Earl of Essex, with a proclamation. This mission is now described as intelligence work. Le Neve was deprived of his proclamation, and taken to Essex blindfolded, where his protests were found amusing. There is an account of the brusque treatment he received from Essex in the Earl of Clarendon's History.

Le Neve was deprived of his position in 1646, when Arthur Squibb was made Clarenceux herald. He was declared to be a lunatic in October 1658, and Sir Edward Walker was empowered to execute his office. Again in 1661 he was found to be insane.

Le Neve died at Hoxton, on 15 August 1661, and was buried at St. Benet's, Paul's Wharf. He was not married. An antiquarian and collector, he bought works from the library of William Dethick. He left manuscripts that went to the Ashmolean Museum.

== Arms ==
Coat of arms of William Le Neve
Adopted 1627 Crest From a crown or a lily argent, stalk & leaves vert. Escutcheon Argent, on a cross sable 5 fleurs de lis argent.

== Notes ==
Attribution

This article incorporates text from a publication now in the public domain: Lee, Sidney, ed. (1893). "Le Neve, William". Dictionary of National Biography. Vol. 33. London: Smith, Elder & Co.
