= Wyatt Papworth =

English architect, surveyor and antiquarian

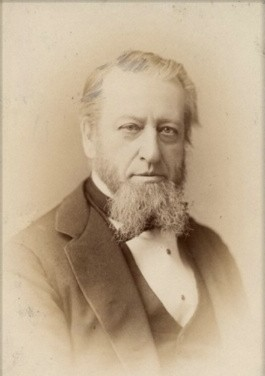
Wyatt Papworth, 1889 photograph

Wyatt Angelicus van Sandau Papworth (1822–1894) was an English architect, surveyor and antiquarian. He is best known for his editorial work on the part-published Dictionary of Architecture, appearing 1853 to 1892, and the 1867 edition of Joseph Gwilt's Encyclopædia of Architecture.

== Life ==
Born in London on 23 January 1822, he was a younger son of the architect John Buonarotti Papworth. He received professional training in his father's office, and for some years worked in the office of the commissioners of sewers for Westminster. After a short time in the office of Sir John Rennie, he became assistant surveyor, under Thomas Allason, to the Alliance Assurance Company. On Allason's death he became sole surveyor there, in 1887 retiring on a pension. Besides the ordinary duties of his office, which comprised very numerous rebuildings and restorations under his direction, he designed and erected for the company a branch office at Ipswich in Suffolk, and published notes on fire risks.

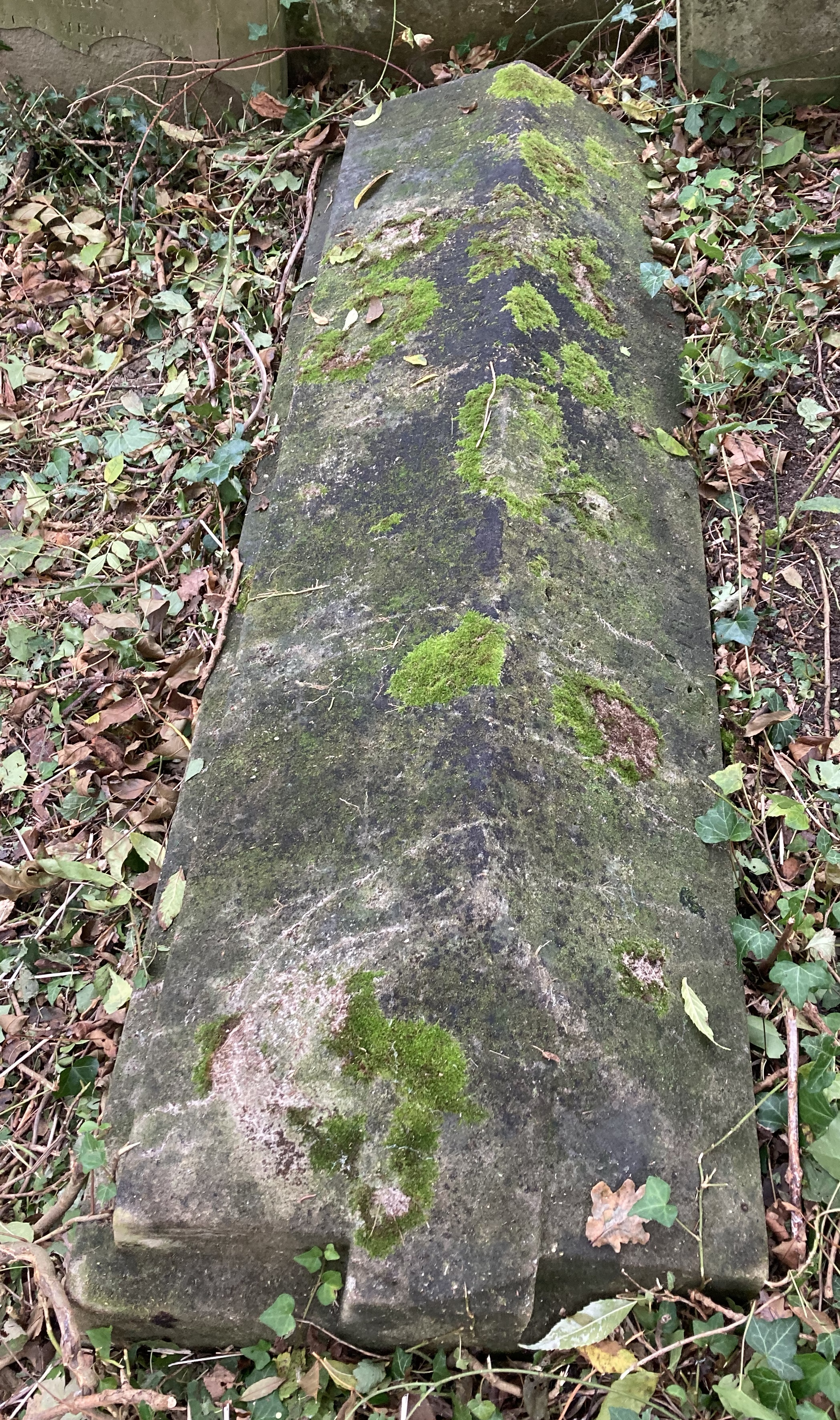
Grave of Wyatt Papworth in Highgate Cemetery

Papworth was elected a fellow of the Royal Institute of British Architects (RIBA) in 1860, and sat for many years on its council. His father being a member of the Cloth-Workers' Company, Papworth in due course became one of its liveryman of the company; and being elected to the court, he in 1879–81 served the offices of junior and senior warden, attaining the position of Master of the Company in 1889. During his year in office he represented the company at the opening of two new technical schools at Bingley and Dewsbury. He was interested in technical education, acting as a governor of the City and Guilds of London Institute, and represented his company on the governing body of Islington Polytechnic.

In 1893, on the death of James William Wild, Papworth was appointed curator of Sir John Soane's Museum in Lincoln's Inn Fields.

He died at the Soane Museum on 19 August 1894, and was buried on 23 August in the eastern side of Highgate cemetery with his brother, the architect John Woody Papworth who had died twenty four years earlier. The grave (no.17531) no longer has a readable inscription.

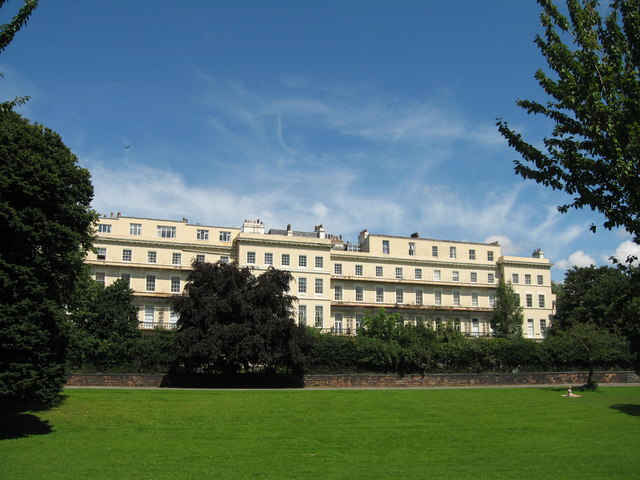
Princes Park Mansions, a terrace in Liverpool designed by Wyatt Papworth for an 1843 competition

== Works ==
Papworth undertook antiquarian investigations on topics associated with his profession. He sought to define the periods when fir, deal, and house-painting were introduced into England, and to determine the extent of the use of chestnut-timber in old buildings. He researched the architects of medieval buildings, and, while not himself a Freemason, their connection with freemasonry. His concern was the correct attribution of the designs for the buildings erected in England during the Middle Ages.

In 1848, when Papworth and his brother John Woody Papworth had accumulated notes on the history of architecture, he issued a circular letter, suggesting a "Society for the Promotion of Architectural Information intended for the Revival and Restoration, Investigation and Publication, of Knowledge in Architecture and the Arts connected therewith." The result was the formation of the Architectural Publication Society for the production of "Detached Essays and Illustrations", which might be subsequently incorporated in a Cyclopædia of Architecture. Papworth prepared a list of 12,127 terms or headings. In 1852 the plan of the cyclopædia was reduced to a Dictionary of Explanation and Reference, which was started under the direction of a committee of leading architects. Wyatt Papworth was secretary and editor, and was assisted by his brother, John. The first part of this Dictionary was published in May 1853, and the last part in April 1892, forming eight volumes folio of text, and three volumes of illustrations, and containing 18,456 articles. The editorship and compilation of the Dictionary were entirely in Papworth's hands; nearly all the lists and references in the text and most of the biographical and topographical articles were also his. The work was printed for subscribers only, and produced at a cost of nearly £10,000.

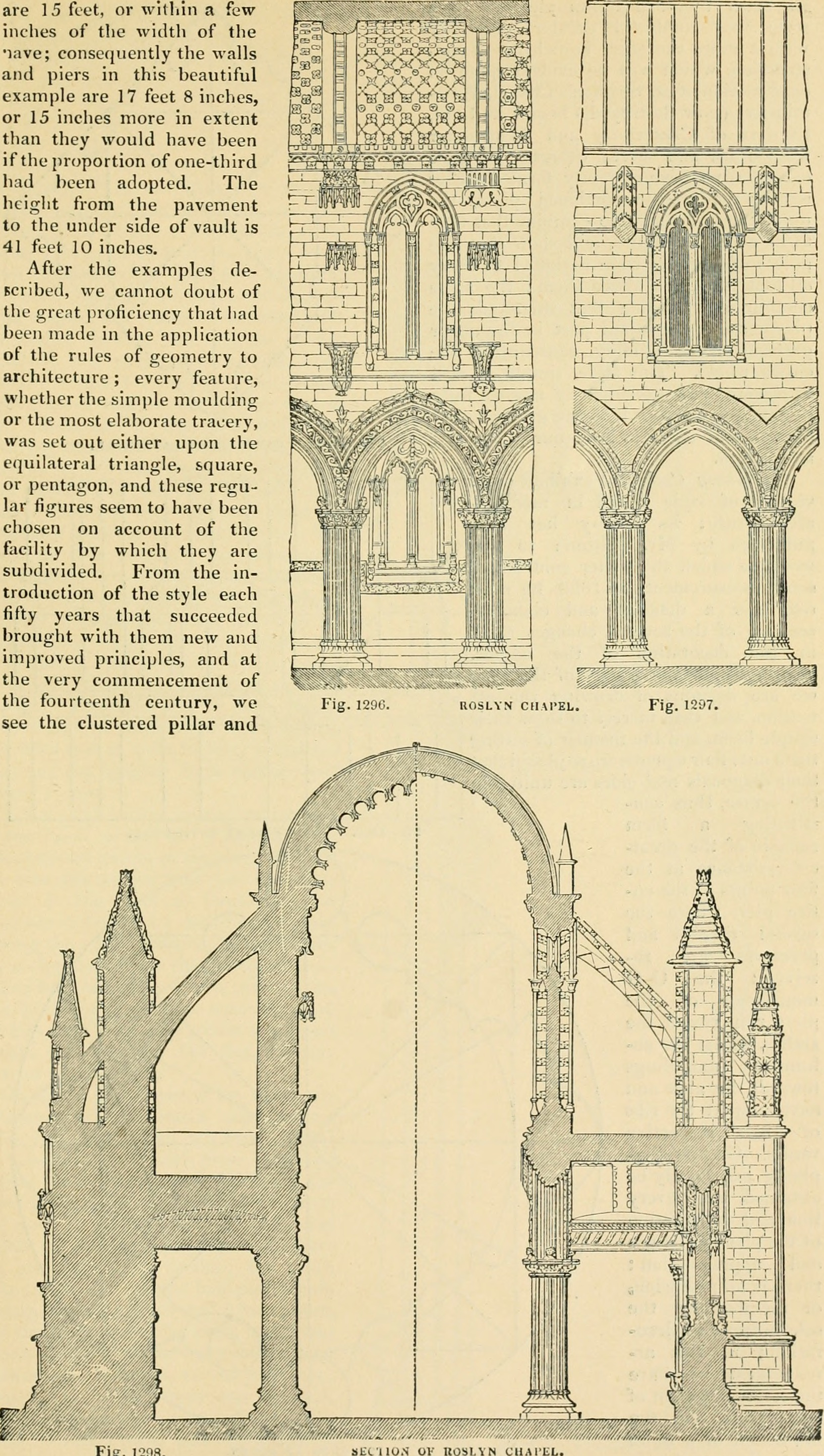
Page from the 1888 edition of the Encyclopædia of Architecture, edited by Wyatt Papworth

Papworth revised and edited in 1867 Joseph Gwilt's Encyclopædia of Architecture, first published in 1842. Papworth's edition included new information, which was greatly increased in two further editions produced by him in 1876 and 1889.

For the Soane Museum, Papworth rewrote the Catalogue, and produced a sixth edition of its General Description. He supported the Dictionary of National Biography in the preparation of articles on architects, and himself contributed articles to vols. xli.–xliii.

With his brother John, Papworth published:

- Specimens of Decoration in the Italian Style, London, 1844.
- Museums, Libraries, and Picture Galleries, London, 1853.
- Notes on the Causes of Fires in Buildings, arising from Grates, Furnaces, Stoves, and Gas, and which is the safest of the various Methods of Warming Buildings, London, 1853.
- Notes on Spontaneous Combustion, London, 1855.
- Life and Works of J. B. Papworth, Architect to the King of Würtemburg, London, 1879.
- Memoirs of A. W. Morant, London, 1881.
- The Renaissance and Italian Styles of Architecture in Great Britain, their Introduction and Development shown by a Series of Dated Examples, London, 1883.

The brothers applied together in architectural competitions: for Newhaven Wharf railway station (1847), and Cambridge Guildhall (1859).

An early essay by Papworth on The Peculiar Characteristics of the Palladian School of Architecture was in 1849 awarded the silver medal of the Institute of British Architects. Among papers he contributed to the Transactions of the Royal Institute of British Architects were:

- Memoir of the late Joseph Bonomi, Architect and A.R.A., with Description of some Drawings of his Design for Roseneath, erected for the Duke of Argyll, 1869, vol. xix.
- Notes on the Architectural and Literary Works of the late Arthur Ashpitel, F.S.A., 1869, vol. xix.
- Fall of the Dome of the Koltovskoie Church, St. Petersburg, 1872, vol. xxii.
- On the Fall of the Iron Dome of the Anthæum at Brighton, 1872, vol. xxii.
- Professor Donaldson: his Connection with the Institute, 1 February 1886
- Notes on the Superintendents of English Buildings in the Middle Ages, new ser. 1887, iii. 185–234.

His collections for the "History of the King's Artificers", "The Clerk of Works of the City of London", "The District Surveyors of London", and other papers, were deposited in the RIBA library.

== Family ==
Papworth married in 1873 Marian Baker (born 1838), daughter of Henry Baker and his wife Thermuthis Mayo. Their children were:

- Lucy Wyatt Papworth (1874–1921), educated at Somerville College, Oxford and secretary of the Women's Industrial Council.
- John Wyatt Papworth (born 1876)
- Alfred Wyatt Papworth (1879–1917), also an architect, in practice with Gilbert Henry Lovegrove (1878–1951).
