= Norfolk Herald of Arms Extraordinary =

- The heraldic badge of Norfolk Herald of Arms Extraordinary
- Heraldic tradition: Gallo-British
- Jurisdiction: England, Wales and Northern Ireland
- Governing body: College of Arms

Norfolk Herald of Arms Extraordinary is an officer of arms in England. As an officer extraordinary, Norfolk is a royal herald, though not a member of the corporation of the College of Arms in London. Beginning in 1539 this officer was a herald to the dukes of Norfolk, though the first holder, John James, was paid a salary by King Henry VIII. Subsequent Norfolk heralds have been officers extraordinary, though the office has not always been filled but rather revived when required. The badge of office, assigned in 1958, is blazoned as Two Ostrich Feathers saltirewise each charged with a Gold Chain laid along the quill. It derives from the ostrich feather badge granted by King Richard II around 1387 as a mark of special favor to Thomas Mowbray, Duke of Norfolk, Marshal of England. Mowbray was also the first to be styled Earl Marshal.

The current Norfolk Herald of Arms Extraordinary is Maj. David Rankin-Hunt, CVO, MBE, KCN, TD. Rankin-Hunt was appointed by Royal Warrant in October 1994 and is the ninth person to hold the office. Following the retirement of Sir Conrad Swan as Garter King of Arms in 1995 he assumed some responsibility for advising certain Commonwealth Realms and a few non-Commonwealth Countries on Honours and Awards. In the last fifteen years he has designed and instituted Honours systems and individual Orders, Decorations and Medals for over eight countries. These include Antigua and Barbuda, Grenada, St Lucia, Tonga, Tuvalu, Solomon Islands, Barbados and Albania.

== Holders of the office ==
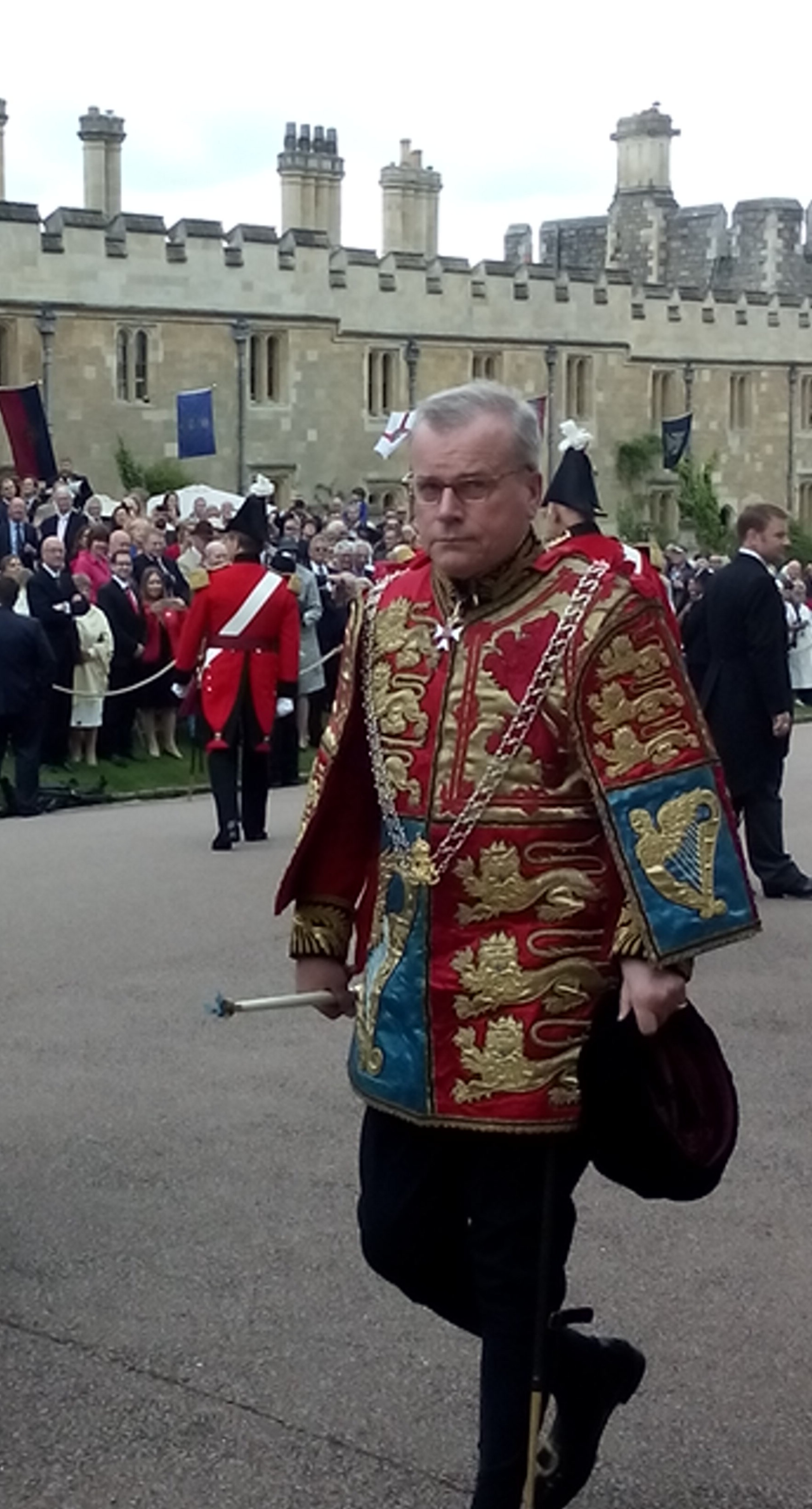
Major David Rankin-Hunt

Arms	Name	Date of appointment	Ref
	John James	17 April 1539	
	John Anstis the elder	18 May 1707	
	William Oldys	15 April 1755	
	Stephen Martin Leake	21 September 1761	
	William Woods	9 May 1825	
	Albert Woods	29 October 1841	
	Hugh Stanford London	27 April 1953	
	George Drewry Squibb	24 April 1959	
	David Rankin-Hunt	25 October 1994	

== See also ==
- Heraldry
- Officer of Arms
