= Mary Ann Gibbon =

Mary Ann Gibbon was the long-term mistress of Charles Howard, 11th Duke of Norfolk, from approximately 1795 until his death in 1815. She was purportedly married to him by a Catholic priest about 1796, while the Duke's second wife was still living but residing in an insane asylum since 1772.

Gibbon lived at Norfolk House in London for most of this time, but is believed to have also travelled with the Duke to Arundel Castle during his stays there. She was the mother of five of children by Duke Charles, Matthew Charles Howard-Gibbon, Edward Howard Howard-Gibbon, Mary Eliza Howard-Gibbon, Caroline Howard-Gibbon, and Richard Howard-Gibbon. Their second son served as the mayor of Arundel during the official visit by Queen Victoria.
