= Edward Howard-Gibbon =

English surgeon, lawyer & officer of arms (1799-1849)

Edward Howard Howard-Gibbon
- Born: 9 August 1799; London, England
- Died: 22 June 1849 (aged 49); John Street James's Square
- Resting place: St Nicholas Churchyard, Arundel, England
- Occupations: Surgeon, lawyer, officer of arms
- Spouse: Amelia Dendy Howard-Gibbon
- Children: 6
- Parents: Charles Howard, 11th Duke of Norfolk (father); Mary Ann Gibbon (mother)
- Relatives: Amelia Frances Howard-Gibbon (daughter); Matthew Howard-Gibbon (brother)

Edward Howard Howard-Gibbon (9 August 1799 – 22 June 1849) was an English surgeon, lawyer, and officer of arms. He was born Edward Howard Gibbon in London and was the second son of Charles Howard, 11th Duke of Norfolk, and Mary Ann Gibbon, the Duke's long-time mistress.

Edward received a formal education, became a surgeon in his early adult years, and then pursued legal training. He and his family migrated to British Guiana to serve as "Protector of the Slaves" before returning to England. He established himself as an officer of arms at the College of Arms. He served as Mowbray Herald, York Herald of Arms in Ordinary and Norroy King of Arms(1848–1849), and secretary to the Earl Marshal. His older brother Matthew Howard-Gibbon was Richmond Herald of Arms in Ordinary.

Edward received his hyphenated surname and family coat of arms in 1842 by Royal Licence with consent of the 13th Duke of Norfolk. He served as the mayor of Arundel during the time of Queen Victoria's official visit in 1846. He died on 22 June 1849 in London and is buried at Saint Nicholas Churchyard in Arundel. He was survived by his wife Amelia Dendy Howard-Gibbon and six children. His oldest daughter, Amelia Frances Howard-Gibbon, later became a well-known artist in Ontario, Canada, and the annual Canadian children's illustration award is named for her.

== Arms ==
Coat of arms of Edward Howard-Gibbon
Crest (1) for Gibbon: A fret or & issuing therefrom an ostrich feather argent; (2) for Howard: Out of a crown or two wings gules each charged with a bend between 6 crosses crosslet argent, the whole debruised by a baton sinister party per bend or & azure. Escutcheon Quarterly in a border wavy gobony or & azure; (1 & 4) for Gibbon: Sable, a fret & in chief 2 open fetterlocks or (alluding to his title of York); (2 & 3) for Howard: Gules, on a bend between 6 crosses crosslet fitchy argent an escocheon or charged with a demi-lion pierced through the mouth with an arrow within a double tressure flory counter-flory all gules. Motto My Truste Ys

Heraldic offices
Preceded by Charles George Young	York Herald; 1820–1842	Succeeded by Thomas King
Preceded by James Pulman	Norroy King of Arms; 1848–1849	Succeeded by Robert Laurie
