= Matthew Howard-Gibbon =

British officer of arms

Matthew Charles Howard-Gibbon
- Born: 13 November 1796
- Died: 16 December 1873 (aged 77); Yapton, West Sussex, England
- Spouse: Charlotte Blackman (m. 1822)
- Children: 0
- Parents: Charles Howard, 11th Duke of Norfolk (father); Mary Ann Gibbon (mother)
- Relatives: Edward Howard-Gibbon (brother); Amelia Frances Howard-Gibbon (niece)

Matthew Charles Howard-Gibbon (13 November 1796 – 16 December 1873) was a long-serving officer of arms at the College of Arms in London. He was born Matthew Charles Howard Gibbon in London, and was the oldest son of Charles Howard, 11th Duke of Norfolk and Mary Ann Gibbon—his long-time mistress and purportedly his third wife. Matthew was married to Charlotte Blackman in 1822, and they originally lived on a small estate in Yapton, but were not known to have had any children. Matthew received his hyphenated surname and family coat of arms in 1842 by Royal Licence obtained by his brother, Edward Howard-Gibbon, with consent of the 13th Duke of Norfolk.

He was appointed by the Duke of Norfolk to the office of Richmond Herald of Arms in Ordinary at the College of Arms in 1846. In 1869, he was noted as the last member of the College to actually live there during his long tenure in that position. He died 16 December 1873 in Yapton, and he left most of his estate to his niece and accomplished Canadian schoolteacher-artist Amelia Frances Howard-Gibbon.
