= William Woods (officer of arms) =

Officer of arms at the College of Arms (1785–1842)

Sir William Woods KH FSA (17 August 1785 - 25 July 1842) was an officer of arms at the College of Arms in London. Woods was a bastard of unknown paternity. He used the name and arms of George Woods, a London tailor, but was said to be the son of the Duke of Norfolk. George IV was a close friend. In 1815 Woods was appointed Secretary to the Knights-Commander and Companions of the Order of the Bath, and registrar of the Guelphic Order, and in 1819 he became Bluemantle Pursuivant at the College of Arms (to this was added the position of Norfolk Herald in 1825). He was appointed Clarenceux King of Arms in 1831, and promoted to Garter in 1838.

Woods had two mistresses and at least six children. One of his sons, Albert William, went on to become Garter in 1869. He died at Lauriestone Lodge, his home in Hampstead, and was buried in Hampstead Church.

== Arms ==
Coat of arms of William Woods
Notes Matriculated in Lyon Register to George Woods of London Esq., brother and heir of William Woods of Edinburgh deceased; recorded at the College of Arms 1814 (Scotland, 1, 106–7). Adopted 6 June 1812 Crest 1st Crest: Out of an open crown or a demi-woodman proper with a club or over his shoulder. 2nd Crest: Out of an open crown or a mount vert thereon a lion statant gardant or in front of an oak-tree proper fructed or. Escutcheon Azure, a woodman proper wreathed temples & middle with laurel vert, in his dexter hand a club head downwards in pale or, his sinister arm extended & pointing upwards & his right foot resting on a bezant, on a chief or a lion passant gardant gules. Motto Deus Robur Meum ("My God")
