= Joseph Edmondson =

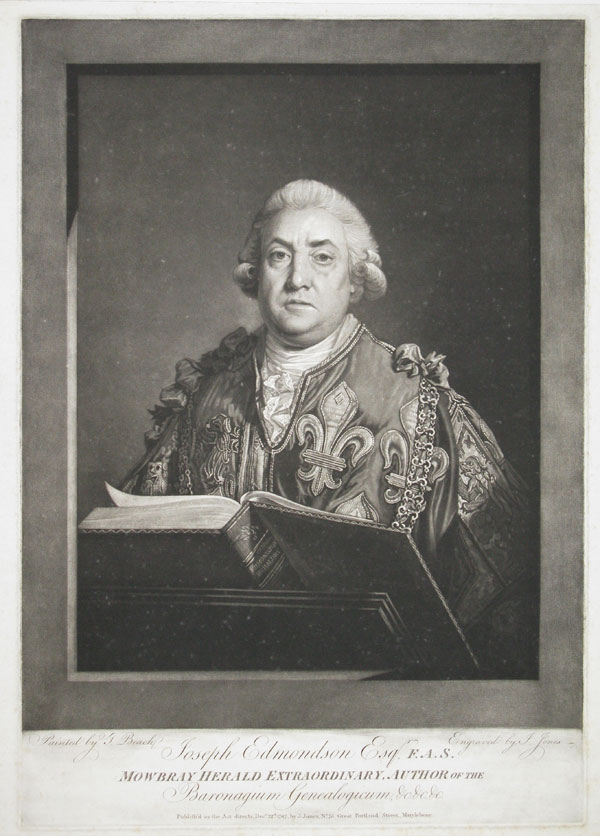
Edmondson wearing his herald's tabard and Collar of SS, mezzotint by John Jones, from a painting by Thomas Beach

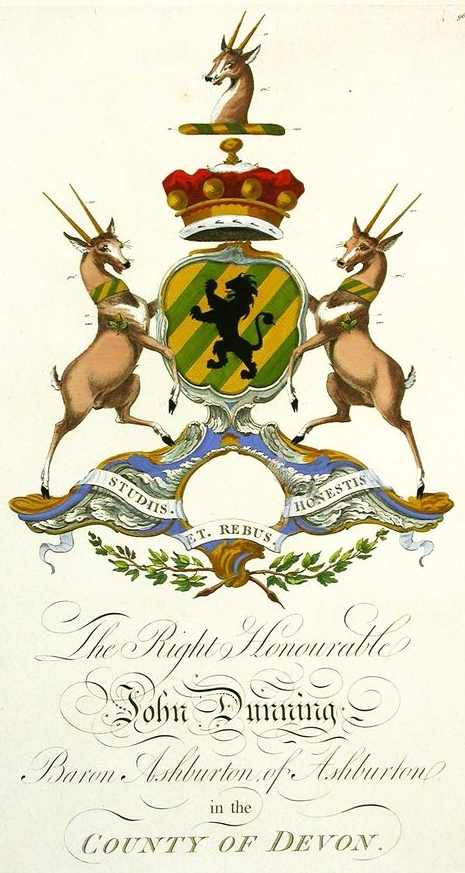
Typical depiction of a heraldic achievement drawn by Edmondson (with later tinting, here the arms of Dunning), in Baronagium Genealogicum

Joseph Edmondson (died 1786) was an English herald and genealogist whose principal work is the Baronagium Genealogicum ("or the Pedigrees of the English Peers, Deduced from the Earliest Times: Originally Compiled by Sir William Segar, and Continued to the Present Time"), 5 volumes, published in London, 1764.

== Career ==
Edmondson was originally apprenticed to a barber, but afterwards became a coach-painter, and being much employed in emblazoning arms on carriages was led to the study of heraldry and genealogy. He was elected a fellow of the Society of Antiquaries, and in March 1764 was created Mowbray Herald Extraordinary. This appointment in the College of Arms did not prevent him from continuing the coach-painting business, which he carried on successfully for many years. The appearance of his Baronagium (1764) attracted the attention of the nobility, and brought him much employment in the compilation of pedigrees. Most of the peers had their genealogies drawn up or rearranged by him. When the baronets made an unsuccessful attempt to obtain some augmentation of their privileges, as appendages to their titles, they chose Edmondson as their secretary. He died at his residence in Warwick Street, Golden Square, on 17 February 1786, and was buried in the cemetery of St James's, Piccadilly. His extravagant manner of living prevented him from leaving any considerable property to his son, who continued the business of coach-painter till his death, which happened soon after that of his father. Edmondson's library was sold by auction in 1788.

== Works ==
- Baronagium Genealogicum, or the Pedigrees of the English Peers, Deduced from the Earliest Times: Originally compiled by Sir William Segar, and continued to the present time by Joseph Edmondson, 5 vols. Lond. 1764, folio. The work was originally published in numbers, and when completed sold for twenty-five guineas. It was followed by a sixth volume of subsequent creations. The whole may be considered as a work of infinite labour, but the information given is not much to be depended upon. The plates of arms are very well executed, but are in bad taste; some of them were engraved by Francesco Bartolozzi. Many of the large quartered coats were presentation plates, contributed by the peers at their own expense. A copy of the work in the British Museum has many valuable manuscript additions by Francis Hargrave.
- An Historical and Genealogical Account of the noble Family of Greville: Including the History and Succession of the Several Earls of Warwick since the Norman Conquest, and some account of Warwick Castle, Lond. 1766, 8vo.
- A Companion to the Peerage of Great Britain and Ireland, Lond. 1776, 8vo.
- A Complete Body of Heraldry: containing an Historical Enquiry into the origin of Armories; the Proper Methods of Blazoning and Marshalling Armorial Bearings; the Arms of all Sovereign Princes and States; an Historical Catalogue of all the Different Orders of Knighthood; the Arms of the Counties, Cities, Boroughs, and Towns Corporate in England and Wales; and of the abbies and Religious Houses; the Arms of Archiepiscopal and Episcopal Sees; a Discourse on Funeral Trophies; Glover's Ordinary of Arms Augmented and Improved; an Alphabet of Arms; and a Copious Glossary, 2 vols. Lond. 1780, folio. An account of the multifarious contents of this splendid work is given in Moule's Bibl. Heraldica, pp. 430–8.
- Precedency. Lond. (1780?), 24mo.
- The present Peerages; the Plates of Arms Revised by Joseph Edmondson. Lond. 1785, 8vo.
- Alphabet of Arms with the Arms in Trick. Manuscript (Thorpe, Cat. of Ancient MSS. 1835, No. 329).
- Proposal for the Institution of an Order of Merit, with Drawings. Addit. MS. 6330, f. 32.
- Papers Relating to the Institution of the Order of St Patrick, 1783. Addit. MS. 14410, f. 10.
- Pedigrees of Families of Great Britain, 1784–6. Addit. MS. 19819. In the compilation of his Baronagium and Complete Body of Heraldry he was greatly assisted by Sir Joseph Ayloffe, Bart.

A fine portrait of Edmondson, in his tabard and collar of SS., engraved by Bartolozzi, is prefixed to the first volume of the Complete Body of Heraldry. There is another portrait of him in mezzotint by John Jones, from a painting by Thomas Beach. In the British Museum there is a printed catalogue of his library, including a collection of manuscripts sold 26–28 June 1786.
