= Charles Howard, 11th Duke of Norfolk =

British nobleman, peer, and politician

His Grace The Duke of Norfolk
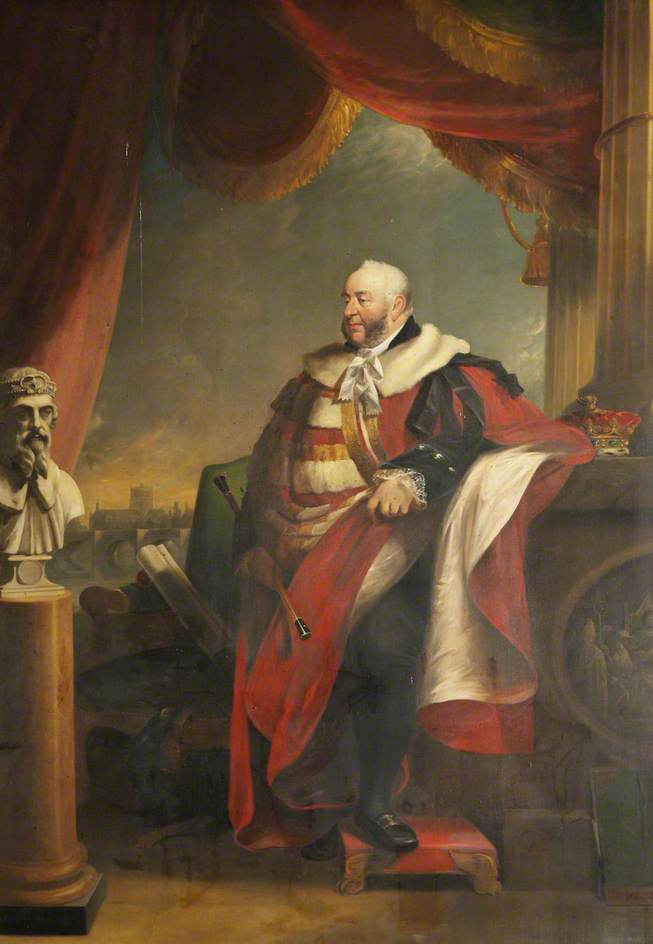
- Painting by Thomas Gainsborough.

Earl Marshal
- In office 31 August 1786 – 16 December 1815
- Monarch: George III
- Preceded by: The 10th Duke of Norfolk
- Succeeded by: The 12th Duke of Norfolk

Member of the House of Lords Lord Temporal
- In office 31 August 1786 – 16 December 1815; Hereditary Peerage
- Preceded by: The 10th Duke of Norfolk
- Succeeded by: The 12th Duke of Norfolk

Member of Parliament
- In office 1780–1784

Personal details
- Born: 15 March 1746
- Died: 16 December 1815 (aged 69)
- Spouse(s): Marion Coppinger; Frances Scudamore
- Parents: Charles Howard, 10th Duke of Norfolk (father); Catherine Brockholes (mother)

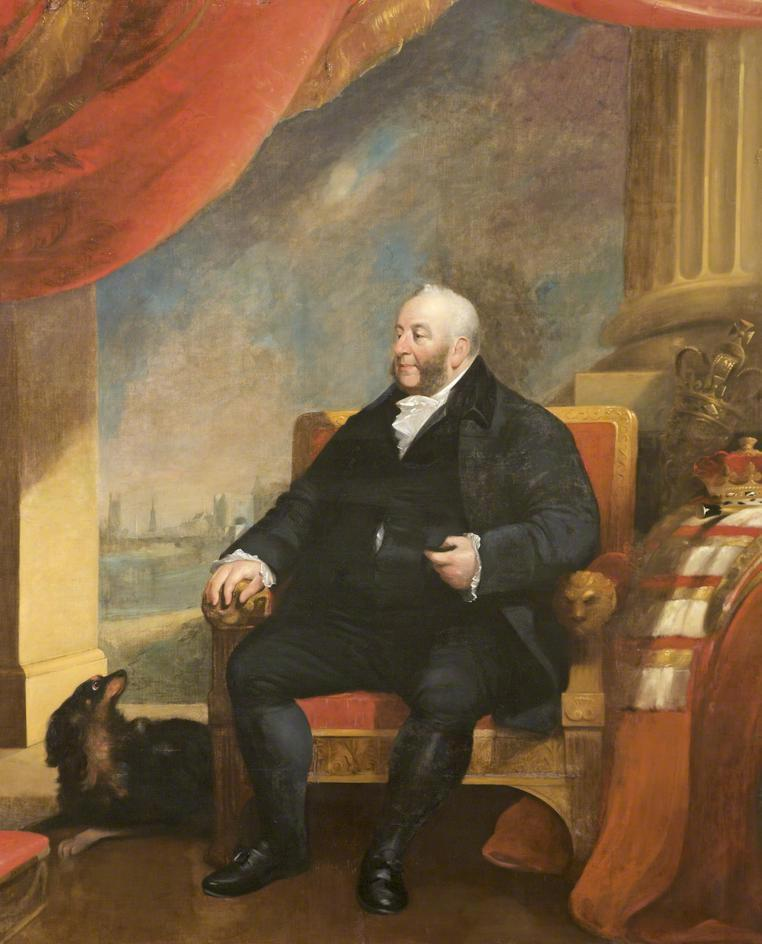
A portrait of Howard in later life by James Lonsdale from the collection of the Gloucester City Museum & Art Gallery

Charles Howard, 11th Duke of Norfolk (15 March 1746 – 16 December 1815), styled Earl of Surrey from 1777 to 1786, was a British nobleman, peer, and politician. He was the son of Charles Howard, 10th Duke of Norfolk, and Catherine Brockholes. He was known for actively participating in the Whig party as part of the opposition to King George III. He also spent a considerable amount of his money rebuilding and refurbishing Arundel Castle after inheriting his title and lands.

== Family ==
He married, firstly, Marion Coppinger (daughter of John Coppinger), on 1 August 1767, who died a year later giving birth. He married, secondly, Frances Scudamore (1750–1820), the only child of Charles FitzRoy-Scudamore and his wife Frances, formerly Duchess of Beaufort, on 6 April 1771 at London, England. Frances became insane soon after her marriage and was locked away until her death in 1820. Howard then lived with several mistresses. His longtime mistress, Mary Ann Gibbon (a cousin of Edward Gibbon), was reputed to be his secret third wife and she had five children by him, including two sons who were officers of arms, Matthew Howard-Gibbon, and Edward Howard-Gibbon. An older illegitimate son by a previous mistress, Sir William Woods, later became Garter King of Arms.

== Life and politics ==
Norfolk renounced his Catholicism to start his political life, but remained a staunch supporter of Catholic emancipation, as well as opposing the war with the American colonies. He sat in Parliament from 1780 to 1784 and became a lord of the treasury in the Portland cabinet in 1783. He succeeded to the title of 11th Duke of Norfolk in 1786 upon the death of his father. Eventually, he was dismissed from the lord lieutenancy of the West Riding in 1798 for toasting "Our sovereign’s health—the majesty of the people" in terms displeasing to George III.

Norfolk wrote Historical Anecdotes of some of the Howard Family (1769 and 1817). He was a good friend of Sir Bysshe Shelley, allowing him in 1786 to make out the patent for his baronetcy. Shelley was influenced by Norfolk and built the flamboyant Castle Goring, one side of which was a partial copy of Norfolk's residence of Arundel Castle.

Norfolk died on 16 December 1815 at age 69, without issue from either of his two legal marriages. Upon his death, his lands and titles passed to his 4th cousin, Bernard.

He was noted for his convivial habits and his dislike of soap and water. It was said that his servants would wait for him to fall asleep and then douse him with water. In his Confessions of an English Opium-Eater, Thomas De Quincey refers to him as saying, "Next Monday, wind and weather permitting, I purpose to be drunk."

== Family tree ==
Family tree of the Dukes of Norfolk and Suke of Surrey; Earls of Arundel, East Anglia, Norfolk, Norwich, Nottingham, and Surrey; and Barons Mowbray, Segrave and Stourton

Earl of East Anglia (Earls of Norfolk and Suffolk) (1st creation), before 1069
Ralph the Staller c. 1011–1068; 1st Earl of Norfolk and Suffolk, or of the East Angles (c. 1066/67–1068)
Earl of Surrey (1st creation), c. 1088
Ralph de Gael c. 1040 – c. 1096; 2nd Earl of Norfolk and Suffolk, or of the East Angles (until 1074)	Roger Bigod of Norfolk d. 1107	William de Warenne c. 1035–1088; 1st Earl (of) Warenne / Earl of Surrey, Lord of Lewes, Seigneur de Varennes
Earldom forfeit, 1074
Earl of Norfolk (2nd creation), 1141
King Henry I c. 1068–1135	Maud Bigod	Hugh Bigod; 1095–1177; 1st Earl of Norfolk (1141–1177)	William de Warenne d. 1138; 2nd Earl (of) Warenne / Earl of Surrey
Earl of Arundel, Earl of Sussex (1st creations), c. 1138
Empress Matilda c. 1102–1167	Geoffrey Plantagenet; 1113–1251; Count of Anjou	Adeliza of Louvain c. 1103–1151	William d'Aubigny c. 1109–1176; 1st Earl of Arundel, Earl of Sussex, Earl of Lincoln	William de Warenne; 1119–1148; 3rd Earl of Surrey
King Henry II; 1133–1189	William d'Aubigny b. c. 1138/1150–1176; 2nd Earl of Arundel, Earl of Sussex	Roger Bigod c. 1144/1150–1221; 2nd Earl of Norfolk (1189–1221, disputed 1177–1189)	William of Blois c. 1137–1159	Isabel de Warenne c. 1130 – 1203; 4th Countess of Surrey suo jure	Hamelin de Warenne c. 1130–1202; Comte de Warenne / Earl of Surrey, jure uxoris
King John; 1166/1167–1216	William d'Aubigny before 1180–1221; 3rd Earl of Arundel, Earl of Sussex	Hugh Bigod; 1186–1225; 3rd Earl of Norfolk (1221–1225)	Maud Marshal; 1192–1248	William de Warenne c. 1160s/1170s–1240 5th Earl of Surrey
William d'Aubigny c. 1203–before 1224; 4th Earl of Arundel, Earl of Sussex	Hugh d'Aubigny d. 1243; 5th Earl of Arundel, Earl of Sussex	Isabel d'Aubigny	John Fitzalan; 1200–1240; 3rd Lord of Clun and Oswestry	Roger Bigod c. 1209–1270; 4th Earl of Norfolk (1233–1270)	Hugh Bigod c. 1211–1266
King Henry III; 1207–1272	John Fitzalan; 1223–1267; 6th Earl of Arundel, Earl of Sussex, jure matris	John de Warenne; 1231–1304; 6th Earl of Surrey
Baron Segrave of Se(a)grave, 1283
Nicholas Segrave c. 1238–bef. 1295; 1st Baron Segrave	King Edward I 1239–1307	Edmund Crouchback; 1245–1296; Earl of Lancaster	John Fitzalan; 1246–1272; 7th Earl of Arundel, Earl of Sussex, jure matris	Roger Bigod c. 1245–1306; 5th Earl of Norfolk (1270–1306)
Earldom extinct, 1270
Baron Mowbray, 1283	Earl of Arundel (2nd (1st by writ) creation), 1289
John Segrave c. 1256–1325; 2nd Baron Segrave	Roger de Mowbray; 1254–1297; 1st Baron Mowbray	Richard Fitzalan; 1267–1302; 1st (or 6th) Earl of Arundel	William de Warenne; 1256–1286
Earl of Norfolk (3rd creation), 1312
Stephen Segrave d. 1325; 3rd Baron Segrave	Thomas of Brotherton; 1300–1338; 1st Earl of Norfolk (1312–1338)	John Mowbray; 1286–1322; 2nd Baron Mowbray	Henry c. 1281–1345; Earl of Leicester, Earl of Lancaster	Edmund Fitzalan; 1286–1326; 2nd (or 7th) Earl of Arundel	Alice de Warenne; 1287–1388 heir apparent to the Earldom of Surrey	John de Warenne; 1286–1347; 7th Earl of Surrey
Earldom of Arundel (2nd creation) forfeit, 1326
Earldom of Arundel (2nd creation) restored, 1331
John Segrave; 1315–1353; 4th Baron Segrave	Margaret of Brotherton; 1320–1399; 2nd Countess of Norfolk (1338–1399), Duchess of Norfolk "for life" (1397–1399)	John Mowbray; 1310–1361; 3rd Baron Mowbray	Joan of Lancaster c. 1312–1349	Eleanor of Lancaster; 1318–1372	Richard FitzAlan c. 1313–1376; 3rd (or 8th) Earl of Arundel, 8th Earl of Surrey
Baron Arundel, 1377
Elizabeth de Segrave; 1338–1368; 5th Baroness Segrave	John de Mowbray; 1340–1368; 4th Baron Mowbray	Richard FitzAlan; 1346–1397; 4th (or 9th) Earl of Arundel, 9th Earl of Surrey	John FitzAlan c. 1348–1379; 1st Baron Arundel	Alice FitzAlan
Earldom of Arundel (2nd creation) forfeit, 1397
Earl of Nottingham (1st creation), 1377	Earl of Nottingham (2nd creation), 1383; Duke of Norfolk (1st creation), 1397	Duke of Surrey, 1397
John de Mowbray; 1365–1383; 1st Earl of Nottingham, 6th Baron Segrave, 5th Baron Mowbray	Thomas de Mowbray; 1366–1399; 1st Duke of Norfolk (1397–1399), 3rd Earl of Norfolk (1399), 7th Baron Segrave, 6th Baron Mowbray	Elizabeth Fitzalan; 1366–1425	John FitzAlan; 1364–1390; 2nd Baron Arundel	Thomas Holland; 1372–1400; Duke of Surrey, Earl of Kent, Baron Holland
Earldom of Nottingham extinct, 1383	Titles forfeit, 1399	Dukedom of Surrey renounced, 1400
Baron Stourton, 1448	Duke of Norfolk (1st creation restored), 1425	Earldom of Arundel (2nd creation) restored, 1400
John Stourton; 1400–1462; 1st Baron Stourton (1448–1462)	Thomas de Mowbray; 1385–1405; 4th Earl of Norfolk, 8th Baron Segrave, 7th Baron Mowbray (1399–1405)	John de Mowbray; 1392–1432; 2nd Duke of Norfolk (1425–1432), 5th Earl of Norfolk, 9th Baron Segrave, 8th Baron Mowbray (1405–1432)	Margaret de Mowbray c. 1388–1459	Robert Howard; 1385–1436	Isabel de Mowbray c. 1400–1452	Thomas FitzAlan; 1381–1415; 5th (or 10th) Earl of Arundel, 10th Earl of Surrey	John Fitzalan; 1385–1421; 6th (or 11th) Earl of Arundel, 3rd Baron Arundel, 3rd Baron Maltravers
Duke of Norfolk (4th creation), 1483
William Stourton before 1426–1478; 2nd Baron Stourton (1462–1478)	John de Mowbray; 1415–1461; 3rd Duke of Norfolk, 6th Earl of Norfolk, 10th Baron Segrave, 9th Baron Mowbray (1432–1461)	John Howard; 1425–1485; 1st Duke of Norfolk, 13th Baron Segrave, 12th Baron Mowbray (1483–1485)	John Fitzalan; 1408–1435; 7th (or 12th) Earl of Arundel, 4th Baron Arundel, 4th Baron Maltravers	William Fitzalan; 1417–1487; 9th (or 14th) Earl of Arundel, 6th Baron Arundel, 6th Baron Maltravers
Titles forfeit, 1485
Earl of Surrey (2nd creation), 1451	Duke of Norfolk (4th creation) restored and Earl of Surrey, 1514
John Stourton c. 1454–1485; 3rd Baron Stourton (1479–1485)	William Stourton c. 1457–1524; 5th Baron Stourton (1487–1524)	John de Mowbray; 1444–1476; 4th Duke of Norfolk, 7th Earl of Norfolk, Earl of Surrey, 11th Baron Segrave, 10th Baron Mowbray (1461–1476)	King Edward IV; 1442–1483	Thomas Howard; 1443–1524; 2nd Duke of Norfolk, 1st Earl of Surrey (1514–1524)	Humfrey Fitzalan; 1429–1438; 8th (or 13th) Earl of Arundel, 5th Baron Arundel, 5th Baron Maltravers	Thomas Fitzalan; 1450–1524; 10th (or 15th) Earl of Arundel, 7th Baron Arundel, 7th Baron Maltravers
Dukedom of Norfolk, Earldom of Nottingham, Earldom of Surrey extinct, 1476
Duke of Norfolk (3rd creation), Earl of Nottingham (3rd creation), and Earl of Surrey, 1477
Francis Stourton; 1485–1487; 4th Baron Stourton (1485–1487)	Edward Stourton; 1463–1535; 6th Baron Stourton (1524–1535)	Anne de Mowbray; 1472–1481; 8th Countess of Norfolk, 12th Baroness Segrave, 11th Baroness Mowbray (1476–1481)	Richard of Shrewsbury; 1473–1483; Duke of York, Duke of Norfolk, Earl of Nottingham, Earl of Warenne (1477–1483)	Anne of York; 1475–1511	Thomas Howard; 1473–1554; 3rd Duke of Norfolk, 2nd Earl of Surrey (1524–1554)	Edmund Howard c. 1478–1539	Elizabeth Boleyn c. 1480–1538	William Fitzalan; 1476–1544; 11th (or 16th) Earl of Arundel, 8th Baron Arundel, 8th Baron Maltravers
Earldom of Norfolk extinct and Baronies Segrave and Mowbray in abeyance, 1481	Dukedom of Norfolk, Earldom of Nottingham, Earldom of Surrey extinct, 1483	Attainted, 1547; Restored, 1553
William Stourton c. 1505–1548; 7th Baron Stourton	Earl of Nottingham (5th creation), 1525	King Henry VIII; 1491–1547	Anne Boleyn c. 1501 or 1507–1536
Viscount Howard of Bindon, 1559
Charles Stourton c. 1520–1557; 8th Baron Stourton	Henry Howard; 1517–1547 styled Earl of Surrey	Thomas Howard c. 1520–1582; 1st Viscount Howard of Bindon	Mary FitzRoy; 1519–1557	Henry FitzRoy; 1519–1536; Duke of Richmond and Somerset, Earl of Nottingham	Catherine Howard c. 1524–1542	Henry Fitzalan; 1512–1580; 12th (or 17th) Earl of Arundel, 9th Baron Arundel, 9th Baron Maltravers
Earldom of Nottingham extinct, 1536
Thomas Howard; 1536–1572; 4th Duke of Norfolk, 3rd Earl of Surrey, 13th Baron Mowbray (1554–1572)	Henry Howard; 1540–1614; Earl of Northampton	Queen Elizabeth I 1533–1603	Mary FitzAlan; 1540–1557
Dukedom (3rd creation) forfeit, 1572
Earl of Arundel (3rd creation), 1580	Earl of Suffolk (4th creation), 1603
John Stourton; 1553–1588; 9th Baron Stourton	Edward Stourton c. 1555–1633; 10th Baron Stourton	Philip Howard; 1557–1595; 20th/13th/1st Earl of Arundel, styled Earl of Surrey	Thomas Howard; 1561–1626; Earl of Suffolk	Lord William Howard; 1563–1640
Earldom of Arundel and Barony of Mowbray attainted, 1589	see Earls, Marquesses, and Dukes of Suffolk family tree
Earl of Arundel (3rd creation) and Barony of Mowbray restored, 1604; Earl of Norfolk (5th creation), 1644
William Stourton c. 1594–1672; 11th Baron Stourton	Thomas Howard; 1585–1646; 21st/14th/2nd Earl of Arundel, 2nd/4th Earl of Surrey, 1st Earl of Norfolk, 14th Baron Mowbray (1644–1646)	Philip
see Earls of Shrewsbury family tree
Edward Stourton; 1617–1644	Henry Frederick Howard; 1608–1652; 22nd/15th/3rd Earl of Arundel, 3rd/5th Earl of Surrey, 2nd Earl of Norfolk, 15th Baron Mowbray (1646–1652)	Alethea Howard; 1585–1654; 17th Baroness Strange of Blackmere, 14th Baroness Talbot, 13th Baroness Furnivall	William Howard; 1614–1680; 1st Viscount Stafford	William
Duke of Norfolk (4th creation restored), 1660	Baron Howard of Castle Rising, 1669; Earl of Norwich (3rd creation), 1672
William Stourton d. 1685; 12th Baron Stourton	Thomas Howard; 1627–1677; 5th Duke of Norfolk, 21st/14th/2nd Earl of Arundel, 4th/6th Earl of Surrey, 16th Baron Mowbray (1660–1677); 18th Baron Strange of Blackmere, 15th Baron Talbot, 14th Baron Furnivall (1654–1677)	Henry Howard; 1628–1684; 6th Duke of Norfolk, 22nd/15th/3rd Earl of Arundel, 5th/7th Earl of Surrey, 1st Earl of Norwich, etc. 18th Baron Strange of Blackmere, 17th Baron Mowbray, 15th Baron Talbot, 14th Baron Furnivall (1672–1684)	Charles Howard; 1630–1713	Col. Bernard Howard; 1641–1717	Charles Howard, 1st Earl of Carlisle Earls of Carlisle
Edward Stourton; 1665–1720; 13th Baron Stourton	Thomas Stourton; 1667–1744; 14th Baron Stourton	Charles Stourton; 1669–1739	Henry Howard; 1655–1701; 7th Duke of Norfolk, 22nd/15th/3rd Earl of Arundel, 5th/7th Earl of Surrey, 2nd Earl of Norwich, etc. 18th Baron Mowbray, 19th Baron Strange of Blackmere, 15th Baron Talbot, 14th Baron Furnivall (1684–1701)	Lord Thomas Howard; 1662–1689	Henry Charles Howard d. 1720
Thomas Howard; 1683–1732; 8th Duke of Norfolk, 23rd/16th/4th Earl of Arundel, 6th/8th Earl of Surrey, 3rd Earl of Norwich, etc. 18th Baron Strange of Blackmere, 15th Baron Talbot, 14th Baron Furnivall, 19th Baron Mowbray (1701–1732)	Edward Howard; 1685–1777; 9th Duke of Norfolk, 24th/17th/5th Earl of Arundel, 7th/9th Earl of Surrey, 4th Earl of Norwich, etc. 20th Baron Mowbray, 20th Baron Strange of Blackmere, 15th Baron Talbot, 14th Baron Furnivall (1732–1777)	Philip Howard; 1688–1750	Bernard Howard; 1674–1735
Earldom of Norwich (3rd creation) and Barony of Howard of Castle Rising extinct and Baronies of Furnivall, Mowbray, Segrave, Strange of Blackmere, and Talbot abeyant, 1777
Charles Stourton; 1702–1753; 15th Baron Stourton	William Stourton; 1704–1781; 16th Baron Stourton	Winifred Howard; 1726–1753	Anne Howard; 1742–1787	Charles Howard; 1720–1786; 10th Duke of Norfolk, 25th/18th/6th Earl of Arundel, 8th/10th Earl of Surrey (1777–1786)	Henry Howard; 1713–1787
Charles Philip Stourton; 1752–1816; 17th Baron Stourton	Charles Howard; 1746–1815; 11th Duke of Norfolk, 26th/19th/7th Earl of Arundel, 9th/11th Earl of Surrey (1786–1815)
William Stourton; 1776–1846; 18th Baron Stourton	Bernard Howard; 1765–1842; 12th Duke of Norfolk, 27th/20th/8th Earl of Arundel, 10th/12th Earl of Surrey (1815–1842)
Charles Stourton; 1802–1872; 19th Baron Stourton	Henry Howard; 1791–1856; 13th Duke of Norfolk, 28th/21st/9th Earl of Arundel, 11th/13th Earl of Surrey (1842–1856)
Baron Mowbray and Baron Segrave abeayance restored, 1878	Baron Howard of Glossop
Alfred Joseph Stourton; 1829–1893; 24th Baron Segrave, 21st/23rd Baron Mowbray, 20th Baron Stourton	Henry Granville Fitzalan-Howard; 1815–1860; 14th Duke of Norfolk, 29th/22nd/10th Earl of Arundel, 12th/14th Earl of Surrey (1856–1860)	Edward George Fitzalan-Howard; 1818–1883; 1st Baron Howard of Glossop
Charles Botolph Joseph Stourton; 1867–1936; 25th Baron Segrave, 22nd/24th Baron Mowbray, 21st Baron Stourton	Henry Fitzalan-Howard; 1847–1917; 15th Duke of Norfolk, 30th/23rd/11th Earl of Arundel, 13th/15th Earl of Surrey, Lord Maltravers, Earl of Arundel and Surrey (1860–1917)	Francis Fitzalan-Howard; 1859–1924; 2nd Baron Howard of Glossop
William Marmaduke Stourton; 1895–1965; 26th Baron Segrave, 23rd/25th Baron Mowbray, 22nd Baron Stourton	Bernard Fitzalan-Howard; 1908–1975; 16th Duke of Norfolk, 31st/24th/12th Earl of Arundel, 14th/16th Earl of Surrey (1917–1975)	Bernard Fitzalan-Howard; 1885–1972; 3rd Baron Howard of Glossop
Charles Edward Stourton; 1923–2006; 27th Baron Segrave, 24th/26th Baron Mowbray, 23rd Baron Stourton	Miles Fitzalan-Howard; 1915–2002; 17th Duke of Norfolk, 32nd/25th/13th Earl of Arundel, 15th/17th Earl of Surrey, 4th Baron Howard of Glossop (1975–2002)
Edward William Stephen Stourton; 1953–2021; 28th Baron Segrave, 25th/27th Baron Mowbray, 24th Baron Stourton	Edward Fitzalan-Howard b. 1956; 18th Duke of Norfolk, 33rd/26th/14th Earl of Arundel, 16th/18th Earl of Surrey, 5th Baron Howard of Glossop (from 2002)
James Charles Peter Stourton b. 1991; 29th Baron Segrave, 26th/28th Baron Mowbray, 25th Baron Stourton	Henry Fitzalan-Howard b. 1987 styled Earl of Arundel and Surrey

== Notes ==
Parliament of Great Britain
Preceded by Anthony Storer; Walter Spencer-Stanhope	Member of Parliament for Carlisle; 1780–1786; With: William Lowther 1780–1784; Edward Norton 1784–1786; John Lowther 1786; John Christian 1786	Succeeded by John Christian; Edward Knubley
Preceded by Thomas Fitzherbert; Peter William Baker	Member of Parliament for Arundel; 1784–1784; With: Thomas Fitzherbert	Succeeded by Thomas Fitzherbert; Richard Beckford
Political offices
Preceded by The Earl of Effingham	Deputy Earl Marshal; 1782–1786	Vacant
Preceded by The Duke of Norfolk	Earl Marshal; 1786–1815	Succeeded by The Duke of Norfolk
Honorary titles
Preceded by The Marquess of Rockingham	Lord Lieutenant of the West Riding of Yorkshire; 1782–1798	Succeeded by The Earl FitzWilliam
Preceded by The Duke of Richmond	Lord Lieutenant of Sussex; 1807–1815	Succeeded by The Duke of Richmond
Peerage of England
Preceded by Charles Howard	Duke of Norfolk; 1786–1815	Succeeded by Bernard Howard
