= Blanche Lyon Pursuivant =

Blanche Lyon Pursuivant of Arms in Ordinary (sometimes Blanch Lyon) was an English office of arms created during the reign of King Edward IV.

The title was then taken from the white lion of the Mortimer Earls of March, one of King Edward's favourite royal badges. The title lapsed under Henry VII, but it was revived in 1537. Its status was then anomalous, for although John James was described as 'Our pursuivant' and was granted a salary by the Crown, he was expressly said to be with the Duke of Norfolk and in the College of Arms he was counted as an extraordinary. The title in this case clearly refers to the white lion rampant, which was at once arms, crest and badge of the House of Mowbray and which, with a crown about its neck, is now one of the Duke of Norfolk's supporters. Among the later incumbents a white lion was incorporated in the armorial insignia of Walker, and Rogers-Harrison.

In 1602, the office was made "extraordinary" for the appointment of Francis Thynne, before his promotion to Lancaster Herald of Arms in Ordinary that same year. Nicholas Charles held the post. John Philipot was created Blanche Lyon Pursuivant of Arms Extraordinary in 1613, and William Dugdale followed in 1638.

In 1784, Sir Isaac Heard had his step-son, Alexander Ochterlony, appointed Blanche Lyon. Ochterlony was the first of only two known American-born officers of arms in British history. The other was York Herald of Arms John von Sonnentag de Havilland

== Holders of the office ==
Arms	Name	Date of appointment	Ref
	John James	1537–1539	
	Francis Thynne	1602–1602	
	Nicholas Charles	1603–1609	
	John Philipot	1613–1618	
	John Hamelin	1624–1635	
	Edward Walker	1635–1637	
	William Dugdale	1638–1640	
	Robert Browne	1640–1641	
	Charles Mawson	1680–1686	
	Thomas Holford	1686–1687	
	Hugh Clopton	1690–1700	
	Robert Dale	1694–1707	
	John Dugdale	1707–1713	
	Arthur Shepherd	1719–1720	
	Thomas Browne	1727–1737	
	Alexander Ochterlony	1784–1803	
	George Harrison Rogers-Harrison	1831	

== See also ==
- Heraldry
- Officer of arms
