= George Frederick Beltz =

British genealogist (1774–1841)

George Frederick Beltz, KH (9 August 1774 – 23 October 1841) was an English genealogist, appointed Lancaster Herald in 1822.

== Life ==
Beltz was the second of seven children of George Nicholas Beltz of St George's, Bloomsbury, a coal merchant, and Elizabeth Gutteridge (died 1796). From at least 1797 to 1816 he worked in the office of the Garter King of Arms. He became gentleman usher of the scarlet rod of the Order of the Bath and Brunswick Herald in 1814, in succession to Sir Isaac Heard.

In 1813, he was secretary to the mission sent to invest Alexander I of Russia with the Order of the Garter, and in 1814 he performed a similar office at the investiture of Francis I of Austria. After being Portcullis Pursuivant from 1817 to 1822, he was appointed Lancaster Herald. In 1826, he was made a companion of the Royal Hanoverian Guelphic Order, of which order he was honoured with knighthood in 1836. Beltz, who was an executor for the widow of David Garrick, wrote a memoir of Mrs. Garrick in the Gentleman's Magazine for November 1822, and he contributed papers on archaeological subjects to the Gentleman's Magazine (1822), to the Retrospective Review (1823), and the volumes, xxv., xxvii., and xxviii. of the Archæologia of the Society of Antiquaries (1833–39). Many of the elaborate pedigrees in Sir R. C. Hoare's History of Wiltshire were compiled by him.

In 1834, he published, in an octavo volume, A Review of the Chandos Peerage Case. In 1841, he published Memorials of the Order of the Garter, from its Foundation to the Present Time. He was engaged in this work during many years, and only survived its publication by a few months. He was attacked by his last illness while on a tour on the continent, and died at Basel on 28 October 1841, aged 67, and was interred in the cemetery of the parish of St. Peter there.

Heraldic offices
Preceded by John Doddington Forth	Portcullis Pursuivant; 1817–1822	Succeeded by James Pulman
Preceded by Edmund Lodge	Lancaster Herald; 1822–1841	Succeeded by Sir Albert Woods
Preceded by Isaac Heard	Brunswick Herald; 1814–1841	Succeeded by Sir Albert Woods
