= Susan Ridge =

British Army officer and lawyer

Major General Susan Ridge CB
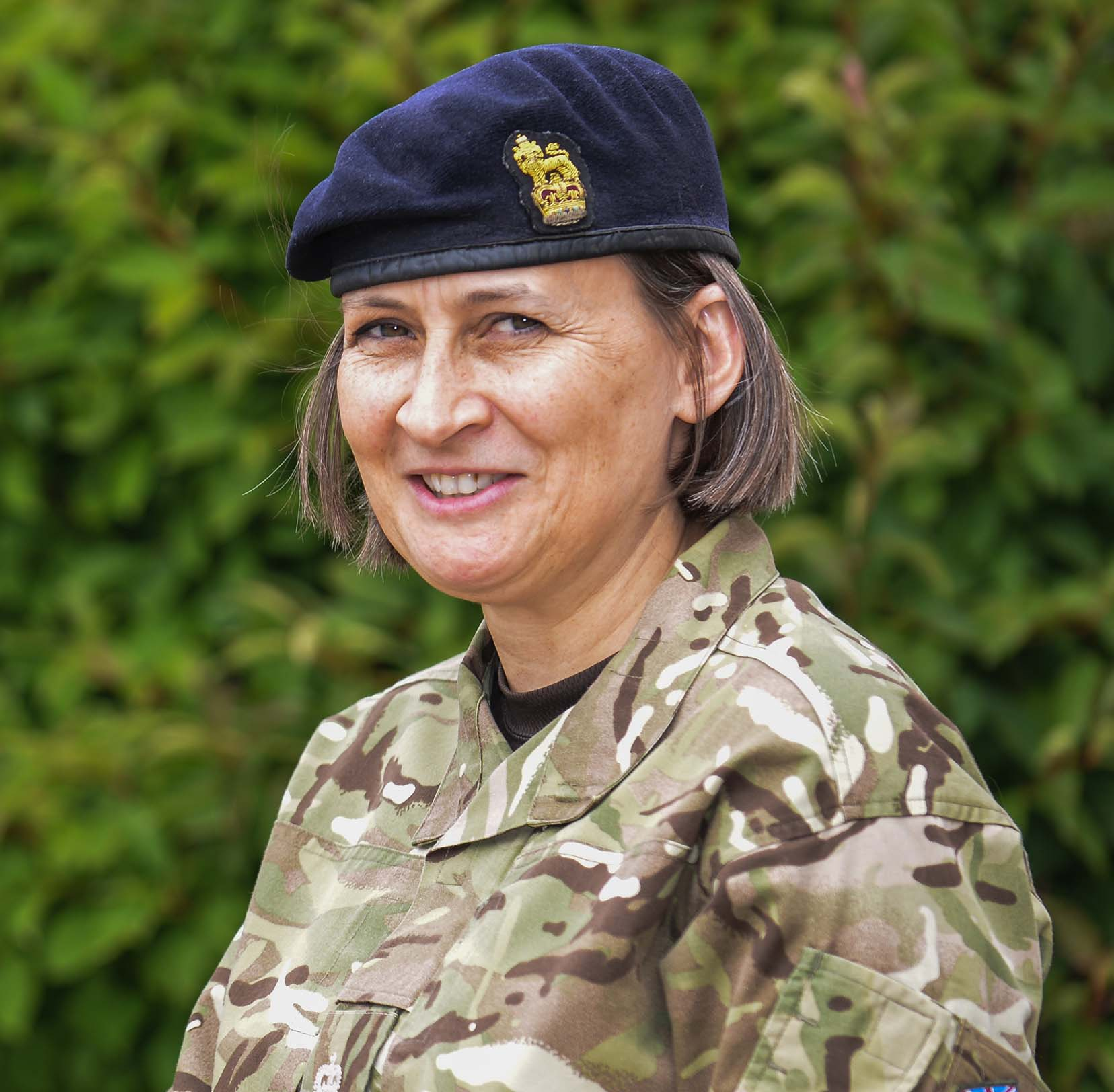
- Military career
- Allegiance: United Kingdom
- Branch: British Army
- Service years: 1992–2019
- Rank: Major General
- Service number: 539391
- Awards: Companion of the Order of the Bath

Major General Susan Kerstin Ridge, CB (born 1962 or 1963) is a retired senior British Army officer and lawyer. From September 2015 to July 2019, she was Director General of the Army Legal Services Branch (DGALS). She was the first woman to hold the rank of major general in the British Army and the first to hold non-honorary general officer rank since the Second World War.

== Early life and education ==
Ridge was raised in the west of England and educated in Chester, Cheshire. She studied history at Bangor University, graduating in 1984. She then completed a law conversion course at the College of Law, Chester Campus.

In 1989, Ridge qualified as a solicitor after working as an articled clerk, and was admitted to the Law Society of England and Wales. She worked as a lawyer at Swayne Johnson Wright in north Wales from 1986 to 1992, and specialised in real estate law.

== Military career ==
Ridge joined the British Army on a short service commission in February 1992. She became a captain in the Army Legal Services Branch of the Adjutant General's Corps, shortly before the Women's Royal Army Corps was dissolved.

She was promoted to the rank of major on 26 February 1996, to lieutenant colonel on 26 February 2002, to colonel on 30 June 2008, and to brigadier on 30 June 2012.

On 20 September 2015, she was promoted to major general and appointed Director-General of the Army Legal Services Branch. In the 2019 New Year Honours, she was appointed a Companion of the Order of the Bath (CB).

Ridge was succeeded by Major-General Alexander Taylor as Director-General, Army Legal Services on 5 July 2019. Ridge retired from the British Army on 18 October 2019.

She was appointed Lady Usher of the Scarlet Rod of the Most Honourable Order of the Bath in June 2023.

== Personal life ==
Her husband is also an army officer. They have one son.

In 2016, she was made an Honorary Fellow of Bangor University "for services to Law".

== See also ==
- Air Vice-Marshal Elaine West; first woman promoted to two-star rank in the British Armed Forces

Military offices
Preceded by Michael Conway	Director General of the Army Legal Services Branch; 2015–2019	Succeeded by Alexander Taylor
Court offices
Preceded by Major General James Gordon	Lady Usher of the Scarlet Rod; 2023–Present	Incumbent
