= James Gordon (British Army officer, born 1957) =

British Army general

Major General James Gordon CB CBE
- Born: 4 December 1957 (age 68)
- Military career
- Allegiance: United Kingdom
- Branch: British Army
- Service years: 1975–2014
- Rank: Major General
- Commands: British Forces Cyprus; British Forces in the Falkland Islands; 2nd Battalion Royal Green Jackets
- Conflicts: Iraq War
- Awards: Companion of the Order of the Bath; Commander of the Order of the British Empire

Major General James Henry Gordon, CB, CBE (born 4 December 1957) is a former British Army officer who served as Commander British Forces Cyprus from 2008 to 2010.

== Military career ==
Educated at Glenalmond College, Gordon was commissioned into the Royal Green Jackets in 1975. He became commanding officer of 2nd Battalion Royal Green Jackets in 1995, Deputy Assistant Chief of Staff (Operational Support) at the Permanent Joint Headquarters in 1998, and Commander British Forces in the Falkland Islands in 2002. He went on to be Chief of Staff at HQ Northern Ireland in 2003, Deputy Commander at the Multi-National Security Transition Command – Iraq in 2006 and Director of Personnel Services (Army) at the Ministry of Defence in early 2008. His last appointments were as Commander British Forces Cyprus and Administrator of the Sovereign Base Areas in October 2008, and as Senior British Loan Services Officer in Oman in January 2011 before retiring in August 2014.

He was Gentleman Usher of the Scarlet Rod from 2018 to June 2023, when he became Registrar and Secretary of the Most Honourable Order of the Bath.

Military offices
Preceded by Richard Lacey	Commander British Forces Cyprus; 2008–2010	Succeeded by Graham Stacey
Court offices
Preceded by Major General Charles Vyvyan	Gentleman Usher of the Scarlet Rod; 2018–2023	Succeeded by Major General Susan Ridge
