= Gordon Risius =

British Army officer

Major-General Gordon Risius, CB (born 10 July 1945) is a former senior British Army officer and lawyer who served as Director of the Army Legal Services Branch.

== Career ==
Born on 10 July 1945 to Rudolf Risius and his wife Irene, née Spier, Risius studied at the College of Law and was admitted a solicitor in 1972. He was commissioned into the Army Legal Corps (later the Army Legal Services Branch) as a captain with seniority from 1973. He was promoted to major in 1978 and lieutenant-colonel in 1983, serving the Headquarters of the British Land Forces in Hong Kong, the British Army of the Rhine, Northern Ireland, the Ministry of Defence, the 4th Armoured Division and the British Land Forces in Cyprus. He was promoted to colonel in 1992, and served at the Ministry of Defence. He was promoted to Brigadier in 1994; he was Brigadier Legal at the Headquarters of the British Army of the Rhine until 1995, then the same at the Headquarters of the Land Command until 1996 and, finally, he was Brigadier Prosecutions in 1997. That year, he was appointed Director of the Army Legal Services Branch and promoted to the rank of Major-General. He was appointed a Companion of the Order of the Bath in the 2000 Birthday Honours and ceased to be Director in 2003.

Outside of the military, Risius was appointed an Assistant Recorder in 1991 and a Recorder in 1995. In 2003, he was appointed a Circuit Judge and in that year became a Vice-President of the Immigration Appeal Tribunal, serving until 2005; he was a Senior Judge in the Sovereign Base Areas Court in Cyprus between 2007 and 2014, and was also a Judge at Oxford Crown Court from 2010 to 2014, when he also retired as a Circuit Judge. Since 2003, he has been Honorary President of the International Society for Military Law and the Law of War. Since 1980, he has been married to Lucinda Mary, daughter of Marshal of the Royal Air Force Sir Michael Beetham.
