= Graham Stacey =

Air Marshal Sir Graham Stacey KBE CB
- Born: 1 September 1959 (age 67); London, England
- Military career
- Allegiance: United Kingdom
- Branch: Royal Air Force
- Service years: 1980–2019
- Rank: Air Marshal
- Commands: British Forces Cyprus; ISAF 1 Detachment; RAF Honington
- Conflicts: Operation Southern Watch; Kosovo Force; War in Afghanistan; Iraq War
- Awards: Knight Commander of the Order of the British Empire; Companion of the Order of the Bath; Queen's Commendation for Valuable Service

Air Marshal Sir Graham Edward Stacey, KBE, CB (born 1 September 1959) is a retired senior Royal Air Force officer who served as Chief of Staff, Allied Command Transformation.

== Early life and education ==
Stacey was born on 1 September 1959 in London, England. He was educated at Epsom College, a public school in Surrey. He studied at the University of Leeds (BSc chemistry) and King's College London (MA).

== Air Force career ==
Stacey joined the Royal Air Force (RAF) in 1980. Much of his early career spent was focusing on air defence, including tours in the Falkland Islands and Belize, and loan service with the Indonesian Army. He later commanded a surface-to-air missile squadron in Yorkshire as a squadron leader, and served as a Liaison Officer at the Defence Research Agency. There he worked within the Counter-Terrorist Explosives Detection and Countermeasures field, and was a desk officer in the Ministry of Defence Joint Service Operational Requirements branch.

Stacey attended the Staff College, Camberley in 1994 and upon completion of the course was posted as a policy and programmes staff officer with the rank of wing commander. He spent 10 months on the staff of the High Representative for Bosnia and Herzegovina, Carl Bildt, in 1997, and then in 1998 he took command of No. 1 Royal Air Force Tactical Survive to Operate (Force Protection) Headquarters.

As commander of the aforementioned Headquarters, Stacey completed two Southern Watch tours in Iraq and led the establishment of the RAF Detachment at Ali al Salem, Kuwait. He was later attached to HQ UK 4 Armoured Brigade, and deployed with forward elements on day one of the NATO Kosovo Land Campaign, in preparation for the Headquarters providing the framework organisation for the activation and running of the KFOR airfield at Pristina, Kosovo.

Stacey was promoted to group captain in 1999 and he took up the post of assistant director within the Directorate of Joint Warfare, Ministry of Defence. In 2001 he took command of RAF Honington. While base commander he took a mid-term 4-month "sabbatical" to command the multinational ISAF 1 Detachment at Kabul Airfield in Afghanistan. In June 2003 Stacey took up the post of Deputy Senior British Military Representative (Iraq) based within CJTF 7 in Baghdad.

During his time in Iraq Stacey was promoted to air commodore. In 2004 he attended the Royal College of Defence Studies. He was then appointed as ACOS J7/Director Joint Warfare Training Centre within the UK's Permanent Joint Headquarters.

Stacey attended the UK Higher Command and Staff Course in January 2007 before joining NATO Joint Force Command Brunssum to lead the J3 Ops Division. In December 2008 he was promoted to air vice marshal and joined USCENTCOM (Tampa) in February 2009 as Senior British Military Advisor to General David Petraeus and the HQ. On 5 November 2010, he was appointed Commander British Forces Cyprus and Administrator of the Sovereign Base Areas.

Stacey returned to Brunssum as Deputy Commander on 15 January 2013.

Stacey was appointed a Member of the Order of the British Empire (MBE) for services in Indonesia, was awarded the Queen's Commendation for Valuable Service for Operation Desert Fox, was appointed a Companion of the Order of the Bath (CB) in 2011, and was appointed a Knight Commander of the Order of the British Empire (KBE) in the 2017 New Year Honours.

== Personal life ==
Stacey is married to Maria Stuttaford, an academic specialising in health and human rights issues. He has two children, Fiona and Gavin. His interests include cycling, walking, squash, cooking and rugby and he is an ex-Chairman of RAF and CS Rugby and ex Service Vice President of the Royal Air Forces Association (European and Overseas Area).

Military offices
Preceded by James Gordon	Commander British Forces Cyprus; 2010–2012	Succeeded by Richard Cripwell
