= Richard Lacey =

British Royal Air Force officer

Air Vice-Marshal Richard Lacey CBE LVO
- Born: 11 December 1953 (age 72)
- Military career
- Allegiance: United Kingdom
- Branch: Royal Air Force
- Service years: 1972–2009
- Rank: Air Vice-Marshal
- Commands: British Forces Cyprus; British Forces Falkland Islands; RAF Benson; No. 33 Squadron
- Conflicts: Gulf War
- Awards: Commander of the Order of the British Empire; Lieutenant of the Royal Victorian Order

Air Vice-Marshal Richard Howard Lacey CBE LVO (born 11 December 1953) is a retired Royal Air Force officer who served as the Commander of British Forces Cyprus and UK National Military Representative to the NATO HQ at SHAPE in Belgium.

== Education ==
Lacey was educated at John Ruskin Grammar School, University of Cambridge, the RAF College Cranwell and the Royal College of Defence Studies.

== Flying career ==
Lacey joined the Royal Air Force (RAF) in 1972. He qualified as a helicopter pilot in 1978 and completed operational flying tours in Northern Ireland and Hong Kong. He trained as a helicopter flying instructor in 1984 and on promotion to squadron leader in 1985, he returned to operational flying in Northern Ireland as a Flight Commander with No 72 Squadron. After attending the RAF Staff College he was appointed Personal Staff Officer to Chief of Staff at RAF Strike Command (then Commander-in-Chief for the Gulf War) in 1989. He became Commanding Officer of No. 33 Squadron in 1992, a staff officer for Air Plans and Programmes at the Ministry of Defence in 1994 and Station Commander at RAF Benson in 1997. After that he attended the Royal College of Defence Studies whereupon he was made Director of NATO Policy at the Ministry of Defence in 2000, Commander of British Forces on the Falkland Islands in 2003 and UK Military Representative to SHAPE in Belgium in 2005. Lacey was appointed a Commander of the Order of the British Empire in the 2004 New Year Honours. His last appointment was as Commander of British Forces Cyprus and Administrator of the Sovereign Base Areas in 2006 before retiring in 2009. He was appointed a Lieutenant of the Royal Victorian Order in the 2024 New Year Honours.

== Retirement ==
After retirement, Lacey became Director of Strategy at Sodexo Defence Ltd. He previously served as a Gentleman Usher to King Charles III.

Military offices
Preceded by Peter Pearson	Commander British Forces Cyprus; 2006–2008	Succeeded by James Gordon
