= Nicholas Charles =

English officer of arms

- Died: 1613

Nicholas Charles or Carles (died 1613) was an English officer of arms, who served as Lancaster Herald from 1609 to 1613. He made a copy of an early and rare 13th-century roll of arms, the original of which is now lost, known after him as "Charles's Roll".

== Life ==
Charles, according to Mark Noble, was the son of George Carles, a London butcher. At an early age he entered the College of Arms as Blanche Lyon Pursuivant; on 21 April 1609 he was created Lancaster Herald in the place of Francis Thynne. In 1611 he accompanied Richard St George, Norroy King of Arms, in his visitation of Derbyshire; and on 22 July 1613 William Camden, Clarenceux King of Arms nominated him his deputy for the visitation of Huntingdonshire. Charles had barely completed this task when he died on 19 November 1613. He was a friend of Camden and Sir Robert Cotton. Thomas Milles commended Charles in his Catalogue of Honour; and Edmund Howes, the continuator of John Stow's Chronicle, acknowledged his assistance.

== Works ==
Camden is said to have purchased Charles's manuscript collection after his death for £90: items from it are now held in the College of Arms and the British Library. They include a collection of epitaphs in the churches of London and elsewhere, with drawings of monuments and arms (British Library, Lansdowne MS 874); and a catalogue of the officers of the College of Arms (Harley MS 5880). Richard Gough states that John Le Neve possessed a manuscript visitation of Staffordshire by Charles, and Sir John Cullum a visitation of Suffolk; but these documents appear to be lost. Charles's Huntingdonshire visitation is extant in three copies, and one, marked "C. 3 Huntingdon 1613" at the College of Arms, was edited for the Camden Society in 1849 by Sir Henry Ellis.

== Family ==
Nicholas married Penelope, daughter of Sir William Segar, Garter King of Arms, who survived him. She subsequently married Timothy Cartwright of Great Washbourne, Gloucestershire. By her second husband she was mother of the architect Thomas Cartwright.

== Arms ==
Coat of arms of Nicholas Charles
Escutcheon Ermine, on a chief gules 5 lozenges in fess or
