= John Philipot =

Officer of arms

John Philipot (1588 – 22 November 1645) was an officer of arms at the College of Arms in London and a politician who sat in the House of Commons from 1628 to 1629. Though he successfully attained the position on Somerset Herald of Arms in Ordinary, he is best known for his production of a roll of arms of the Lord Wardens of the Cinque Ports.

== Life ==
Philipot was born at Folkestone in 1588 and was the second son of Henry Philpot, the mayor of that village. In 1604, John was made an apprentice to a draper in the City of London. This apprenticeship did not last for in 1613, he was appointed Blanche Lyon Pursuivant of Arms Extraordinary and five years later was promoted to Rouge Dragon Pursuivant of Arms in Ordinary. In 1624, he was made Somerset Herald of Arms in Ordinary after purchasing the office from his predecessor. As an officer of arms, Philipot took part in the funeral of James I and the coronation of Charles I. In 1628 he was elected MP for Sandwich and sat until 1629 when King Charles decided to rule without parliament for eleven years.

Arms: Quarterly, (1 & 4) gules, a cross between 4 swords erect argent hilted or; (2 & 3) sable, a bend ermine; in pretence, for Glover, azure, a chevron ermine between 3 crescents argent. Crest: Out of a crown an arm in armour brandishing a blood-spattered sword, all proper.

Philipot also acted as deputy to Garter Principal King of Arms Sir William Segar in 1633. From 1637, Philipot was registrar of the college. In the Civil War, he went to Oxford with the King and was created DCL at the University of Oxford on 18 July 1643. He was captured near Oxford by Parliamentarians in 1645 and taken prisoner for a short time. He died on 22 November 1645 and was buried at the church of St Benet Paul's Wharf.
