= Army Legal Services Branch =

Legal arm of the British Army

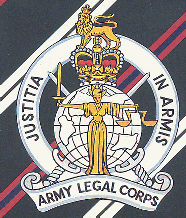
- Cap Badge of the former Army Legal Corps
- Active: 1978, 1992 within AGC
- Country: United Kingdom
- Branch: British Army
- Size: Approx. 120 Commissioned Officers
- Part of: Adjutant General's Corps
- Garrison/HQ: Marlborough Lines, Andover
- Motto: Justitia in Armis
- March: Scales of Justice

Commanders
- Director: Richard Allen

Insignia
- Tactical Recognition Flash

The Army Legal Services Branch (ALS) is a branch of the Adjutant-General's Corps (AGC) in the British Army. Before 1992, the branch existed as the independent Army Legal Corps (ALC).

== History ==
Many of the functions of the ALS were once carried out by the Judge Advocate General (JAG) whose own origins can be traced back to medieval times. Following World War I, the growing demand for legal services within the army led in 1923 to the creation of the Military Department of the Office of the Judge Advocate General.

The Directorate of Army Legal Services was formed from the JAG's office on 1 October 1948 and would go on to receive full corps status as the Army Legal Corps on 1 November 1978. It was always the smallest corps in the Army. On 6 April 1992, the corps became the Army Legal Services Branch of the Adjutant General's Corps, but retains a separate identity and its own cap badge.

== Activities ==
Army Legal Services Branch is a group of qualified solicitors, barristers and Scottish advocates providing legal support to the Army.

== List of directors general ==
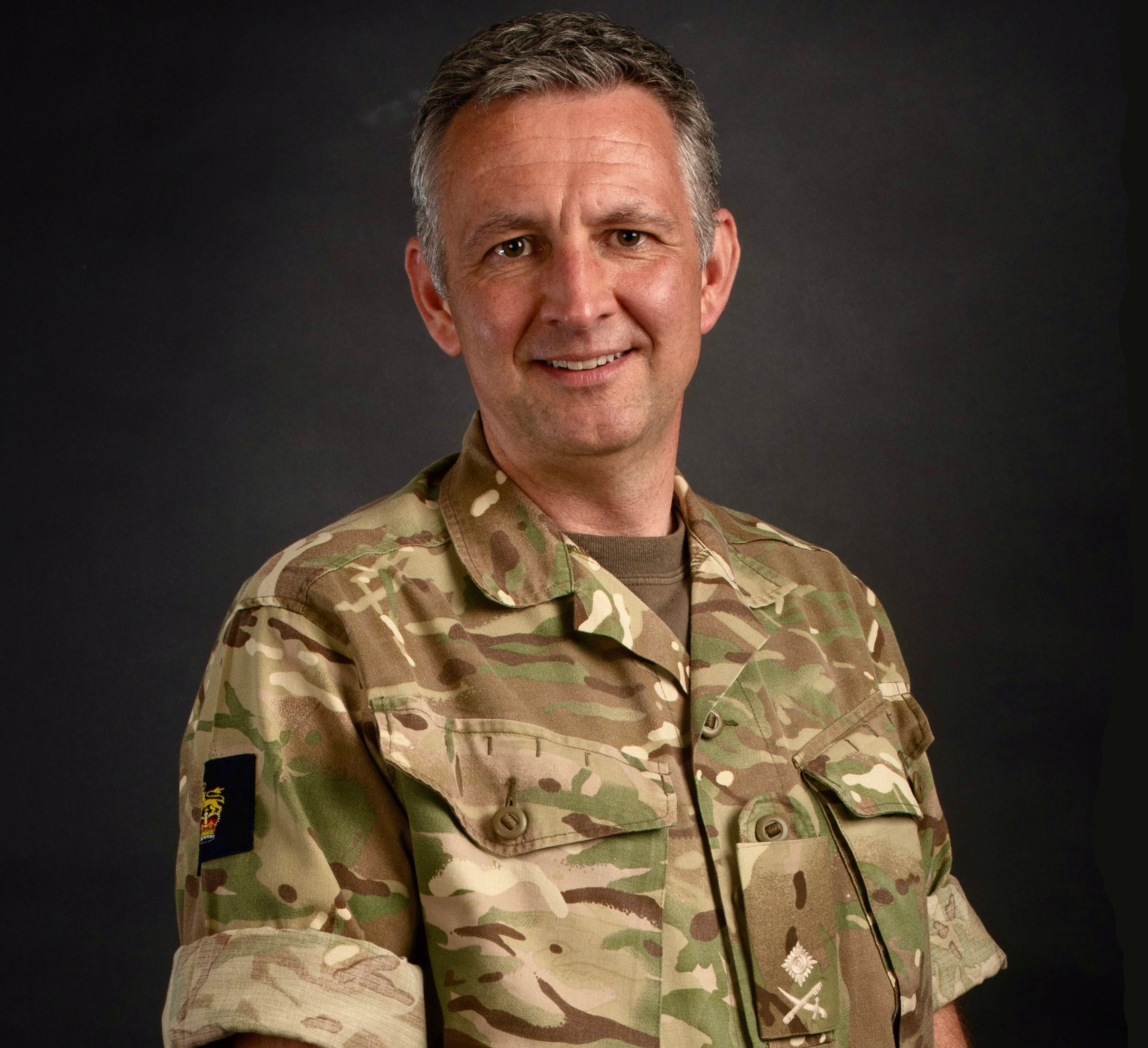
Major General Alex Taylor, former Director Army Legal Services Branch

The head of the Army Legal Services Branch is its director. The director general holds the rank of major general.

Directors General
| Date of appointment | Name |
|---|---|
| | Major-General G. A. Whiteley CBE |
| 13 July 1969 | Major-General H. Owen |
| 19 July 1971 | Major-General R. S. Marshall TD |
| 30 July 1973 | Major-General J. C. Robertson |
| 2 Jul 1976 | Major-General D. S. Appleby |
| 6 Nov 1978 | Major-General J. A. McIlvenna CB |
| 12 Nov 1980 | Major-General Sir David Hughes-Morgan Bt. CB, CBE |
| 24 Feb 1984 | Major-General J. F. Bowman |
| 3 Dec 1986 | Major-General T. Fugard |
| 8 Jan 1990 | Major-General D. H. D. Selwood |
| 4 May 1992 | Major-General Mike H. F. Clarke |
| 20 Apr 1994 | Major-General A. P. V. Rogers |
| 1 Apr 1997 | Major-General Gordon Risius CB |
| 20 Jan 2003 | Major-General David Howell CB, OBE |
| 1 Oct 2010 | Major-General Michael Conway CB |
| 30 Sept 2015 | Major-General Susan Ridge |
| 5 July 2019 | Major-General Alexander Taylor |
| 1 January 2024 | Major-General Richard A. Allen |

== See also ==
- RAF Legal Branch
- Judge Advocate General (United Kingdom)
