= Iain Henderson (Royal Navy officer) =

Royal Navy Rear Admiral (born April 1948)

Rear Admiral Iain Henderson CB CBE DL
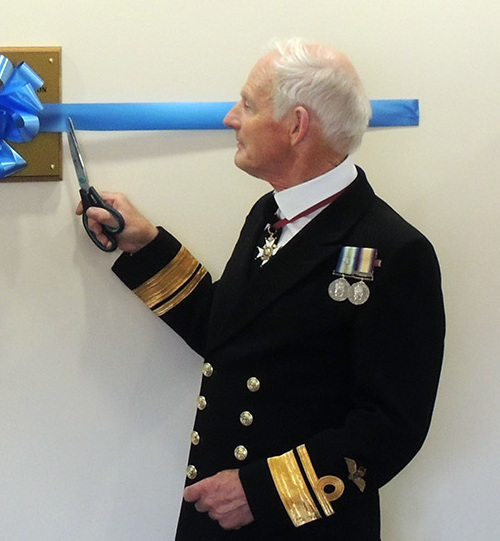
- Henderson in 2018
- Born: 1 April 1948 (age 78)
- Military career
- Allegiance: United Kingdom
- Branch: Royal Navy
- Rank: Rear Admiral
- Commands: Naval Air Command; HMNB Portsmouth; RNAS Yeovilton; HMS London; HMS Charybdis; HMS Ariadne
- Conflicts: Falklands War; Gulf War
- Awards: Companion of the Order of the Bath; Commander of the Order of the British Empire

Rear Admiral Iain Robert Henderson, CB, CBE, DL (born 1 April 1948) is a retired senior Royal Navy officer.

== Early life and education ==
Henderson was born on 1 April 1948. He was educated at Epsom College, then an all-boys private school. He entered the Britannia Royal Naval College in 1965.

== Naval career ==
Henderson joined the Royal Navy and trained as a helicopter and fast jet pilot, including a secondment to the RAF where he flew McDonnell Douglas Phantom interceptors out of RAF Leuchars. He became second-in-command of the frigate HMS Plymouth and saw action during the Falklands War. He went on to be commanding officer of the frigate HMS Ariadne, the frigate HMS Charybdis and the frigate HMS London. In HMS London he saw action during the Gulf War. He went on to command RNAS Yeovilton and HMNB Portsmouth.

Henderson became Flag Officer, Naval Air Command in 1998 before retiring in 2001.

== Later life ==
After his retirement from the navy, Henderson joined the third sector. From 2001 to 2007, he was Chief Executive of Sue Ryder Care, a British social care charity. From 2002 to 2006, he was Gentleman Usher of the Scarlet Rod. His final duty as Gentleman Usher of the Scarlet Rod occurred in May 2006, during that year's Installation of Knights. In June 2006, he was appointed Registrar and Secretary of the Order of the Bath.

In 2006, Henderson was appointed Deputy Lieutenant of Hampshire. He was Vice Lord-Lieutenant of Hampshire from 2018 to 2023, when he reached the mandatory retirement age of 75.

Government offices
Preceded by Air Vice Marshal Richard Peirse	Gentleman Usher of the Scarlet Rod; 2002–2006	Succeeded by Major General Charles Vyvyan
