= Retrospective Review =

The Retrospective Review was an English periodical published from 1820 to 1828. It was founded by Henry Southern, who edited it to 1826, as well as contributing. From 1827 to 1828 Nicholas Harris Nicolas was co-editor with Southern.

It concentrated on Early Modern English literature; John Gross saw it as presaging later academic literary criticism. Contributors included:

- George Frederick Beltz
- James Crossley
- Charles Wentworth Dilke;
- William Ford
- Basil Montagu
- William Johnson Fox;
- John Hamilton Reynolds;
- William Stevenson
- Thomas Noon Talfourd.

The title was revived in the 1850s by the publisher John Russell Smith.
