= Wyndham Murray =

British politician

Sir Wyndham Murray
- Born: 22 February 1844
- Died: 1 November 1928 (aged 84)
- Education: Highgate School; Marlborough College
- Occupations: Soldier and politician
- Title: Member of Parliament for Bath
- Term: 1896–1902
- Political party: Conservative
- Spouse: Emma Konarski nee Walker (1890–1922)
- Parent(s): Rev Thomas Boyles Murray and Helen Douglas
- Military career
- Allegiance: UK
- Branch: British Army
- Service years: 1862–1890
- Rank: Colonel
- Conflicts: Anglo-Zulu War; Second Anglo-Afghan War; Battle of Tel el-Kebir

Colonel Sir Charles Wyndham Murray, KCB (22 February 1844 – 1 November 1928) was a British Army officer and politician. He served as a Conservative Member of Parliament MP for Bath from 1892 to 1906 and as Gentleman Usher of the Scarlet Rod of the Order of the Bath from 1913 until his death.

== Biography ==
=== Early life and education ===
Charles Wyndham Murray was born on 22 February 1844, the son of Rev Thomas Boyles Murray and Helen Douglas, and was educated at Highgate School from 1853 until 1856, when he went to Marlborough College.

The Rev Mr Murray served as Prebendary of St Paul's Cathedral and is remembered there by a pair of candle holders at the main entrance which were given by Thomas Douglas Murray 1841–1911 barrister, Egyptologist, author in memory of his father.

=== Career ===
He began his military career as an Ensign in the 61st South Gloucestershire Regiment in November 1862, promoted to Lieutenant in October 1865 and passed from Staff College in 1872. By October 1877 he was a Captain and in July 1881, a Major. During World War I, he served as military King's Messenger in France.

In 1875, he was appointed Deputy-Assistant Quartermaster-General in Cork, and then moved to the Intelligence Department in Dublin. In 1878, he moved to Turkey, where he was a military attaché. During the Anglo-Zulu War, he was aide-de-camp to Major General Crealocke (1st Division), then deployed with Clarke's column on reconnaissance missions (medal and clasp). In Spring 1880, he was attached to 72nd Highlanders at Kabul (staff), became orderly officer to General Thomas Durand Baker, taking part in the Logar Valley expedition of May–June 1880.

In 1882, he was involved in the Egyptian War, as Deputy Assistant Adjutant and Quartermaster-General on the base and lines of communication; he was present at Tel-el-Kebir, gaining the Khedive's Star and 4th Class Osminieh. During 1884–85, he took part in the Bechuanaland operations. He retired from the service in 1890.

He was elected Conservative MP for Bath 1892–1906 and was a member of Carlton and Army and Navy Clubs. His appointments included Chairman of the Japan Society from 1913 to 1918, and he held the Order of the Rising Sun.

He was appointed a Companion of the Order of the Bath (CB) in the November 1902 Birthday Honours list, was promoted to a Knight Commander of the Order in 1917, and served as a Gentleman Usher of the Scarlet Rod to the Order of the Bath (1913).

=== Marriage and children ===
He married Emma Cecilia Walker in 1890. Lady Murray, as she was known, died in 1922. Their country seat was 'Culverlands' at Burghfield in Berkshire.

=== Death and afterward ===
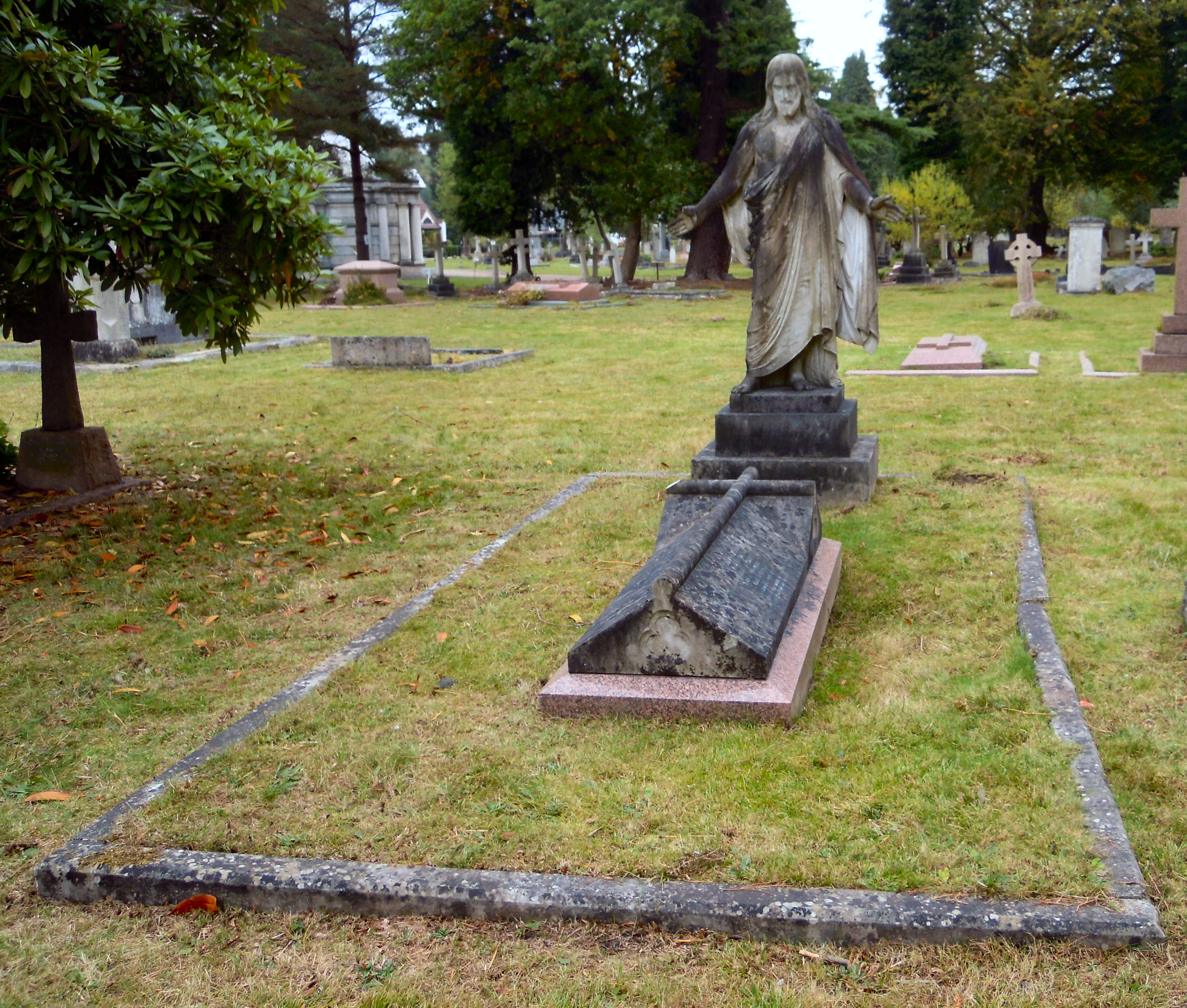
Murray's grave in Brookwood Cemetery

Culverlands, the former residence of Col. Sir Charles Wyndham Murray, C.B., is an 18th-century house altered and enlarged in 1879. It is a plain plastered building with a balustraded parapet and slate roofs, situated in an elevated well-wooded park, the cedars being particularly fine. The araucarias were raised from seed brought from South America by the late Thomas Bland Garland and are probably the oldest in England grown by this method.

On his death Murray was buried in Brookwood Cemetery.

== Awards and honours ==
- 1891: Honourable Corps of Gentlemen at Arms
- 1902: Companion of the Order of the Bath
- 1905: Knight Bachelor
- 1917: Knight Commander of the Order of the Bath
- 1927: Bailiff Grand Cross of the Order of St John
- Khedive's Star
- Order of Osminieh 4th class
- Order of the Rising Sun

His medals were sold at auction in February 2016 for £7,200 as was his badge of office as Scarlet Rod for £900.

Parliament of the United Kingdom
Preceded by Edmond Wodehouse; Robert Laurie	Member of Parliament for Bath; 1892–1906; With: Edmond Wodehouse	Succeeded by Donald Maclean; George Peabody Gooch
Honorary titles
Preceded by	Gentleman Usher of the Scarlet Rod; 1913–1928	Succeeded by Richard Stapleton-Cotton
