= Denis Crowley-Milling =

Royal Air Force Air Marshal (1919-1996)

Air Marshal Sir Denis Crowley-Milling KCB CBE DSO DFC* AE
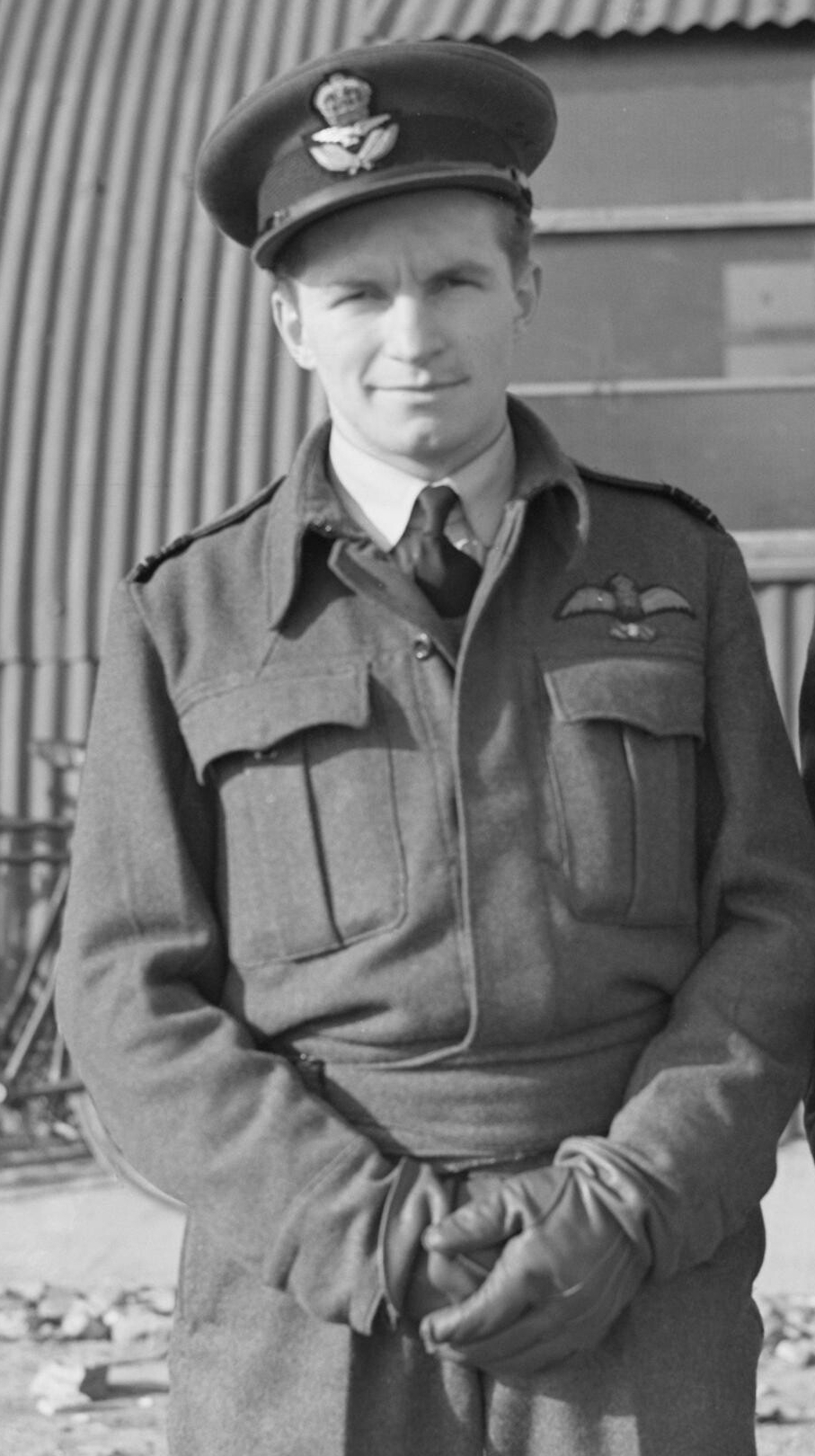
- Born: 22 March 1919; St Asaph, Wales
- Died: 1 December 1996 (aged 77); Westminster, England
- Military career
- Allegiance: United Kingdom
- Branch: Royal Air Force
- Service years: 1937–1975
- Rank: Air Marshal
- Nickname: Crow
- Commands: No. 46 Group (1973); No. 38 Group (1970–72); RAF Hong Kong (1964–66); RAF Leconfield (1962–64); No. 6 Squadron (1947–50); No. 121 Wing (1943); No. 181 Squadron (1942–43)
- Conflicts: World War II
- Awards: Knight Commander of the Order of the Bath; Commander of the Order of the British Empire; Distinguished Service Order; Distinguished Flying Cross & Bar; Air Efficiency Award
- Other work: Gentleman Usher of the Scarlet Rod

Air Marshal Sir Denis Crowley-Milling, KCB, CBE, DSO, DFC*, AE (22 March 1919 – 1 December 1996) was a Second World War fighter pilot and later an air officer in the Royal Air Force.

== Second World War ==
Originally a Rolls-Royce apprentice, he joined the Royal Air Force Volunteer Reserve, was mobilised in 1937 as a trainee pilot and was posted to No. 615 Squadron as a sergeant pilot. Originally flying the Gloster Gladiator biplane, the squadron converted to the new Hawker Hurricane monoplane fighter. In April 1940 after operational training, he was commissioned in the Royal Air Force Volunteer Reserve as a pilot officer and posted back to No. 615 Squadron.

Using his experience at Rolls-Royce when a number of squadron aircraft became separated from their groundcrew in France, he showed the other pilots how to service the aircraft and they departed just before the advancing German tanks arrived.

In June 1940 he was posted to No. 242 Squadron and flew during the Battle of Britain, one of The Few. The squadron moved to RAF Coltishall and Crowley-Milling flew as No. 2 to the new commanding officer Douglas Bader. For his service with the squadron, Crowley-Milling was awarded the Distinguished Flying Cross (DFC) on 11 April 1941. The citation read:

This officer has participated in numerous engagements against the enemy over a long period and has shown a fine spirit throughout. On one occasion he pursued a Junkers 88 out to sea and, although his aircraft was severely damaged by a cannon shell early in the pursuit, he continued his attack until the enemy aircraft was on fire and disappeared into cloud 40 miles out at sea. He has displayed great courage and initiative, and has destroyed at least four enemy aircraft.

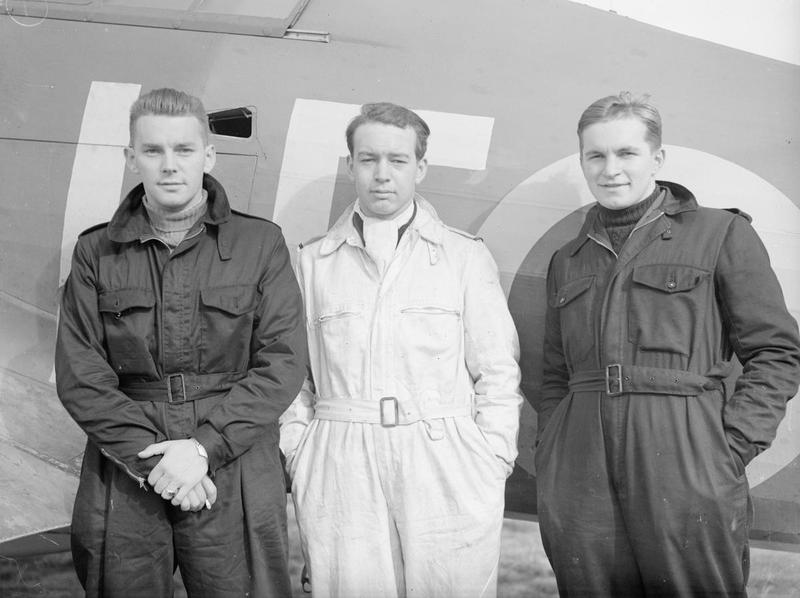
Crowley-Milling stands on the right of this group of No. 242 Squadron pilots, September 1940

On 13 June 1941 he became a flight commander on No. 610 Squadron. On 21 August 1941 he was shot down over France while escorting Stirling bombers on a raid to Lille, but with the help of the French Resistance he evaded capture. He became ill with paratyphoid in Spain and was repatriated back to Britain where he re-joined his squadron. Crowley-Milling was subsequently awarded a Bar to his DFC on 29 September 1942:

Since being awarded the Distinguished Flying Cross in March, 1941, this officer has completed many more sorties over enemy occupied territory and has destroyed at least one hostile aircraft. This officer, whose courage and skill have set a splendid example, has always displayed outstanding keenness to inflict losses on the enemy.

He was promoted to acting squadron leader in September 1942 and given command of No. 181 Squadron, who were operating the Hawker Typhoon in the fighter-bomber role from RAF Duxford. With another promotion to acting wing commander he took command of No. 121 Wing from June 1943 for four months, and was awarded the Distinguished Service Order. In October 1943 he developed problems with his eyesight which saw him removed from operational flying and he filled a number of staff appointments until the end of the war.

During his operational flying Crowley-Milling had four confirmed kills and two shared as destroyed.

== Post war ==
With his eye problem improving Crowley-Milling was appointed a permanent commission from 1 September 1945. With promotion to squadron leader in 1947 he was appointed officer commanding No. 6 Squadron in Palestine with the Hawker Tempest. He gained more promotions and a number of staff positions, including command of RAF Leconfield from 1962 to 1964, RAF Hong Kong from 1964 to 1966, No. 38 Group RAF from 1970 to 1972 and No. 46 Group RAF from 1973 to 1974. He was appointed a [Commander of the Order of the British Empire in the 1963 New Year Honours, and knighted as a Knight Commander of the Order of the Bath in the 1973 Birthday Honours.

== Retirement ==
Crowley-Milling retired at his own request in 1975 and became Controller of the RAF Benevolent Fund for the next six years and Founder Chairman (later Vice Patron) of the International Air Tattoo. From 1979 to 1985 he was a Gentleman Usher of the Scarlet Rod, then Registrar and Secretary of the Order of the Bath until 1990. In 1992, he was appointed Master of the Guild of Air Pilots and Air Navigators. He was actively involved with many charities, including the Not Forgotten Association and his old friend's Douglas Bader Foundation when Bader died. He died on 1 December 1996 in London.

== See also ==
- List of RAF aircrew in the Battle of Britain
- List of World War II aces from the United Kingdom
- Reach for the Sky, a 1956 film. Crowley-Milling's character was played by Basil Appleby.

Military offices
Preceded by Harold Martin	Air Officer Commanding No. 38 Group; 1970–1972	Succeeded by Frederick Hazlewood
