= Alex Taylor (British Army officer) =

British Army officer and lawyer

Major General Alex Taylor CB
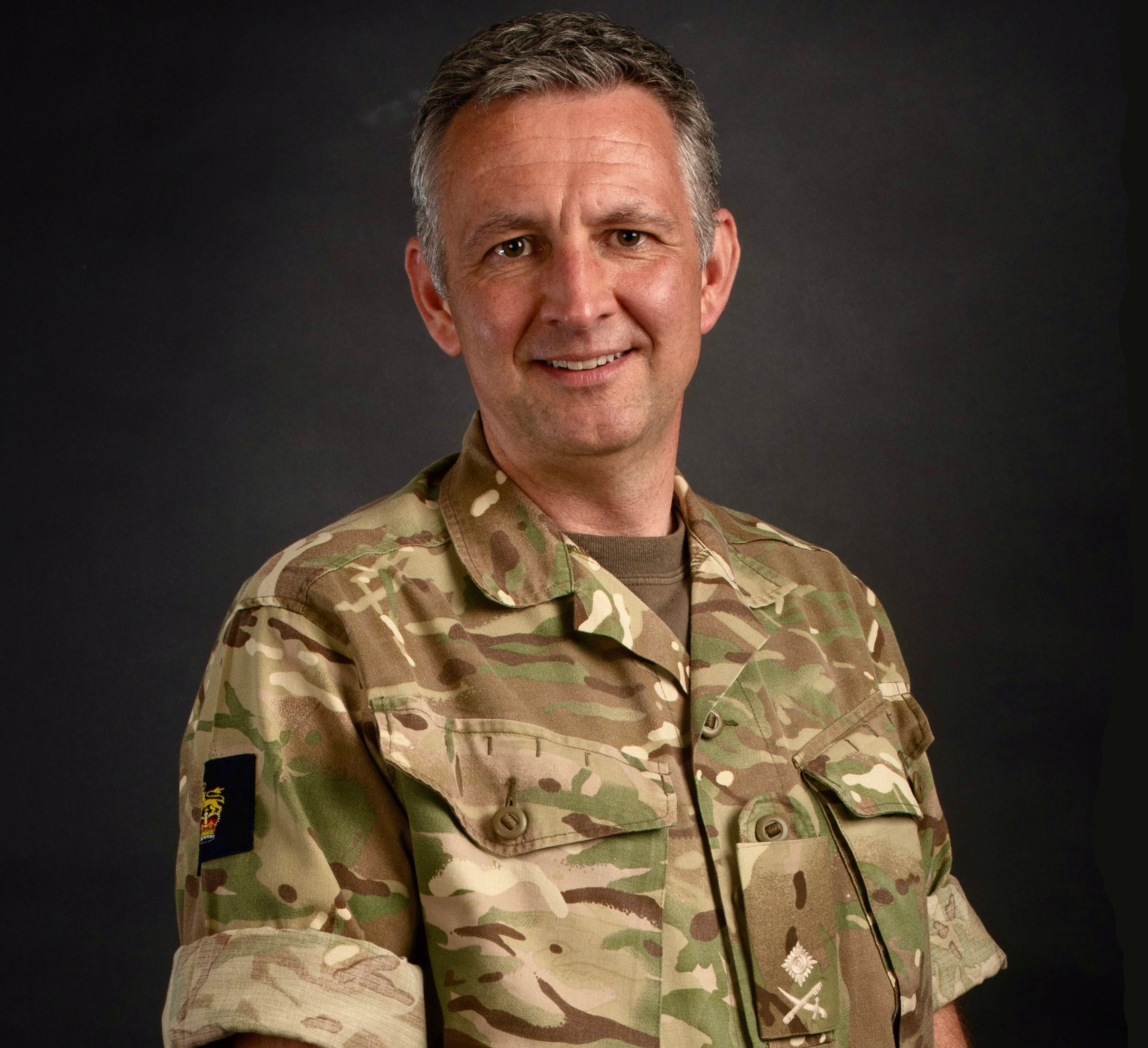
- Spouse: Amanda Nash
- Children: 2
- Military career
- Allegiance: United Kingdom
- Branch: British Army
- Service years: 1997 –
- Rank: Major General

Major General Alexander Taylor CB, (born 30 August 1970) is a senior British Army officer. He served as Director, Army Legal Services Branch until 1 January 2024.

Taylor was educated at Hurstpierpoint College and Durham University (BSc), followed by Cambridge University (LLM). Before joining the military he was a solicitor with City of London firm Wilde Sapte.
