= Richard Stapleton-Cotton =

Royal Navy Admiral (1873–1953)

Admiral Richard Stapleton-Cotton CB CBE MVO
- Born: Richard Greville Arthur Wellington Stapleton-Cotton; 7 November 1873; Wellington Barracks, London
- Died: 5 January 1953 (aged 79); Merionethshire
- Military career
- Allegiance: United Kingdom
- Branch: Royal Navy
- Service years: 1887–1931
- Rank: Admiral
- Conflicts: First World War
- Awards: Member of the Royal Victorian Order; Commander of the Order of the British Empire; Companion of the Bath
- Other work: Gentleman Usher of the Scarlet Rod

Admiral Richard Greville Arthur Wellington Stapleton-Cotton CB CBE MVO (7 November 1873 – 5 January 1953) was a British officer of the Royal Navy.

== Early life and family ==
Richard Greville Arthur Wellington Stapleton-Cotton was born at Wellington Barracks, London, on 7 November 1873, the second son of Colonel the Honourable Richard Southwell George Stapleton-Cotton (1849–1925), of Plas Llwynon, Anglesey, and his wife, the Honourable Jane Charlotte Methuen, daughter of Frederick Henry Paul Methuen, second Baron Methuen. His father was the younger son of the second Viscount Combermere and had been the Inspector-General of Police in Guiana from 1889 to 1891, was an officer in the Wiltshire Regiment, having served in the Anglo-Zulu War of 1879 and in Bechuanaland in 1885, and served as a Justice of the Peace for Shropshire and Cheshire.

In 1910, he married Olive Harriet Cotton-Jodrell, a daughter of Sir Edward Thomas Davenant Cotton-Jodrell, of Reaseheath and Yeardsley, Cheshire, Member of Parliament for Wirral, and his wife Mary Rennell Coleridge.

Stapleton-Cotton and his dog Tinker are the only two males ever to be accepted as fully paid-up members of the Women's Institute: he played a major part in setting up the first WI meeting in the UK, held in Anglesey in 1915.

=== Ancestry ===
Ancestors of Richard Stapleton-Cotton

8. Field Marshal Rt. Hon. Stapleton Stapleton-Cotton, first Viscount Combermere
4. Col. Rt. Hon. Wellington Henry Stapleton-Cotton, Viscount Combermere
9. Caroline Greville
2. Col. Hon. Richard Southwell George Stapleton-Cotton
10. Sir George Sitwell, second Baronet
5. Susan Alice Sitwell
11. Susan Tait, daughter of Crauford Tait
1. Admiral Richard Greville Arthur Wellington Stapleton-Cotton
12. Rt. Hon. Paul Methuen, first Baron Methuen
6. Rt. Hon. Frederick Henry Methuen, second Baron Methuen
13. Jane Dorothea St John-Mildmay
3. Hon. Jane Charlotte Methuen
14. Rev. John Sanford, of Nynehead
7. Anna Horatia Caroline Sanford
15. Eliza Georgiana Morgan

== Naval career ==
Stapleton-Cotton entered the Royal Navy as a cadet in 1887. He was promoted to midshipman two years later and then became a Sub-Lieutenant in 1893, lieutenant two years later, commander in 1905 and captain in 1913. He was the Commander at the Royal Naval College at Osborne from 1906 to 1910. Promoted to rear-admiral in 1923 and then to vice-admiral in 1928, he was placed on the retired list by 1931. In 1932, he was promoted to the rank of admiral in the retired list.

In 1905, he was appointed a Member of the Royal Victorian Order (MVO). He was also appointed a Commander of the Order of the British Empire (CBE) and a Companion of the Order of the Bath (CB). From 1928 to 1932, Stapleton-Cotton served as Gentleman Usher of the Scarlet Rod, and then as Registrar and Secretary of the Order of the Bath from 1932 to 1948; in the latter capacity, he attended the Coronation of King George VI and Queen Elizabeth in 1937 and took part in the procession into the Abbey.

== Later life ==
Admiral Stapleton-Cotton died on 5 January 1953, aged 79, in Merionethshire. He left an estate worth over £24,000.

Honorary titles
Preceded by Wyndham Murray	Gentleman Usher of the Scarlet Rod; 1928–1932	Succeeded by Charles Longcroft
