= John Thompson (RAF officer) =

British Royal Air Force officer (1947–2023)

- Born: 18 September 1947
- Died: 15 March 2023 (aged 75)
- Military career
- Allegiance: United Kingdom
- Branch: Royal Air Force
- Service years: 1970–2002
- Rank: Air Marshal
- Commands: Royal Air Force College Cranwell; RAF Wittering
- Conflicts: Bosnian War
- Awards: Companion of the Order of the Bath

Air Marshal John Hugh Thompson, CB (18 September 1947 – 15 March 2023) was a British Royal Air Force officer who became Head of the British Defence Staff in Washington, D.C. from 2000 until his retirement in 2002.

== RAF career ==
Educated at Fielding High School in New Zealand, Thompson joined the Royal Air Force in 1970. He became Station Commander at RAF Wittering in 1988, Senior Air Staff Officer at RAF Rheindahlen in 1993 and an assistant to the High Representative for Bosnia and Herzegovina in 1996. He went on to be Commandant of the Royal Air Force College Cranwell in 1997 and Head of the British Defence Staff and Defence Attaché in Washington, D.C. in 2000 before retiring in 2002.

Thompson died on 15 March 2023, at the age of 75.

Military offices
Preceded by Charles Vyvyan	Head of the British Defence Staff in Washington, D.C. 2000–2002	Succeeded by Anthony Dymock
