= Gentleman Usher of the Scarlet Rod =

UK chivalric office

The usher of the Scarlet Rod, formally known as the Gentleman Usher of the Scarlet Rod or Lady Usher of the Scarlet Rod is the Usher to the Most Honourable Order of the Bath, established 14 January 1726.

The Brunswick Herald, an officer of arms of the Order of the Bath, was annexed with the position at the time it was established. The office lapsed in 1857 when the Order of the Bath was remodelled. The Brunswick Herald was not part of the College of Arms, although the final four officer holders were officers in ordinary of the college. The heraldic badge of the order is enamelled with the arms of the Braunschweig (Brunswick) family, Gules, two lions passant guardant or.

The present holder, Major General Susan Ridge, is the first Lady Usher of the Scarlet Rod.

== Office holders from 1726 ==
- 14 January 1726 – ?: Edmund Sawyer
- bef. 1763 – aft. 1789: Henry Hill
- bef. 1806 – 2 July 1814: Sir Isaac Heard
- 2 July 1814 – 1841: George Frederick Beltz
- 2 December 1841 – 1857?: Albert Woods
- 1857? – 18 May 1863: Frederick Arthur Henry Chichester
- 1863–1911?: Charles George Barrington
- vacant?
- 7 March 1913 – 30 March 1928: Colonel Sir Charles Wyndham Murray
- 30 March 1928 – 15 November 1932: Admiral Richard Stapleton-Cotton
- 15 November 1932 – 14 May 1948: Air Vice Marshal Sir Charles Longcroft
- 14 May 1948 – 12 March 1954: Major General Douglas Wimberley
- 12 March 1954 – 17 July 1964: Rear Admiral Robert Sherbrooke
- 25 September 1964 – 3 August 1979: Air Marshal Sir Anthony Selway
- 9 February 1968 – 3 August 1979: Rear Admiral Colin Duncan Madden
- 3 August 1979 – 1985: Air Marshal Sir Denis Crowley-Milling
- 19 August 1985 – 18 July 1990: Rear Admiral David Edward Macey
- 18 July 1990 – 13 September 2001: Air Vice Marshal Sir Richard Peirse
- 15 March 2002 – 13 June 2006: Rear Admiral Iain Henderson (appointment dated from 13 September 2001)
- 13 June 2006 – 15 July 2018: Major General Charles Vyvyan
- 16 July 2018 – 19 June 2023: Major General James Gordon
- 19 June 2023 – present: Major General Susan Ridge
