= David Howell (British Army officer) =

British Army general

Major General David Howell CB OBE
- Military career
- Allegiance: United Kingdom
- Branch: British Army
- Rank: Major General
- Commands: Director General, Army Legal Services
- Conflicts: The Troubles; Gulf War
- Awards: Companion of the Order of the Bath; Officer of the Order of the British Empire

Major General David Malcolm Howell, CB, OBE is a barrister and retired British Army officer who was, until January 2011, Director General, Army Legal Services.

== Military career ==
He was appointed a Member of the Order of the British Empire (MBE) in the 1980 Birthday Honours, and promoted to Officer of the Order (OBE) in 1991, having served in Northern Ireland and Companion of the Order of the Bath in the 2006 Birthday Honours.

He was promoted to captain on 9 June 1975 and transferred from a short-service to a regular commission on 25 February 1977, retaining the rank of captain with seniority from 9 June 1975. He was promoted to major in 1982 and resigned his commission later the same year, but was reinstated on 12 March 1984, with seniority from 22 September 1983. He was promoted to lieutenant colonel in 1988. He served in Iraq during the Gulf War in 1991 and promoted to colonel on 30 June 1998, with seniority from the same date, and to brigadier in 2001.

He was appointed Director General, Army Legal Services in 2003—a position he held until his retirement on 28 January 2011.
