= Romanian frigate Regina Maria (F222) =

Frigate originally built for Royal navy, Now in service with Romanian Naval forces

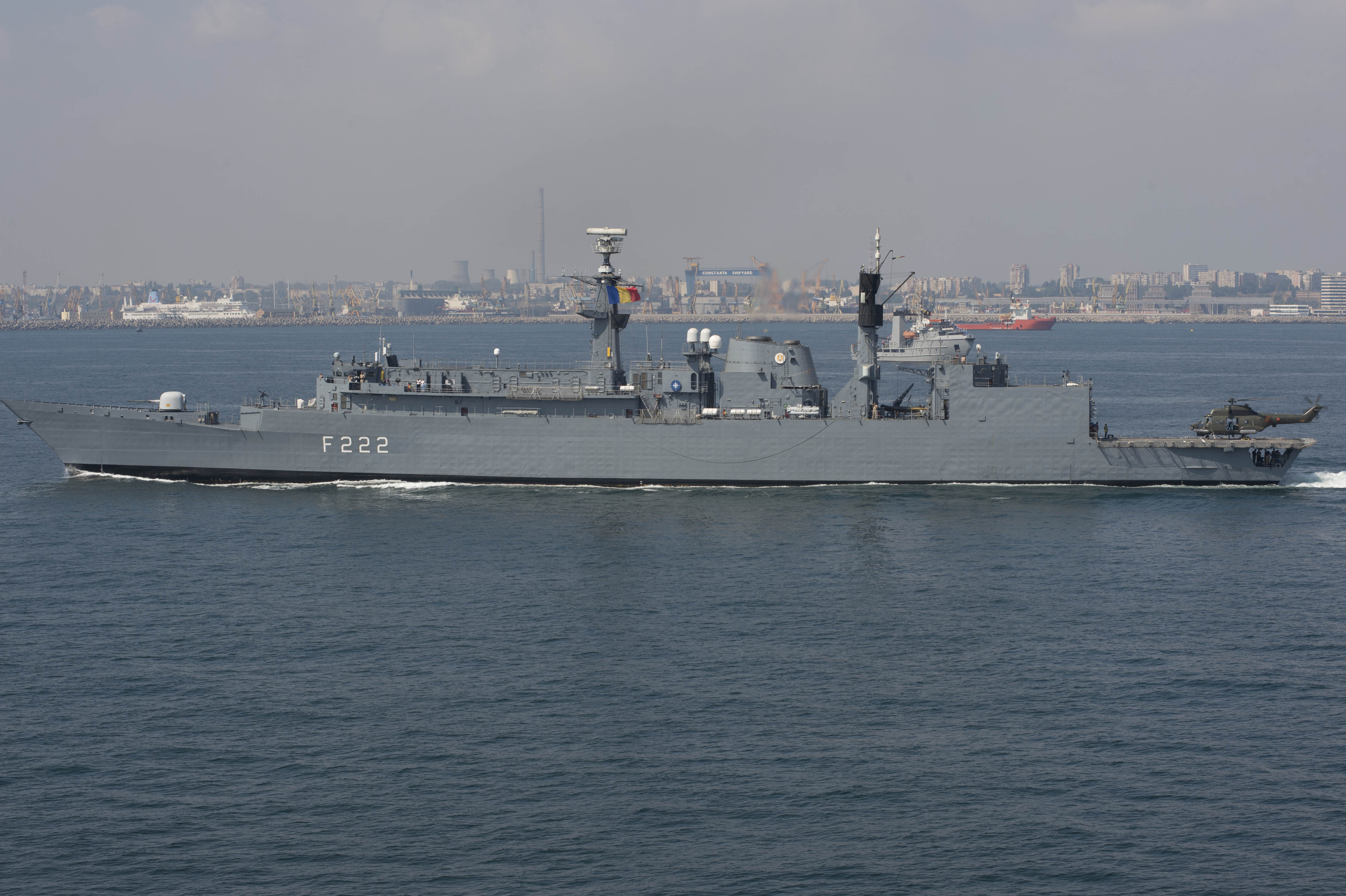
- Regina Maria underway in Constanța, August 2014

History

United Kingdom
- Name: HMS London
- Namesake: London
- Builder: Yarrow Shipbuilders
- Laid down: 7 February 1983
- Launched: 27 October 1984
- Commissioned: 5 June 1987
- Decommissioned: 14 January 1999
- Identification: Pennant number: F95
- Fate: Sold to Romania on 14 January 2003

Romania
- Name: Regina Maria
- Namesake: Marie of Edinburgh
- Acquired: 14 January 2003
- Commissioned: 21 April 2005
- Identification: Pennant number: F222; MMSI number: 264800091; MarineTraffic ID: 6269266; Callsign:YQYN
- Status: In active service
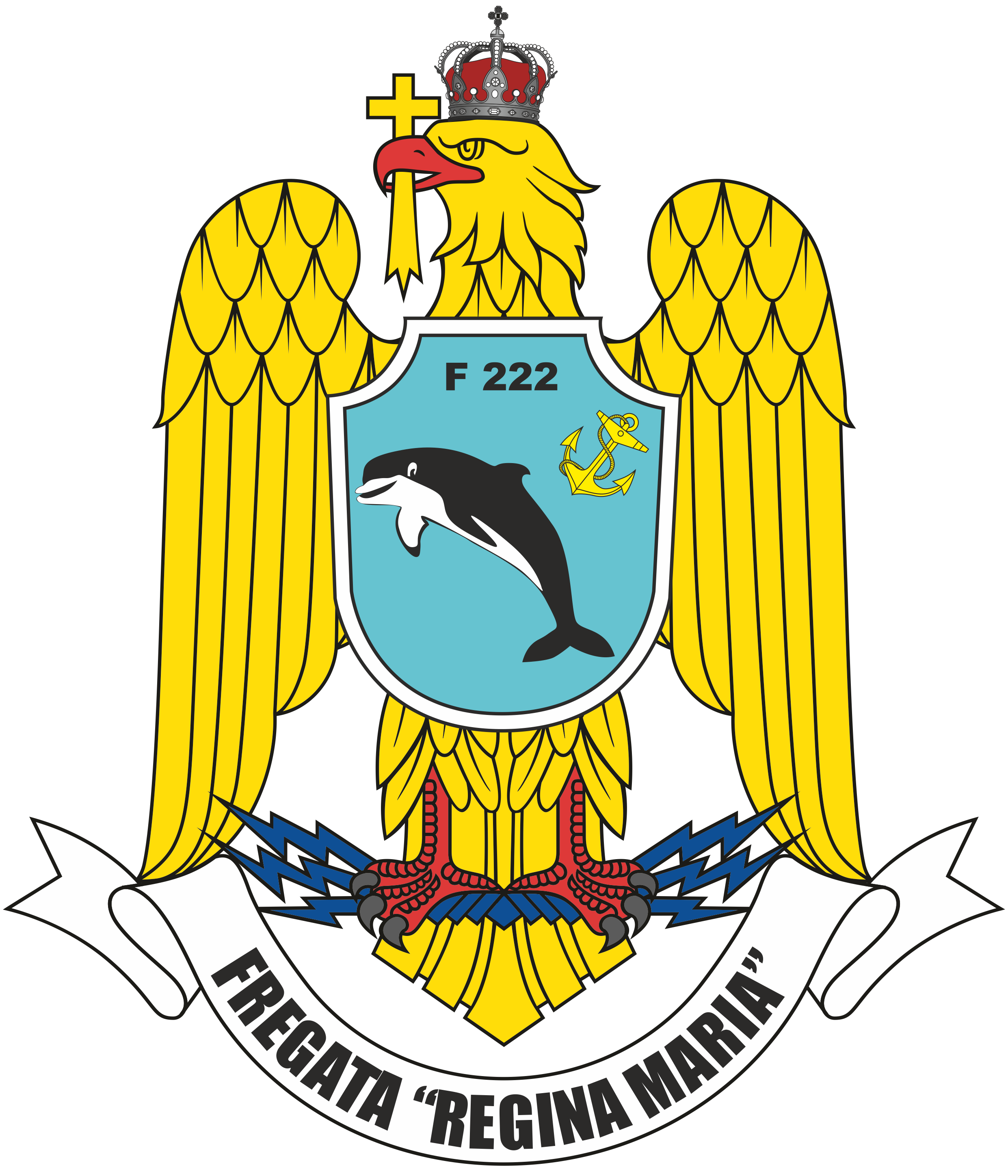
- Badge

General characteristics
- Class & type: Type 22 frigate
- Displacement: 5,300 tonnes
- Length: 148.1 m (486 ft)
- Beam: 14.8 m (49 ft)
- Draught: 6.4 m (21 ft)
- Propulsion: 2 × Rolls-Royce Olympus TM3B high-speed gas turbines (54,000 shp / 40 MW); 2 × Rolls-Royce Tyne RM1C cruise gas turbines (9,700 shp / 7.2 MW)
- Speed: 18 knots (33 km/h; 21 mph) (cruise); 30 knots (56 km/h; 35 mph) (max)
- Complement: 250
- Armament: 2 × 6 GWS25 Sea Wolf surface-to-air missile launchers; 4 × 1 MM.38 Exocet surface-to-surface missile launchers; 2 × Twin 30 mm BMARC anti-aircraft guns; 2 × 20 mm GAM-BO1 guns; 4 × 7.62 mm general purpose machine guns; As Regina Maria: 76/62 Oto Melara Super-Rapid gun
- Aircraft carried: Lynx Mk.8; As Regina Maria: IAR-330 Puma Naval; MQ-35A V-BAT UAV

Regina Maria (F222) is a Type 22 frigate of the Romanian Naval Forces, formerly a Royal Navy ship named HMS London (F95). It is named after Queen Marie of Romania, wife of King Ferdinand I of Romania.

== Service ==
HMS London was a Type 22 frigate of the Royal Navy, originally named Bloodhound but renamed London at the request of the Lord Mayor of London.

She was flagship of the Royal Navy task force during the 1991 Gulf War.

She was decommissioned on 14 January 1999 and sold to the Romanian Navy on 14 January 2003, being commissioned as Regina Maria on 21 April 2005. Before the sale the Sea Wolf and Exocet missile systems were removed, and the only armament the ship had when delivered was two 30 mm BMARC cannons and two three-tube anti-submarine torpedo launchers. The Romanian Navy had a 76 mm OTO-Melara gun system fitted forward where the Exocets had been mounted, but no missile systems or additional weapons have been fitted. There has since been some controversy over the price for which Romania purchased the ship.

Romanian authorities are currently working in collaboration with the Romanian COMOTI institute to replace two of the Rolls-Royce gas turbine engines with two ST40M turbine engines designed at COMOTI.

== Commanding officers ==
Notable commanding officers include Iain Henderson (1990-1991), Mark Stanhope (1991-1992) and Timothy McClement (1992-1994).

== Gallery ==
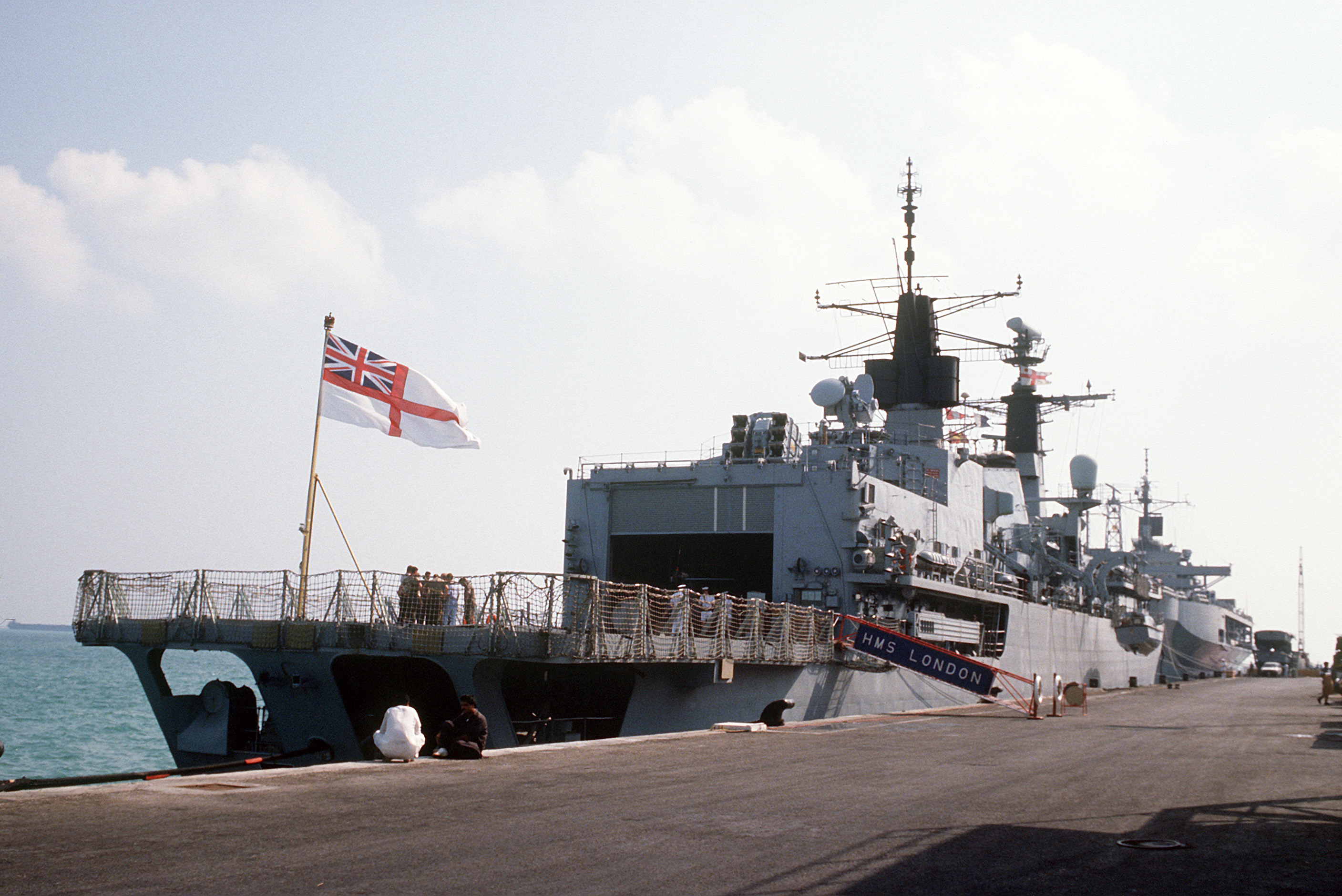
HMS London

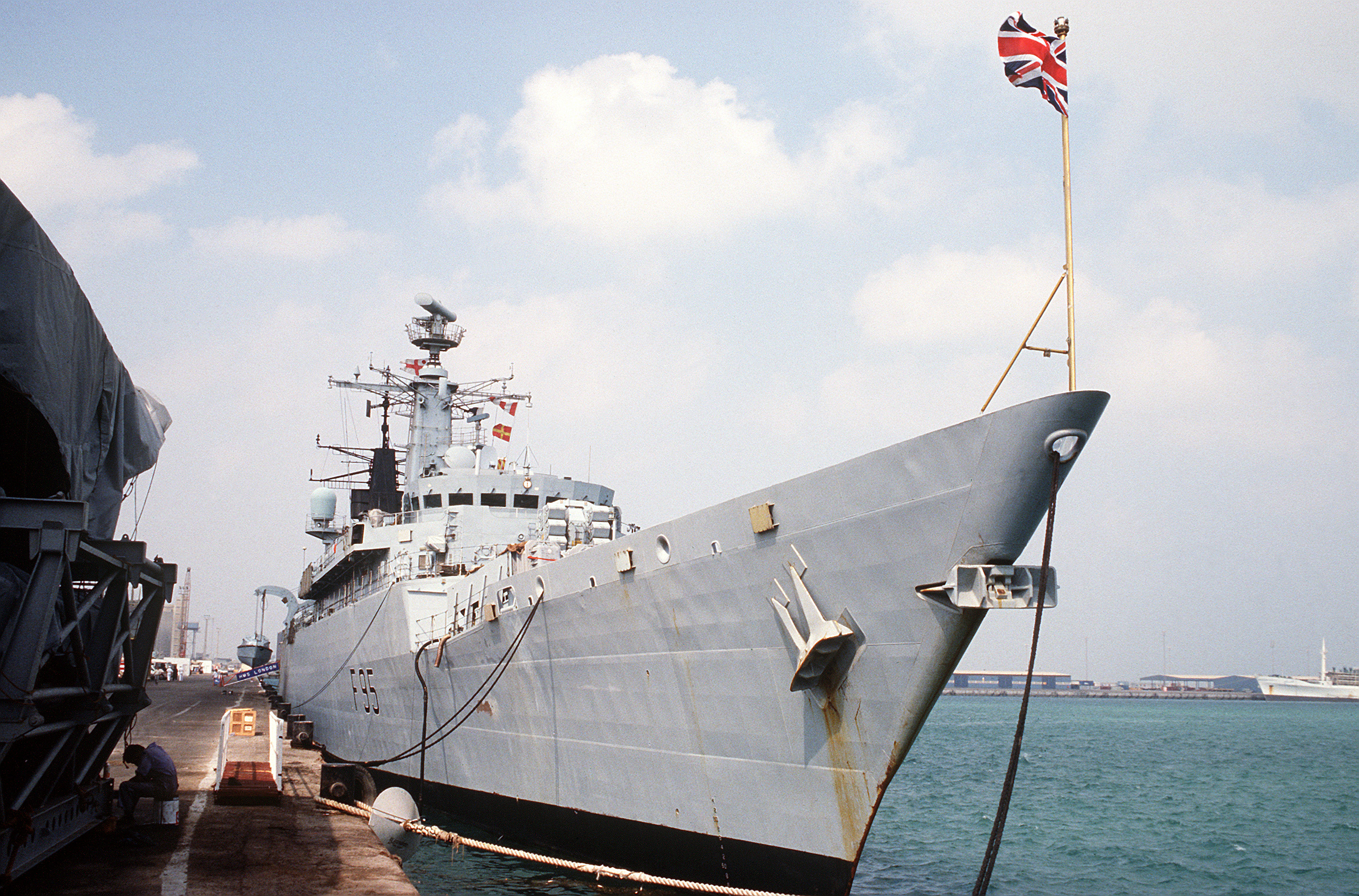
HMS London (F95) docked in port during Operation Desert Shield.

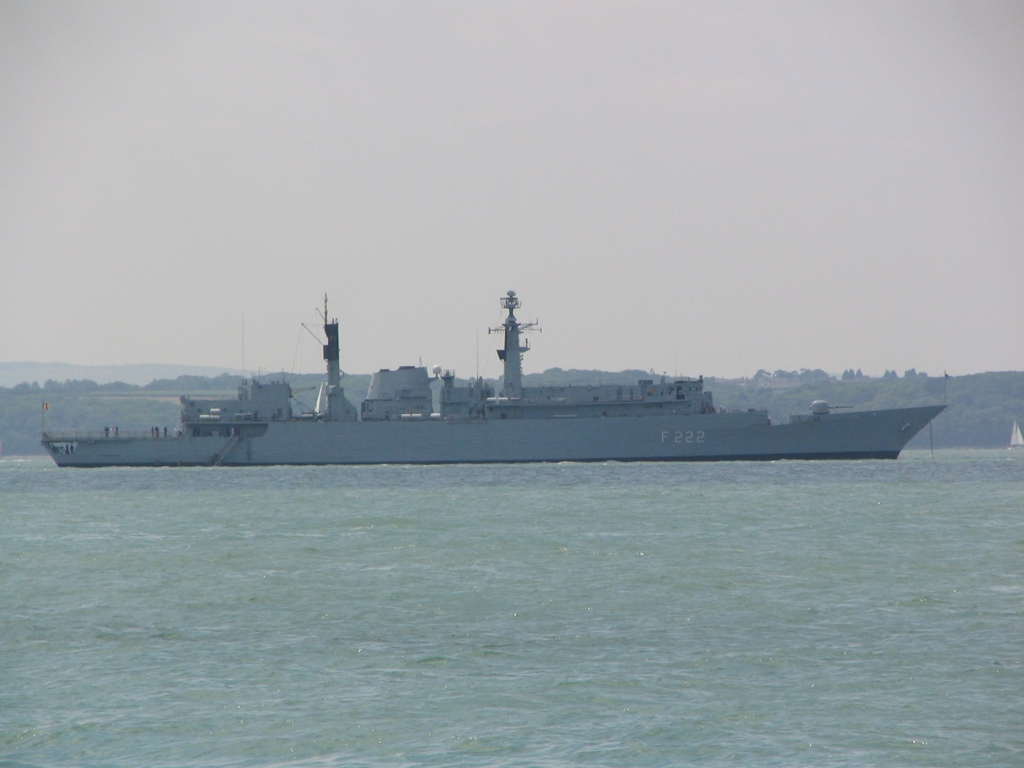
Romanian frigate Regina Maria at the Trafalgar 200th Anniversary.

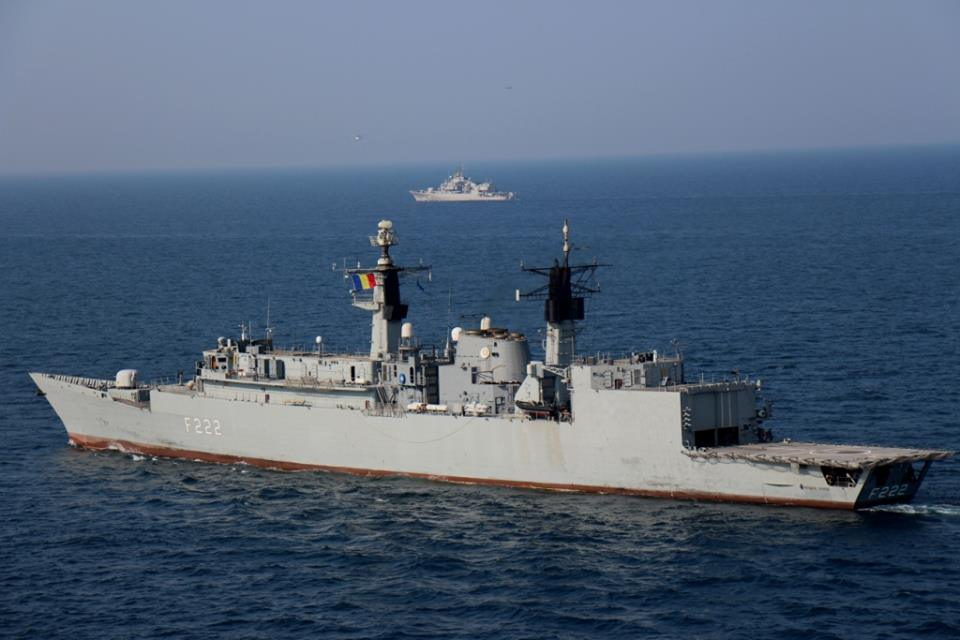
Regina Maria during Exercise Sea Breeze 2016.

== See also ==
- NMS Regina Maria (Regele Ferdinand-class destroyer), a World War II-era namesake

== Publications ==
- Colledge, J. J.; Warlow, Ben (2006) [1969]. Ships of the Royal Navy: The Complete Record of All Fighting Ships of the Royal Navy from the 15th Century to the Present (3rd Rev ed.). London: Chatham Publishing. ISBN 978-1-86176-281-8. OCLC 67375475.
