= Charles Vyvyan =

British Army officer

Major General Charles Vyvyan CB CBE
- Born: 29 September 1944 (age 82)
- Military career
- Allegiance: United Kingdom
- Branch: British Army
- Service years: 1967–2000
- Rank: Major General
- Commands: 3rd Infantry Brigade; 1st Battalion Royal Green Jackets
- Conflicts: Dhofar War; The Troubles
- Awards: Companion of the Order of the Bath; Commander of the Order of the British Empire; Mentioned in Despatches

Major General Charles Gerard Courtenay Vyvyan, CB, CBE (born 29 September 1944) is a retired British Army officer. He served as head of the British Defence Staff and Defence Attaché in Washington, D.C. (1997–2000), and Gentleman Usher of the Scarlet Rod (2006–2018).

== Early life and education ==
Vyvyan was born on 29 September 1944 to Elizabeth and John Vyvyan. His father was a diplomat, British Army veteran, and history fellow at Trinity College, Cambridge. He was educated at Winchester College, an all-boys private school in Winchester, Hampshire. He studied modern history at Balliol College, Oxford, graduating with Bachelor of Arts degree in 1966.

== Military career ==
Vyvyan was commissioned into the Royal Green Jackets in 1967. After a two-year secondment to the Sultan of Oman's Land Forces in the mid-1970s, he became commanding officer of the 1st Battalion Royal Green Jackets in 1984, commander of the 3rd Infantry Brigade in 1988 and Deputy Chief of Staff at Headquarters UK Land Forces in 1994. He went on to be Head of the British Defence Staff and Defence Attaché in Washington, D.C. in 1997 before retiring in 2000.

== Later life ==
Vyvyan was a visiting fellow at the Eisenhower Institute in Washington, D.C., from 2002 to 2006. He was appointed Gentleman Usher of the Scarlet Rod in 2006: he stepped down in 2018.

Military offices
Preceded by Anthony Blackburn	Head of the British Defence Staff in Washington, D.C. 1997–2000	Succeeded by John Thompson
Court offices
Preceded by Iain Henderson	Gentleman Usher of the Scarlet Rod; 2006–2018	Succeeded by James Gordon
