= Thomas Browne (officer of arms) =

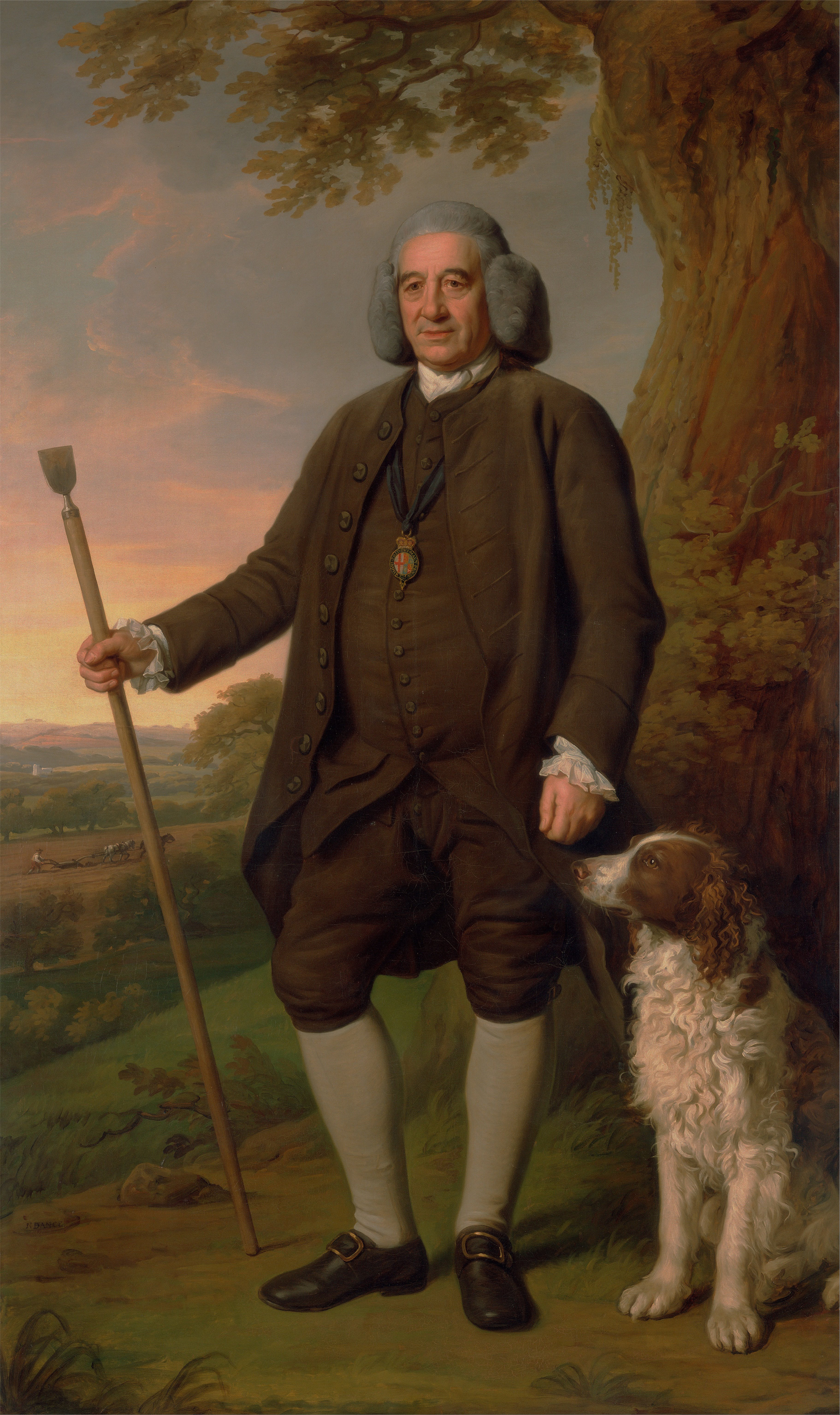
- Thomas 'Sense' Browne by Nathaniel Dance-Holland, 1775
- Born: 19 November 1708; Ashbourne
- Died: 1780; Great James Street, London
- Occupation: Officer of arms
- Parent: John Browne

Thomas Browne (1708–1780), Garter Principal King of Arms, the second son of John Browne of Ashbourne, Derbyshire, became Blanche Lyon Pursuivant in 1727, Bluemantle Pursuivant in 1737, Lancaster Herald in 1743, Norroy and Ulster King of Arms in 1761, and Garter in 1774 until his death.

== Biography ==
Browne was the most eminent land surveyor in the kingdom, and was called Sense Browne, to distinguish him from his contemporary, Lancelot Brown, who was usually called Capability Brown. At first he resided at his seat of Little Wimley near Stevenage, Hertfordshire, which "he received with his wife." He later moved to Camville Place, Essendon. Browne died at his town house in St. James's Street (now called Great James Street), Bedford Row, on 22 February 1780. His portrait was engraved by W. Dickinson, from a painting by Nathaniel Dance-Holland.

== Arms ==
Coat of arms of Thomas Browne
Adopted 1761 Crest (1) From a crown palisado (Vallary) or a buck's head sable attired or (Nedham); (2) a griffin's head erased sable, beak & ears or, charged on the neck with a bar gemel argent & a trefoil ermine (Browne). Escutcheon Sable, 3 lions passant between 2 bendlets argent all between 2 trefoils ermine. Motto Si Sit Prudentia ("If there be but prudence" (from Juvenal))
