= Michael Conway (British Army officer) =

British Army officer

Major General Michael Conway CB
- Born: Michael David Conway
- Military career
- Allegiance: United Kingdom
- Branch: British Army
- Rank: Major General
- Commands: Director General, Army Legal Services Branch
- Awards: Companion of the Order of the Bath

Major General Michael David Conway CB is a retired British Army officer and barrister. From October 2010 to September 2015, he was Director-General of the Army Legal Services Branch.

== Early life ==
Conway was born in Grimsby, Lincolnshire, England. He studied law at King's College London and graduated in 1981. He was called to the Bar of England and Wales in 1982.

== Honours ==
Conway was appointed Companion of the Order of the Bath (CB) in the 2015 New Year Honours.
