= Lancaster Herald =

- The heraldic badge of Lancaster Herald of Arms in Ordinary
- Heraldic tradition: Gallo-British
- Jurisdiction: England, Wales and Northern Ireland
- Governing body: College of Arms

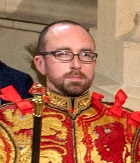
Adam Tuck, as Rouge Dragon, at the 2022 State Opening of Parliament

Lancaster Herald of Arms in Ordinary is an English officer of arms at the College of Arms in London. The title of Lancaster Herald first occurs in 1347 at Calais, and to begin with this officer was a servant to the noble House of Lancaster. As a retainer of John of Gaunt (1377–1399) Lancaster was advanced to the rank of King of Arms, and was later promoted to the royal household of Henry IV (Gaunt's son), and made king of the northern province. This arrangement continued until 1464, when Lancaster reverted to the rank of herald. Since the reign of Henry VII (1485–1509) Lancaster has been a herald in ordinary. The badge of office is a red rose of Lancaster, royally crowned.

The current Lancaster Herald of Arms is Adam Tuck.

== Holders of the office ==
Arms	Name	Date of appointment	Ref
Lancaster Herald to the Earl or Duke of Lancaster
	Herman (surname unknown)	(1354)	
	John (surname unknown)	(1358)	
	Nicholas (surname unknown)	(1366)	
	Roger Durroit.	(1386)	
	Richard Bruges	(Richard II)	
Lancaster King of Arms in Ordinary
	Richard Bruges	(Richard II)	
	John Ashwell	(1426)	
	William Boys	(1436)	
	William Tyndale	(1447)	
Lancaster Herald of Arms in Ordinary
	James Collier or Collyer	(Edward IV)	
	Richard Ashwell	(Edward IV)	
	(name unknown)	(1486)	
	Thomas Wall	1509–1526	
	William Jennings or Jenys (Note: made visitation at Carmarthen in 1530.)	1526–1527	
	William Fellows	1527–1531	
	Fulk ap Howell (Note: Re-instated 1539, executed for counterfeiting Clarenceaux's seal, December 1549.)	1531–1536	
	Thomas Milner (Note: condemned for his submission to Robert Aske.)	1536–1538	
	Nicholas Tubman	1553–1559	
	John Cocke	1559–1588	
	Nicholas Paddy	1588–1602	
	Francis Thynne	1602–1609	
	Nicholas Charles	1609–1613	
	William Penson	1613–1637	
	Thomas Thompson	1637–1641	
	William Ryley	1641–1658	
	George Barkham	1658–1660	
	William Ryley	1660–1665	
	Robert Chaloner	1665–1676	
	Francis Sandford	1676–1689	
	Gregory King	1689–1712	
	Rowland Fryth	1712–1713	
	John Hesketh	1713–1727	
	Stephen Leake	1727–1729	
	Charles Greene	1729–1743	
	Thomas Browne	1743–1761	
	Sir Isaac Heard	1761–1774	
	Thomas Lock	1774–1781	
	Charles Townley (Note: Son of Sir Charles Townley)	1781–1793	
	Edmund Lodge	1793–1822	
	George Frederick Beltz	1822–1841	
	Sir Albert Woods	1841–1869	
	George Edward Cokayne	1870–1882	
	Edward Bellasis	1882–1922	
	Archibald Russell	1922–1954	
	John Walker	1954–1968	
	Sedley Andrus	1972–1982	
	Sir Peter Gwynn-Jones	1982–1995	
	Robert Noel	1999–2021	
	Adam Tuck	2023–present	

== See also ==
- Heraldry
- Officer of Arms
