= Isaac Heard =

British officer of arms

Sir Isaac Heard KG
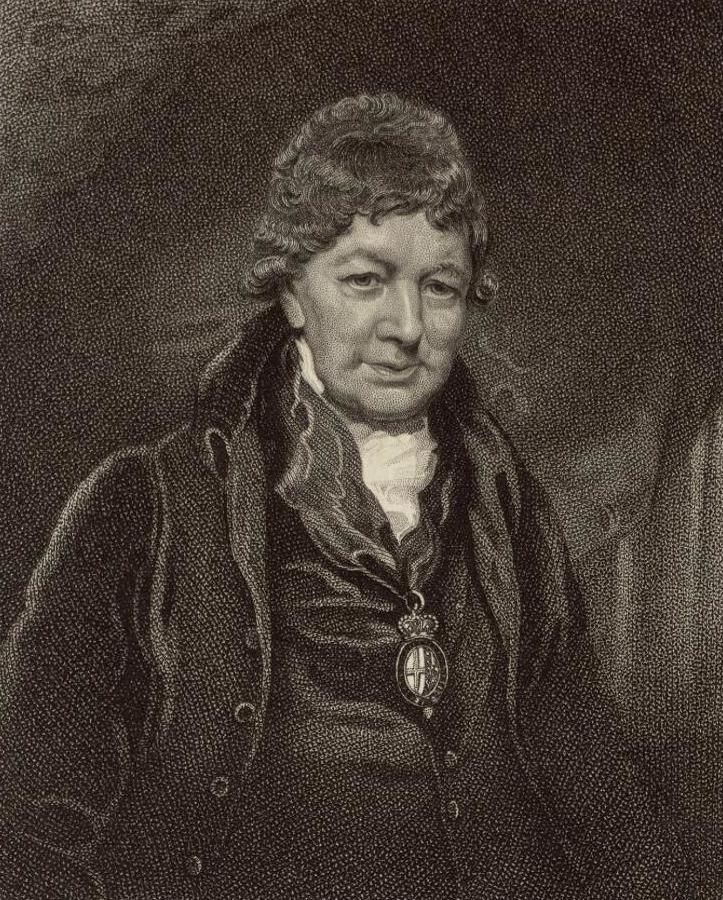
- Sir Isaac Heard

Garter Principal King of Arms
- In office 1784–1822
- Monarchs: George III, George IV
- Preceded by: Ralph Bigland
- Succeeded by: Sir George Nayler

Personal details
- Born: 21 December 1730 Ottery St Mary, Devon, England
- Died: 29 April 1822 (aged 91) College of Arms, London
- Spouses: Katherine Tyler (m. 1770; died 1783) Alicia Felton nee Hayes (m. 1787; died 1808)
- Relatives: Sir David Ochterlony (stepson)

Sir Isaac Heard (21 December [O.S. 10 December] 1730 – 29 April 1822) was a British officer of arms who served as Garter Principal King of Arms, the senior officer of arms of the College of Arms in London, from 1784 until his death in 1822. In this role, he oversaw several notable cases and also officiated at all the funerals of the royal family.

A native of Devon, Heard had a brief career in the Navy, before switching careers at age 29, when he became the Bluemantle Pursuivant of Arms in Ordinary. He would go on to hold the posts of Lancaster Herald of Arms in Ordinary, Norroy King of Arms and Brunswick Herald. Heard was knighted in the Order of the Garter in 1786.

== Early life ==
Heard was born in Ottery St Mary, Devon to John Heard and wife Elizabeth Michell, daughter and heir of Benjamin Michell of the Great Seaside House in Branscombe. His grandfather, also named Isaac Heard, was a merchant who resided in Cork and Bridgwater, and had roots in Wiltshire.

He was educated at Honiton Grammar School before joining the Royal Navy as a volunteer at age 15, on HMS Lynn, commanded by Captain Robert Man. On the Lynn brought him to the Mediterranean Sea, allowing him to visit Greece, Italy and locations on the Adriatic Sea. In 1749, he continued as a midshipman aboard HMS Blandford. In August 1750, he was very nearly killed off the coast of Guinea, when a storm swept him overboard. Fortunately for him, he was swept off with the mast and he was quickly spotted in the water clinging to the mast and saved from drowning by midshipman Robert Kingsmill, who later became an Admiral and was made a baronet. He and Kingsmill remained close friends for life. Heard's own coat of arms, which he adopted in 1762, depicted the event.

== Career ==
Heard was doubtful of his future in the Navy during peacetime, so in 1751, he began working as a merchant in Bilbao on the Bay of Biscay. His stay in Bilbao was cut short after the start of the Seven Years' War in 1756, when tensions between Spain and Britain forced him to return to London in 1757. In London, he continued working as a merchant.

In London, Heard met the Deputy Earl Marshal, Thomas Howard, 2nd Earl of Effingham, who noticed Heard's interest in antiquities. Effingham helped Heard began his heraldic career as Bluemantle Pursuivant of Arms in Ordinary in December 1759. He would go on to hold the posts of Lancaster Herald of Arms in Ordinary, Norroy King of Arms and Brunswick King of Arms. In 1784, he was appointed Garter Principal King of Arms. It was in this capacity that he helped to plan the funeral of Horatio Nelson, 1st Viscount Nelson.

Heard was knighted in the Order of the Garter on 2 June 1786.

== Personal life ==
Heard married Katherine Tyler, born in Boston to a family of English settlers, who was the widow of Captain David Ochterlony of Scotland. After Captain Ochterlony died in the West Indies, Tyler moved back to England. She had four children; her oldest was Sir David Ochterlony, 1st Baronet, who rose to the rank of Major General in the East India Company. Heard became a close confidant of his stepson.

His wife Katherine died in 1783. Four years later, Heard married a second time to Alicia Felton née Hayes (d. 1808), widow of John George Felton, a customs inspector-general for the Leeward Islands. Heard had no children of his own with either wife.

Heard continued as Garter until his death at the College of Arms in 1822 at the age of 91. Per his request, he was buried behind the altar in St George's Chapel, Windsor Castle.

== Arms ==
The Heard of Kinsale had been granted a crest in the 16th century; but Isaac Heard's descent was unproven. It was very similar to Yarde of Devon, and Heard may have been "Yarde" or "Yeard" previously. Argent, a chevron gules between three bougets sable. Crest: A demi-goat proper, horns, hooves and tufts or with a crown or about its neck with the motto:Toujours fidèle ("Always faithful").

Coat of arms of Heard Family
Crest A demi-goat proper, horns, hooves and tufts or with a crown or about its neck Escutcheon Argent, a chevron gules between three bougets sable. Motto Toujours fidèle ("Always faithful")

Heard was granted arms in 1762 when he became the Lancaster Herald of Arms in Ordinary. His arms portray his near-death experience at sea, as does his motto, Naufragus in portum ("Shipwreck brought me into port").

Coat of arms of Sir Isaac Heard
Adopted 22 November 1762 Crest A swan, the wings elevated argent, beaked & membered sable charged on the breast with a rose gules barbed and seeded proper, ducally crowned & chained or. Escutcheon Argent, in base a Neptune with an Eastern crown or, his trident sable headed or, issuing from a stormy ocean, the left hand grasping the head of a ship's mast appearing above the waves as part of a wreck proper, on a chief azure the Arctic Polar Star of the first. (1774: grant removing: between two water bougets of the second.) Motto Naufragus in Portum ("Shipwreck brought me into port") Symbolism The arms symbolises his 1750 accident at sea, he was washed overboard and nearly drowned. The Rose symbolize Lancaster for his position when he was granted the arms.

== Epitaph by Thomas Moore ==
Heard is mentioned in the poem Epitaph on a tuft-hunter by Thomas Moore 1779-1852:

Lament, lament, Sir Isaac Heard,
Put mourning round thy page, Debrett,
For here lies one who ne'er preferred
A Viscount to a Marquis yet.

Beside him place the God of Wit,
Before him Beauty's rosiest girls,
Apollo for a _star_ he'd quit,
And Love's own sister for an Earl's.

Did niggard fate no peers afford,
He took of course to peers' relations;
And rather than not sport a Lord
Put up with even the last creations;

Even Irish names could he but tag 'em
With "Lord" and "Duke," were sweet to call;
And at a pinch Lord Ballyraggum
Was better than no Lord at all.

Heaven grant him now some noble nook,
For rest his soul! he'd rather be
Genteelly damned beside a Duke,
Than saved in vulgar company.

== See also ==
- Heraldry
- Pursuivant
- King of Arms

Heraldic offices
Preceded by John Ward	Bluemantle Pursuivant of Arms in Ordinary; 1759–1761	Succeeded by Henry Pugolas
Preceded by Thomas Browne	Lancaster Herald; 1761–1774	Succeeded by Thomas Locke
Preceded by Ralph Bigland	Norroy King of Arms; 1774–1780	Succeeded by Peter Dore
Preceded by Ralph Bigland	Clarenceux King of Arms; 1780–1784	Succeeded by Thomas Lock
Preceded by Ralph Bigland	Garter Principal King of Arms; 1784–1822	Succeeded by Sir George Nayler
