= Edmund Lodge =

English officer of arms, writer and a compiler of short biographies (1756–1839)

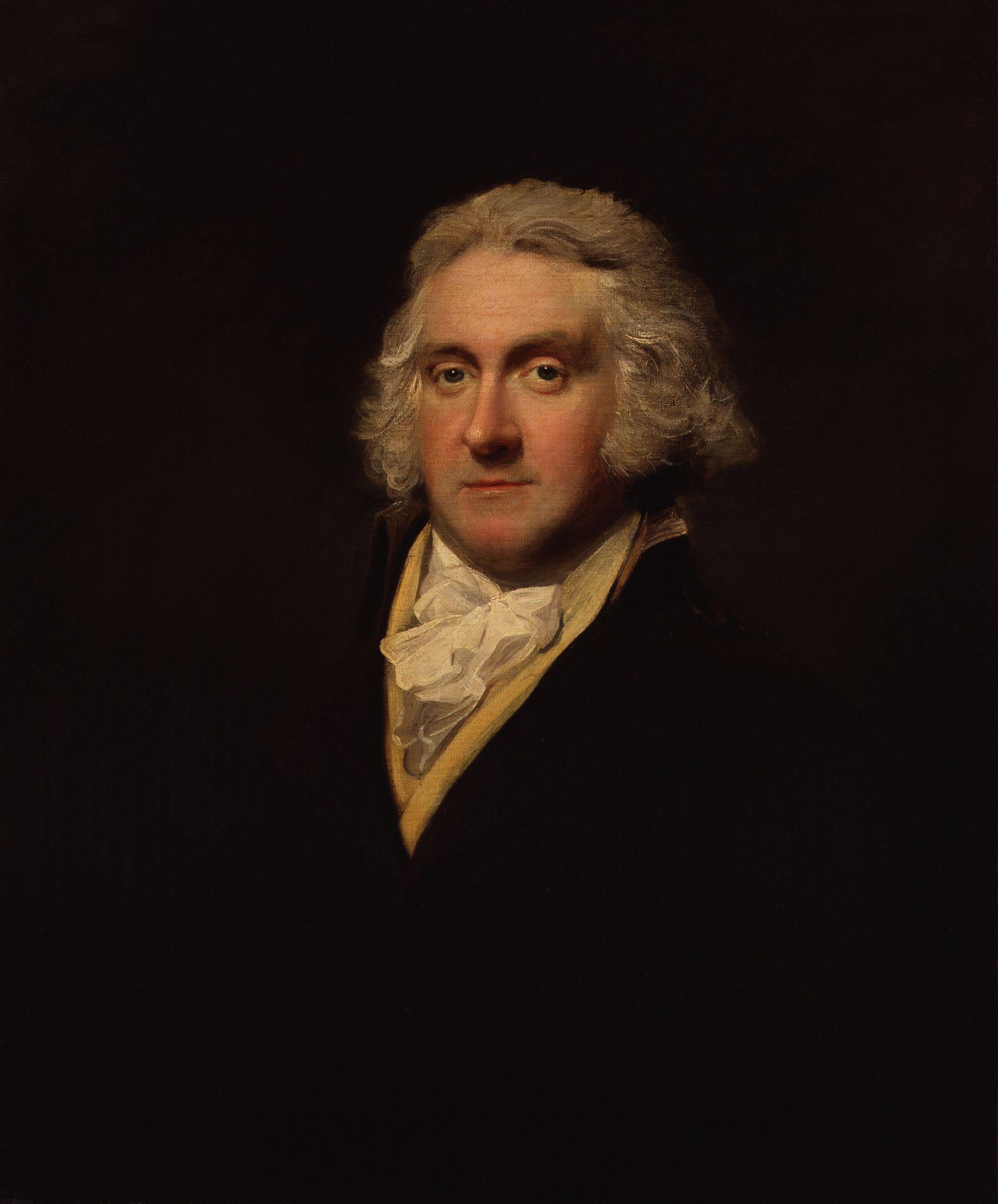
Portrait of Edmund Lodge by Lemuel Francis Abbott, circa 1790–95

Edmund Lodge, KH (1756–1839), herald, was a long-serving English officer of arms, a writer on heraldic subjects, and a compiler of short biographies.

== Life and career ==
Lodge was born in Poland Street, London on 13 June 1756, the son of Edmund Lodge, rector of Carshalton, Surrey and his wife, Mary Garrard, daughter of Richard Garrard of Carshalton. Little is known of his education, but he briefly held a cornet's commission in the army, which he resigned in 1773. In 1782 he became Bluemantle Pursuivant of Arms in Ordinary at the College of Arms. He subsequently became Lancaster Herald of Arms in Ordinary, Norroy King of Arms, and Clarenceux King of Arms, in other words second in command of the college. In 1832, he was appointed Knight of the Hanoverian Royal Guelphic Order, but was not subsequently made a knight bachelor to entitle him to the prefix Sir, which often came with appointments to that order. He married Jane-Anne-Elizabeth Field (died May 1820) on 27 April 1808, but they had no children. He died at his house in Bloomsbury Square, London on 16 January 1839.

== Publications ==
Lodge wrote Illustrations of British History, Biography, and Manners in the Reigns of Henry VIII, Edward VI, Mary, Elizabeth and James I (3 vols., 1791), which consisted of selections from the manuscripts of the Howard, Talbot and Cecil families preserved at the College of Arms. He also wrote Life of Sir Julius Caesar (2nd ed., 1827). He contributed the literary matter to Portraits of Illustrious Personages of Great Britain (1814, &c.), an elaborate work of which a popular edition is included in Bohn's Illustrated Library. His most important work on heraldry was The Genealogy of the Existing British Peerage (1832; enlarged edition, 1859). In The Annual Peerage and Baronetage (1827–1829), reissued after 1832 as Peerage of the British Empire, and generally known as Lodge's Peerage, his share did not go beyond the title-page.

== Works ==
- Edmund Lodge Portraits of Illustrious Personages of Great Britain with... Later the plates, copyrights and future book sales were sold at auction for £4200 to W. Smith, and appeared in numerous publications.
- Online:
  - vol. 1
  - vol. 2
  - vol. 3
  - vol. 4
  - vol. 5
  - vol. 6
  - vol. 7
  - vol. 8
- Edmund Lodge The Genealogy of the Existing British Peerage, Saunders and Otley, 1832. at Google Books
- Edmund Lodge The Genealogy of the Existing British Peerage, 1859. at Google Books

== Arms ==
Coat of arms of Edmund Lodge
Granted 12 June 1822 Crest A demi-lion holding in the dexter paw a cross crosslet fitchy gules & charged on the shoulder with a rose gules. Escutcheon Azure, within a bordure flory a lion rampant argent, on a canton argent a rose gules. Symbolism The roses allude 'to the badge of the Royal House of Lancaster by whom his office of Lancaster Herald was instituted'.
