= Family history society =

Society that shares knowledge on genealogy and family history

A family history society or genealogical society is a society, often charitable or not-for-profit, that allows member genealogists and family historians to profit from shared knowledge. Large societies often own libraries, sponsor research seminars and foreign trips, and publish journals. Some societies concentrate on a specific niche, such as the family history of a particular geographical area, ethnicity, nationality, or religion. Lineage societies, also called hereditary societies, are societies that limit their membership to descendants of a particular person or group of people of historical importance. Nobility associations gather persons who belong to a country's nobility under current or historical law and can prove it.

== National and international societies ==
- American Society of Genealogists
- Federation of Family History Societies (FFHS) (UK)
- Federation of Genealogical Societies (FGS) (US)
- Genealogical and Heraldic Office of Belgium
- Guild of One-Name Studies (UK)
- National Genealogical Society (NGS) (US)
- Society of Genealogists (UK)
- Genealogical Society of South Africa

== Regional societies ==
=== Australia ===
- Australian Jewish Genealogical Society
- Queensland Family History Society
- Royal Historical Society of Queensland
- Society of Australian Genealogists

=== Canada ===
- New Brunswick Genealogical Society
- Ontario Genealogical Society

=== England ===
- Buckinghamshire Family History Society
- Cambridge University Heraldic and Genealogical Society
- Cleveland Family History Society
- East Yorkshire Family History Society
- East Surrey Family History Society
- Manchester and Lancashire Family History Society
- Northumberland and Durham Family History Society
- Suffolk Family History Society
- Sussex Family History Group (covering East and West Sussex)
- Upper Dales Family History Group
- Yorkshire Archaeological Society, Family History Section

=== Ireland ===
- Genealogical Society of Ireland
- Clans of Ireland

=== Scotland ===
- Borders Family History Society
- Scottish Association of Family History Societies – a federation of around 30 regional and local FHSes throughout Scotland

=== South Africa ===
- Genealogical Society of South Africa

=== United States ===
- California Genealogical Society and Library
- Genealogical Society of Pennsylvania
- Genealogical Society of Utah
- New England Historic Genealogical Society (NEHGS)
- New York Genealogical and Biographical Society
- Utah Genealogical Association (UGA)

== Ethnic societies ==
- American-French Genealogical Society
- International Association of Jewish Genealogical Societies
- Jewish Genealogical Society of Great Britain
- Afro-American Historical and Genealogical Society

== Nobility associations ==
- CILANE, which includes, among others, the following:
  - Croatian Nobility Association
  - Danish Nobility Association
  - Finnish House of Nobility
  - Réunion de la Noblesse Pontificale
  - Corpo della Nobiltà Italiana
  - Swedish House of Nobility
- Russian Nobility Association in America
- Polish Nobility Association
- Kasumi Kaikan

== See also ==
- Family association
- List of hereditary and lineage organizations
- List of historical societies
- List of Mormon family organizations
