= East Surrey (disambiguation) =

East Surrey is a future unitary authority in South East England.

East Surrey may also refer to:

- East Surrey (constituency), a UK Parliament constituency
- East Surrey College
- East Surrey Hospital
- East Surrey Regiment

== See also ==
- East Surrey Family History Society
- East Surrey Learning Partnership
- Surrey (disambiguation)
