= SFHS =

SFHS can refer to:

== High schools ==
- Strawberry Fields High School, India
- Saint Francis High School (Athol Springs), New York
- Saint Francis High School (La Cañada Flintridge), California
- Saint Francis High School (Mountain View), California
- Saint Francis High School (St. Francis, Wisconsin)
- St. Francis High School (Traverse City, Michigan)
- St. Francis High School (Wheaton, Illinois)
- Santa Fe High School (disambiguation)
- Segerstrom Fundamental High School, Orange County, California
- Seventy-First High School, Fayetteville, North Carolina
- South Fork High School, Stuart, Florida
- South Forsyth High School, Georgia
- Spanish Fort High School, Spanish Fort, Alabama
- Spring-Ford High School, Royersford, Pennsylvania

== Associations ==
- Shropshire Family History Society, genealogical society in the United Kingdom
- Society for French Historical Studies, American society for the study of French history
- Suffolk Family History Society, a genealogical society in the United Kingdom
- The Swedish-Finn Historical Society, a genealogical society in the United States
