= 1881 United Kingdom census =

Census of the population of the United Kingdom

Census 1881
- 3 April 1881
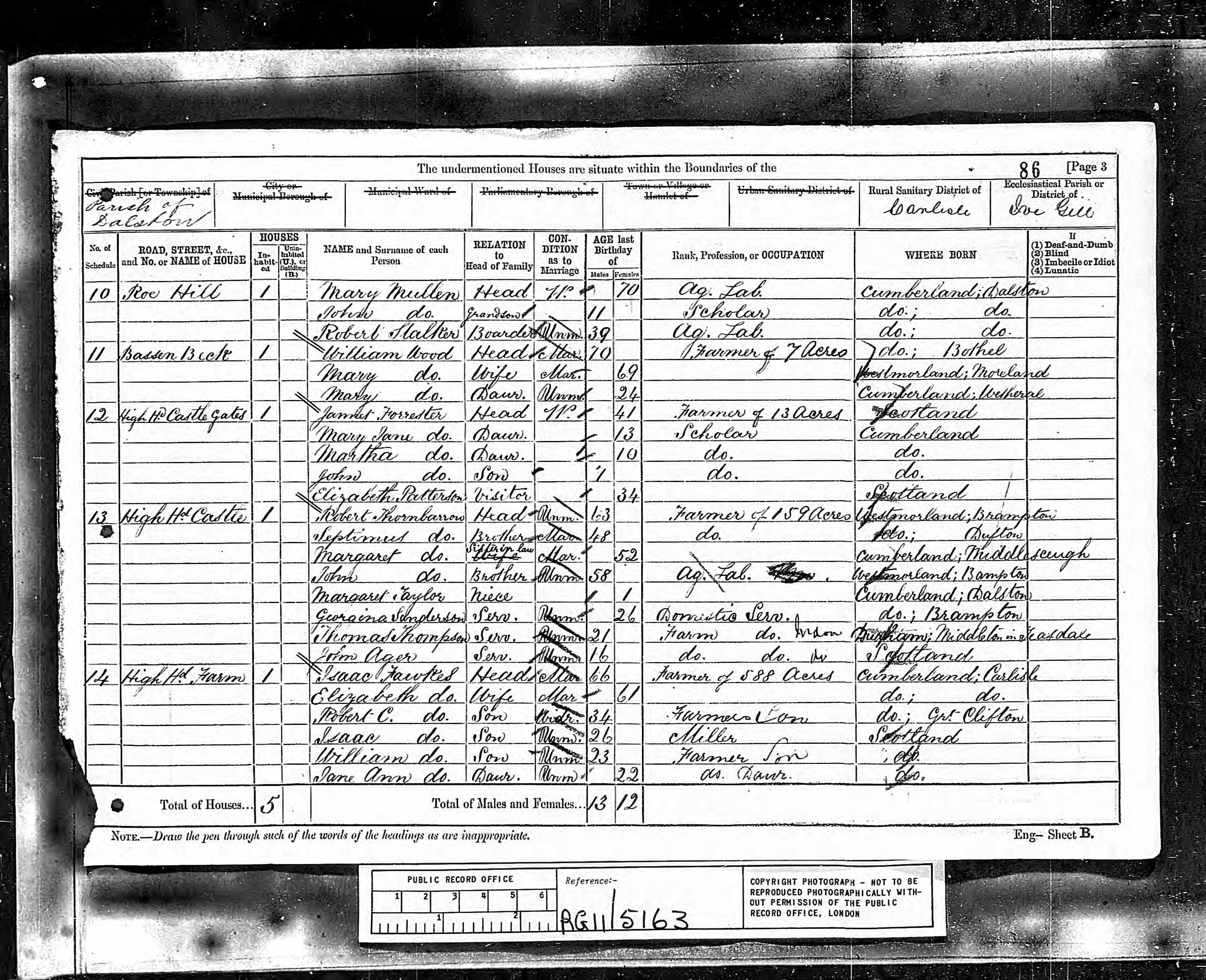

General information
- Country: United Kingdom

The United Kingdom Census of 1881 recorded the people residing in every household on the night of Sunday 3 April 1881, and was the fifth of the UK censuses to include details of household members.

== Data recorded ==
Details collected include: address, name, relationship to the head of the family, marital status, age at last birthday, gender, occupation, and place of birth. As with earlier censuses, the form asked whether any "lunatics", "imbeciles" or "idiots" lived in the household, causing the Registrar General to observe that: "It is against human nature to expect a mother to admit her young child to be an idiot, however much she may fear this to be true. To acknowledge the fact is to abandon all hope."

The total population of England, Wales and Scotland was recorded as 29,707,207.

Notables named in the census included Winston Churchill, Karl Marx and Charles Darwin.

== Indexing ==
The 1881 census was the first UK census to be indexed in its entirety. In the 1980s, in a project that has been characterised as "the largest collection of historical source material to be made available in computerised form", and "the first major 'crowd-sourced' exercise in the world", the Genealogical Society of Utah began collaborating with the Federation of Family History Societies and the Scottish Association of Family History Societies to produce an index to the 1881 census for England, Wales, Scotland, the Channel Islands and the Isle of Man.

In 1994 and 1995 the resulting index was published, county by county, on microfiche, and made available to institutions. In 1999 the index was published on a set of 24 CD-ROMs and made available to the general public.

In August 2001 the index for Scotland was made available online on Scots Origins, then the official data site of the General Register Office for Scotland, and is now available on its successor ScotlandsPeople. In February 2003, the remaining material was made available free of charge on the FamilySearch website. Free access to the online index is now available from several other sites, though the Scottish data remains exclusive to ScotlandsPeople.

== Results ==
=== Scotland ===
The 1881 census in Scotland was the first census to count the numbers of Gaelic speakers.

Registration county	Population	Number of Gaelic speakers	% Gaelic speakers
Lanark	942,193	11,500	1.2%
Edinburgh	388,836	2,145	0.6%
Aberdeen	269,047	604	0.2%
Forfar	268,653	590	0.2%
Renfrew	225,611	4,199	1.9%
Ayr	217,630	649	0.3%
Fife	172,131	126	0.1%
Perth	130,282	14,537	11.2%
Stirling	106,883	441	0.4%
Inverness	86,389	60,447	70.0%
Argyll	80,761	50,113	62.1%
Ross and Cromarty	79,467	56,767	71.4%
Dumbarton	78,182	1,423	1.8%
Dumfries	76,167	17	0.0%
Banff	59,783	330	0.6%
Roxburgh	52,592	25	0.0%
Elgin (or Moray)	45,084	1,273	2.8%
Linlithgow	44,005	47	0.1%
Kirkcudbright	42,290	11	0.0%
Caithness	39,859	4,246	10.7%
Haddington	38,510	294	0.8%
Wigtown	38,448	28	0.1%
Kincardine	35,465	18	0.1%
Berwick	35,273	43	0.1%
Orkney	32,044	36	0.1%
Shetland	29,705	12	0.0%
Selkirk	26,346	8	0.0%
Clackmannan	24,025	86	0.4%
Sutherland	22,376	16,776	75.0%
Bute	17,634	3,725	21.1%
Peebles	13,688	3	0.0%
Nairn	8,847	1,068	12.1%
Kinross	7,330	15	0.2%
Total	3,735,536	231,602	6.2%

Table above according to Return of numbers of gaelic-speaking people of Scotland, under census of 1881.

== See also ==
- Census in the United Kingdom
- List of United Kingdom censuses

Preceded by 1871	UK census 1881	Succeeded by 1891
