= Kal Seaman =

Canadian politician (1915–2008)

Dr. Kal Seaman

Member of the New Brunswick Legislative Assembly for Kings Centre
- In office 1987–1991
- Preceded by: Harold Fanjoy
- Succeeded by: Georgie Day

Personal details
- Born: December 7, 1915 Liverpool, Nova Scotia, Canada
- Died: March 2, 2008 (aged 92) Saint John, New Brunswick, Canada
- Party: Liberal
- Spouse: Gertrude Mavis Clarke
- Children: 2
- Occupation: Surgeon

Dr. Killem "Kal" Seaman (December 7, 1915 – March 2, 2008) was a Canadian politician. He served in the Legislative Assembly of New Brunswick from 1987 to 1991 as a Liberal member from the constituency of Kings Centre.
