= Genealogical Society of Pennsylvania =

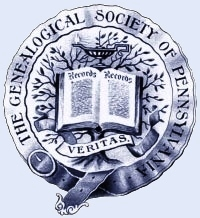
- The organization's seal, used continuously since its 1892 founding
- Formation: 1892; 134 years ago
- Type: Nonprofit
- Website: genpa.org

The Genealogical Society of Pennsylvania (GSP) is a non-profit educational institution headquartered in Philadelphia, Pennsylvania. Founded in 1892, it is one of the oldest genealogical societies in the United States. Its mission is "to provide leadership and support in promoting genealogy through education, preservation and access to Pennsylvania-related genealogical information."

GSP publishes a scholarly magazine and newsletter, conducts educational programs, and maintains a website with research guides for the public and a databases for its members. GSP is a member of the Federation of Genealogical Societies (FGS) in the United States and the Federation of Family History Societies (FFHS) in the United Kingdom. In September 2008, GSP was the lead local sponsor of the Federation of Genealogical Societies' Annual Conference in Philadelphia.

== Resources ==
For the general public, GSP provides online research guidance through a growing series of topic-specific resources and a list of GSP members who are professional genealogists. Members of the society may also avail themselves of a number of private databases on the GSP website. Visitors to the library may access GSP's extensive collection of third-party CD-ROM publications, which focus on, but are not limited to, Pennsylvania genealogy.

== Events ==
GSP sponsors educational programs throughout the year. The programs vary in length from one-hour lectures to full-day seminars and are hosted at different locations within the state. GSP also periodically co-sponsors events with other organizations.

== Membership ==
Membership in the society is open to individuals and households; nonmember subscriptions to the society's magazine are available for libraries.

Members receive GSP's magazine and newsletter and may access the members only section of the society's web site. Members are also entitled to notice of, and discounts on, GSP-sponsored events and GSP publications.

== Partnership program ==
GSP has instituted a Partnership Program with other organizations having a genealogical constituency. The purpose of the Program is to coordinate efforts in state and local advocacy campaigns, to investigate joint publishing and programming opportunities, and to explore other issues of mutual interest.

GSP partners receive a specialized newsletter and are featured in a specialized partner brochure distributed by GSP. Partners also receive GSP's magazine and newsletter and discounts on GSP publications; other, custom benefits are also possible.

== Publications ==
=== Scholarly magazine ===
The Pennsylvania Genealogical Magazine (PGM), prior to 1948 called Publications of the Genealogical Society of Pennsylvania, is published twice a year, in a biannual volume containing compiled genealogies, Bible records, court records, tombstone inscriptions, and transcriptions of other Pennsylvania sources. Current issues are a benefit of membership, and back issues are available in print through the society's online store.

=== Newsletters ===
GSP's Penn in Hand newsletter is published to inform GSP members of the society's activities and developments, events of interest to Pennsylvania researchers, and genealogical queries from fellow researchers.

Its Partners newsletter is distributed to members of GSP's Partnership Program to inform them of issues of interest to Pennsylvania genealogists.

=== Research aids ===
In addition to its magazine and newsletters, GSP volunteers have compiled, and GSP has published, transcriptions, indexes, and records from throughout Pennsylvania. Some of these publications were available only in limited print runs, but copies can be found at the HSP library and other institutions, and other publications are available for sale to the public through GSP's online store.
