= Buckinghamshire Family History Society =

Charitable society in Buckinghamshire, England

The Buckinghamshire Family History Society (often shortened to Bucks FHS) is a charitable family history society that covers the ceremonial county of Buckinghamshire, England. The society was created in 1976.

The objectives of the Society are:

- To promote and encourage the public study of family history, genealogy, heraldry, local history, and other associated subjects with particular reference to the County of Buckingham.
- To promote the preservation, security and accessibility of archival material.
- To promote and engage in educational activities including the publication and sale of a regular journal and other appropriate material.

The society has just under 1,000 members worldwide and produces a journal called Origins three times each year. It also compiles databases that assist with tracing genealogy in Bucks. A transcription of pre 1837 marriages is complete and a project to transcribe all parish registers to 1901 is well underway. This transcription will include surviving baptisms, marriages and burials. The Society has completed a transcription of the 1851 Census and maintains an index of Buckinghamshire people and an index of wills. Contents of these databases are available for searching and many have been published either in printed media or on CD. In 2006 a new project started to digitise School Record Books.

Local members of the society meet every month in three locations across the county, in Bletchley and in Bourne End.

Bucks FHS is a member of the Family History Federation.
