= Kings Centre (1973–1994 electoral district) =

Defunct provincial electoral district in New Brunswick, Canada

New Brunswick electoral district

Defunct provincial electoral district
- Legislature: Legislative Assembly of New Brunswick
- District created: 1973
- District abolished: 1994
- First contested: 1974
- Last contested: 1991

Kings Centre was a provincial electoral district in New Brunswick, Canada. It was created from the multi-member riding of Kings in the 1973 electoral redistribution, and was abolished in the 1994 electoral redistribution.

== Members of the Legislative Assembly ==
Assembly	Years	Member	Party
Riding created from Kings
48th	1974–1978	Harold Fanjoy	Progressive Conservative
49th	1978–1982	Harold Fanjoy	Progressive Conservative
50th	1982–1987	Harold Fanjoy	Progressive Conservative
51st	1987–1991	Kal Seaman	Liberal
52nd	1991–1995	Georgie Day	Liberal
Riding dissolved into Grand Bay-Westfield and Hampton-Belleisle

== Election results ==
1991 New Brunswick general election
Party	Candidate	Votes	%	±%
Liberal	Georgie Day	3,011	32.04	-18.92
Confederation of Regions	Colby Fraser	2,882	30.67	–
Progressive Conservative	Charles Edward Murray	2,371	25.23	-2.75
New Democratic	Marian Jefferies	1,133	12.06	-3.99
Total valid votes		9,397	100.0	
Liberal hold		Swing		-24.80
Confederation of Regions candidate Colby Fraser gained 26.02 percentage points from his performance in 1987 running as an independent.

1987 New Brunswick general election
Party	Candidate	Votes	%	±%
Liberal	Dr. Kal Seaman	4,419	50.96	+21.94
Progressive Conservative	Harold Newton Fanjoy	2,426	27.98	-25.80
New Democratic	Marian G. Jefferies	1,392	16.05	-1.15
Independent	Calvert M. "Colby" Fraser	403	4.65	–
Independent	Edward Freeman Gaunce	31	0.36	–
Total valid votes		8,671	100.0	
Liberal gain from Progressive Conservative		Swing		+23.87

1982 New Brunswick general election
Party	Candidate	Votes	%	±%
Progressive Conservative	Harold Fanjoy	4,012	53.78	+0.46
Liberal	Edward Kelly	2,165	29.02	-5.56
New Democratic	Marian Jefferies	1,283	17.20	+5.10
Total valid votes		7,460	100.0	
Progressive Conservative hold		Swing		+3.01

1978 New Brunswick general election
Party	Candidate	Votes	%	±%
Progressive Conservative	Harold N. Fanjoy	3,284	53.32	+0.37
Liberal	David L. Nice	2,130	34.58	-6.66
New Democratic	R. Harvey Watson	745	12.10	+8.79
Total valid votes		6,159	100.0	
Progressive Conservative hold		Swing		+3.52

1974 New Brunswick general election
Party	Candidate	Votes	%
Progressive Conservative	Harold Fanjoy	2,939	52.95
Liberal	Murray F. Gault	2,289	41.24
New Democratic	Edward F. Gaunce	184	3.31
Independent	S. Grant Lyon	139	2.50
Total valid votes		5,551	100.0
The previous multi-member riding of Kings went totally Progressive Conservative in the last election. None of the three incumbents ran in this riding.

== See also ==
- List of New Brunswick provincial electoral districts
- Canadian provincial electoral districts
