= East Yorkshire Family History Society =

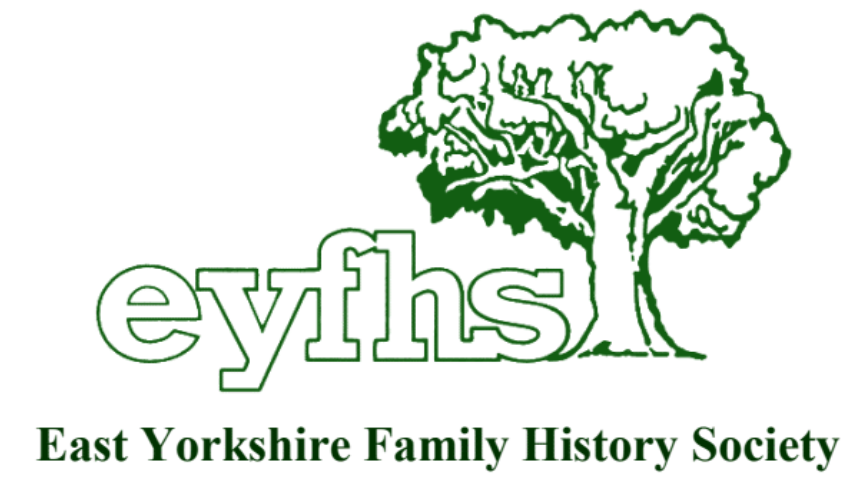
The EYFHS Logo

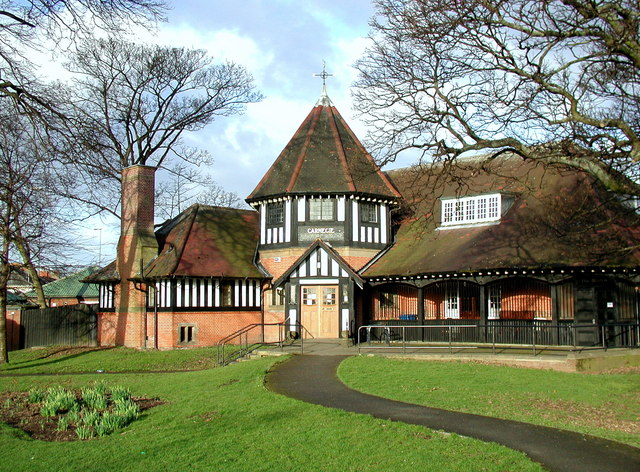
Our Home: The Carnegie Heritage Centre.

The East Yorkshire Family History Society (EYFHS) is an UK based family history society covering the East Riding of Yorkshire and parts of North Yorkshire. It was founded in 1977 and had 1,410 members in 2010. It is a member of the Family History Federation. and registered as UK Charity, N^{o.} 519743.

The society is active in the preservation of local and family history resources and making those resources available to fellow researchers world-wide. To date, the EYFHS has produced in excess of three hundred book-based resources including monumental inscriptions, parish registers, census indexes and research guides. More recently, it has extended its 'traditional' publishing activities by introducing an ever-growing range of electronic publications and resources.

The Society publishes a quarterly journal, The Banyan Tree, and has research facilities in Kingston upon Hull. Its Research Centre is based in the Grade II Listed Carnegie Heritage Centre, a former public library opened in 1905, at the gates of West Park, Kingston upon Hull.

Regular meetings are held in the Carnegie Heritage Centre, where members have access to research resources, physical and online, and advice services.

== Examples of publications ==
- Monumental inscriptions: Bridlington Cemetery : monumental inscriptions. Part three. (2011)) ISBN 978-1-78006-313-3
- Parish Register Transcription series: Mariners Church, Hull : baptisms February 1856 to March 1925. (2011) OCLC 689005498
- Miscellaneous Publications series: J A R Bickford and M E Bickford: East Riding medical men (2007) OCLC 244985296
