= Henry Snyder =

Henry L. Snyder (November 3, 1929 – February 29, 2016) was professor emeritus of history at the University of California, Riverside, and the former director of the Center for Bibliographical Studies and Research. He served as a co-director and the leader of the American English Short Title Catalogue team for more than 32 years.

Dr. Snyder was a senior scholar in the fields of British history, specializing in the early 18th century, and bibliography. He is the author of more than 30 scholarly articles, co-author of a text on English history, The English Heritage (several editions) and Cataloging of the Hand Press: A Comparative and Analytical Study Of Cataloging Rules and Formats Employed in Europe (1994); co-editor of The Scottish World (1981) and The English Short-Title Catalogue: Past, Present, Future (2003); and the editor of The Marlborough-Godolphin Correspondence, published by the Clarendon Press in three volumes in 1975.

He was born November 3, 1929, in Hayward, California. He earned the B.A., M.A. and Ph.D. degrees at the University of California, Berkeley. Dr. Snyder served at the University of Kansas (KU) from 1963 to 1979 rising to the rank of professor, at Louisiana State University at Baton Rouge (LSU) from 1979 to 1986 and from 1986 at the University of California, Riverside, (UCR) where he served as director of the Center for Bibliographical Studies and Research until his retirement at the end of 2009. He served as Dean of Research Administration at KU, Dean of the College of Letters and Sciences at LSU, and Dean of the College of Humanities and Social Sciences at UCR. He was a visiting Lecturer at Bedford College, University of London, 1965–66, and a Fulbright Lecturer at the University of Hamburg in 1974. From 1978 through 2009 Dr. Snyder served as co-director of the English Short Title Catalogue in partnership with the British Library. From 1990 through 2009 he served as director of the California Newspaper Project, which metamorphosed into the California Digital Newspaper Collection. In 2000 he inaugurated CCILA, Catálogo colectivo de impresos latinoamericanos hasta 1851. He developed the prototype for the Hand Press Book File of the Consortium of European Research Libraries (CERL) and was one of the organizers of CERL.

Snyder was a past president of the American Society for Eighteenth Century Studies and served upon the boards of directors of several scholarly organizations. He was a member of IFLA, the International of Federation of Librarian Associations, from 1988 to 2009, serving on the Rare Books and Manuscripts Section, for which he was chair for four years, and the Newspaper Section. He was a member of the board of directors of the Book Club of California from 2009 to 2014 and served as Librarian. He served on the board of directors of the California Genealogical Society, is chair of its Library Committee and Librarian. From 1951 to 1961 he served as an officer in the California Army National Guard, commanding companies in Walnut Creek and Pittsburg. In the latter year he transferred to the Army Reserve, serving until 1978, when he retired as a lieutenant colonel. For more than a decade he served on the consulting faculty and taught at the U S Army Command and General Staff College at Fort Leavenworth, Kansas. He was awarded a Fulbright research fellowship to Germany and senior fellowships from the American Council of Learned Societies and the National Endowment for the Humanities (declined). He was the founding president of the Baton Rouge Opera and also served as the President of the Riverside [Calif.] Opera.

He received one of the 2007 National Humanities Medals His award cited him "for visionary leadership in bridging the worlds of scholarship and technology. His direction of massive projects in the digital humanities has opened new frontiers in cataloguing and preserving ideas and documents for future generations."

At the end of 2009 Queen Elizabeth II was pleased to graciously approve Dr. Snyder's appointment as an honorary officer (O.B.E.) of The Most Excellent Order of the British Empire for "services to English Studies worldwide". In May 2010 he was named emeritus Professor of the year at the University of California, Riverside. He died on February 29, 2016, in Kensington, California.
