= Cleveland Family History Society =

UK history society

The Cleveland Family History Society, more formally The Cleveland, North Yorkshire and South Durham Family History Society, is a family history society that covers this named part of the North-East of England.

It was created in 1979, and its aims are stated as "to promote the study of genealogy and family history and to educate the public therein by holding meetings, sharing information, encouraging research, giving assistance, and producing publications for the public benefit".

It produces a quarterly Journal. Publication schedule March, June, September, December. Editor John Mallaby E. john.mallaby@tiscali.co.uk

It is a member of the Federation of Family History Societies.
