= BFHS =

BFHS may stand for one of several high schools, including:

- Beaver Falls High School (Beaver Falls, Pennsylvania)
- Benjamin Franklin High School (multiple locations in the United States)
- Big Foot High School in (Walworth, Wisconsin)
- Bishop Feehan High School (Attleboro, Massachusetts)
- Bishop Fenwick High School (Peabody, Massachusetts)
- Bishop Fenwick High School (Franklin, Ohio)
- Bishop Foley Catholic High School (Madison Heights, Michigan)
- Bonners Ferry High School (Bonners Ferry, Idaho)

Other uses include:

- Benign fibrous histiocytomas (plural, as BFHs)
- Benjamin F Hunt & Sons, an Austrian porcelain maker from the early 20th century; the "BFHS" marking can be seen on items crafted by the company
- Berkshire Family History Society in England
- Bedfordshire Family History Society in England
- Borders Family History Society in Scotland
- British Federation for Historical Swordplay
