= The Keep, Brighton =

Archive in East Sussex

The Keep
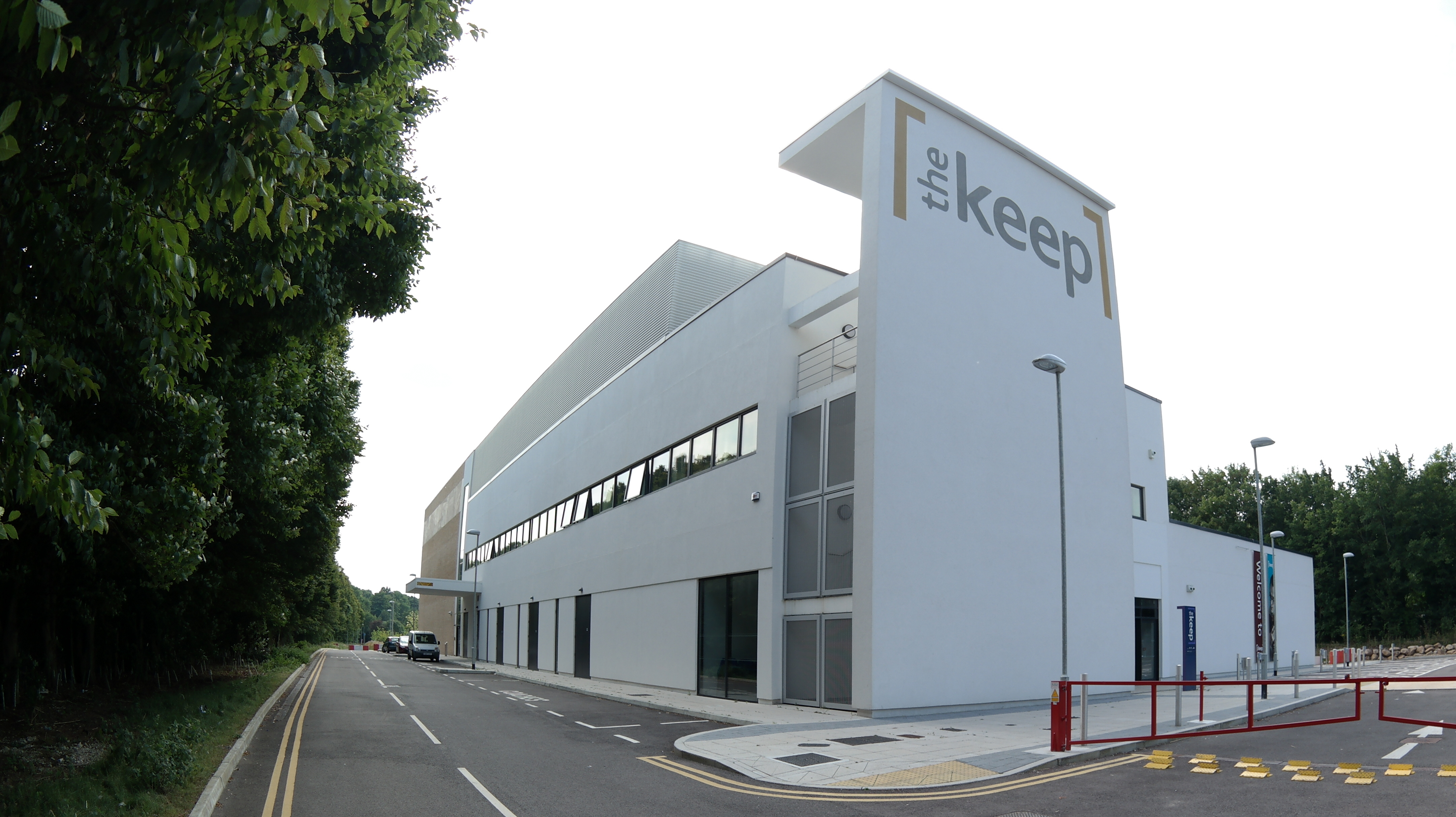
- The finished building in July 2014, seen from the Southeast

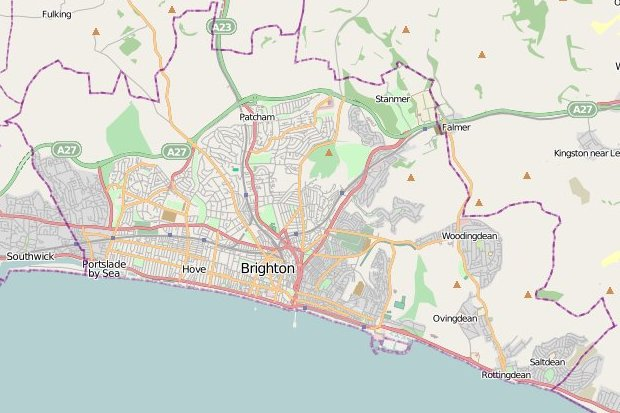
- Location within Brighton & Hove

General information
- Status: Completed
- Type: Archive
- Location: Woollards Way, BRIGHTON BN1 9BP, Brighton and Hove, United Kingdom
- Coordinates: 50.85757°N 0.09829°W
- Groundbreaking: 7 October 2011
- Completed: June 2013
- Opened: 19 November 2013
- Inaugurated: 31 October 2013
- Cost: £19 million
- Owner: East Sussex County Council

Technical details
- Floor count: 3
- Floor area: 5,933 square metres (63,860 sq ft) (main building); 216 square metres (2,330 sq ft) (Energy Centre)

Design and construction
- Architecture firm: Atkins Design Studio
- Civil engineer: Kier Longley

Other information
- Seating capacity: 270

Website
- The Keep home page

The Keep is a purpose-built archive and historical resource centre which stores, conserves and gives the public access to the records of its three managing partners: The East Sussex Record Office, The University of Sussex Special Collections, and Brighton & Hove Museums Local History Collections. The Keep also houses the library and office of the Sussex Family History Group, functions as headquarters of Friends of The Keep Archives, and holds the Historic Environment Record database for East Sussex. From November 2018, it has also functioned as the South East Hub for the Unlocking Our Sound Heritage project for The British Library. It was funded by East Sussex County Council, the City Council of neighbouring Brighton and Hove and the University of Sussex, and was built on land close to the university in the Moulsecoomb area of Brighton and Hove. The building, constructed with a budget of £19 million, opened on 31 October 2013, superseding the former East Sussex Record Office in the county town of Lewes.

== Background ==
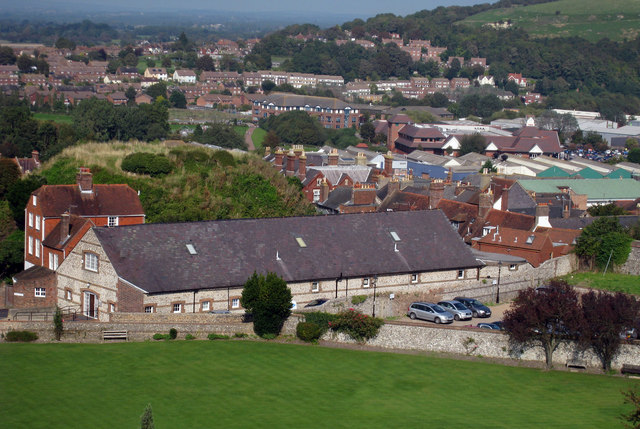
The Maltings in Lewes housed East Sussex County Council's records from 1949.

East Sussex was designated an administrative county in 1865, and in 1889 its county council was formed in accordance with the Local Government Act 1888. In 1949, the council set up its archive and record office in The Maltings in the county town of Lewes; they adapted a Grade II-listed former malt house near the castle. Records, documents and objects up to nine centuries old were stored and displayed, such as a letter to the Abbot of Battle Abbey dating from 1101 and bearing King Henry I's seal. The building had a document repository, conservation laboratory and facilities for the public to examine certain records. Following an inspection in 2003, The National Archives allowed the building to remain in use in the short term as long as a new building was provided; and after another inspection in 2006 it condemned the building as "not fit for purpose" in relation to how it stored paper and parchment documents. If a better facility could not be provided within the county, The National Archives could have arranged for public records to be moved to a suitable building elsewhere in England and stored there—all at East Sussex County Council's expense—while other records would remain in the Lewes building, where conditions would get worse. Suggested alternative locations included the national archive facility at Kew, and newly built archives in Cumbria and Kingston upon Hull. As well as "heavily criticis[ing]" the facility after this second inspection, The National Archives removed most of the licences allowing the county council to store records there.

Although East Sussex County Council had started investigating alternatives in 1996 and undertook a feasibility study in 2004, the project to create a new archive was formalised in April 2006 after the unfavourable second inspection. Between that date and April 2008, several actions were taken: a committee and project manager were appointed, funding was allocated, documentation was produced, Brighton and Hove City Council and the University of Sussex became involved in the process, and a "rigorous site search" was undertaken across the county and the city of Brighton and Hove. Locations at Woodingdean, Newhaven, Lewes, Glynde and two in the Falmer area were examined; one of these was Woollards Field, just inside the Brighton and Hove city boundary on the edge of the Moulsecoomb housing estate. Woollards Field was chosen in May 2007.

== Woollards Field site ==
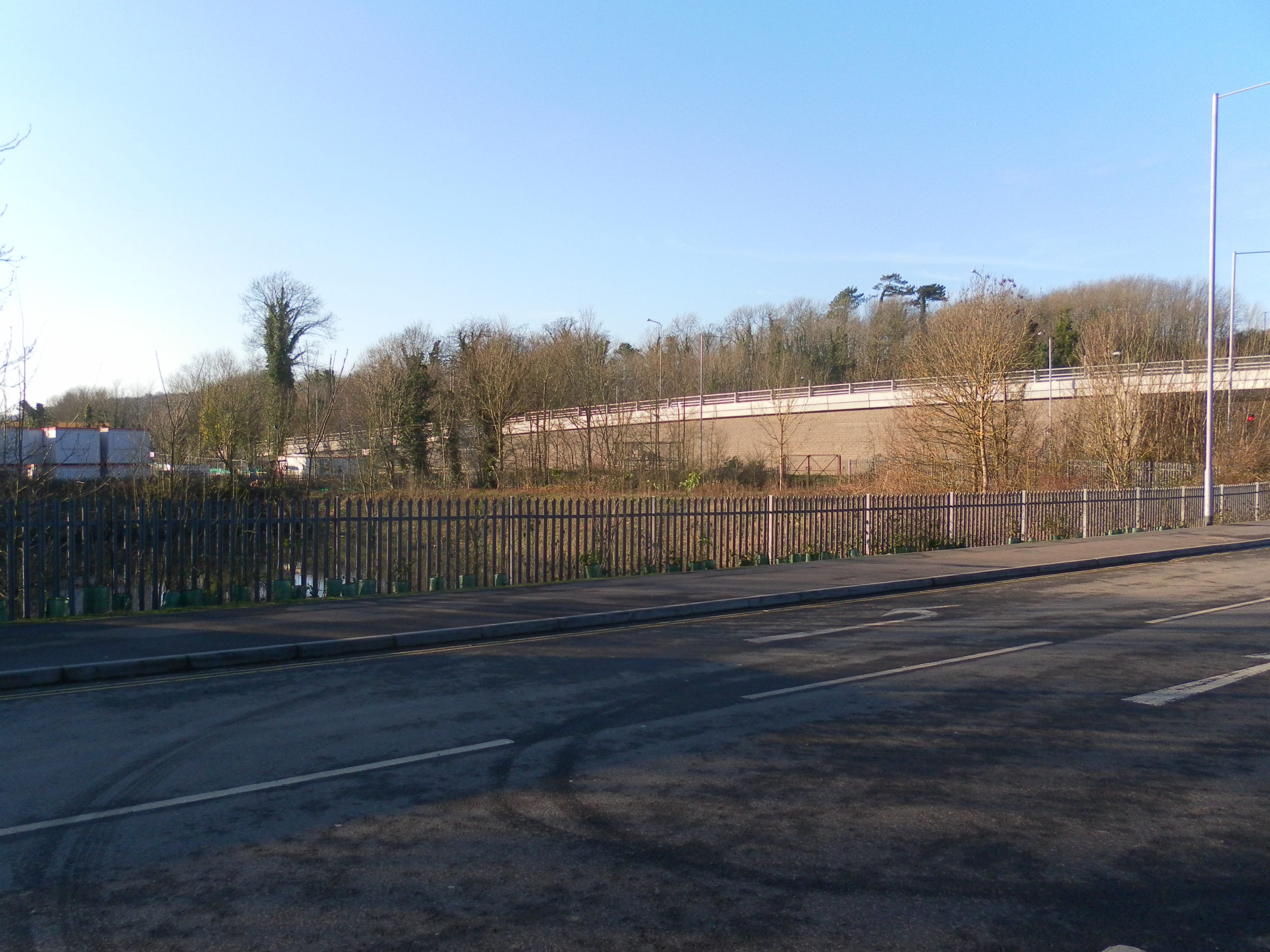
Road access will be via a new road which will join the Brighton Aldridge Community Academy access road (foreground) and lead to the A270 (background).

Woollards Field is an area of open space in the northeast of the city of Brighton and Hove, 5.6 miles (9.0 km) from the city centre. Clockwise from north, it is bounded by the A27 and A270 roads towards Falmer and Lewes, the Brighton Aldridge Community Academy (formerly Falmer High School), a health club, buildings associated with Southern Water and the University of Brighton, the East Coastway railway line, and the Moulsecoomb housing estate. It is owned by East Sussex County Council, and is mostly grass with some trees and shrubs. Until 1990 it was used by local schools for sport and recreation, but the site has been unused since then as it was declared "surplus to requirements". A Tree preservation order for trees on the site was granted in 1974.

The project team selected a 1.98-hectare (4.9-acre) section of the site as the location for the new archive in May 2007. Woollards Field benefited from having outstanding planning permission for development covered by Class B1 of the planning use classes in England. Permission for such development had first been granted in 1993, and various renewals and changes had since taken place.

In March 2010, the contractors and Brighton & Hove City Council discussed whether to retain all the trees on the site. It was agreed to retain half of the existing trees and to plant a new copse at the west end of the site (nearest the Moulsecoomb housing estate), while also reducing the amount of car parking on the site to below the "maximum standard" for a building of its size. The new copse will be part of a 0.525-hectare (1.30-acre) "informal recreation" area which will include some open grassland for public use. Also, in December 2012 it was stated that a community orchard would be created on some of the free land which does not form part of the development area.

Falmer railway station is nearby, and new bus stops have been built on both sides of the A270. Public footpaths and a cycle path will be built through the site to connect it with the Moulsecoomb estate and the adjacent road; this was estimated to cost £33,000. A 69-space car park and 20-space bicycle park have been provided behind the building. Coach parking facilities have been added on the south side.

== Construction ==
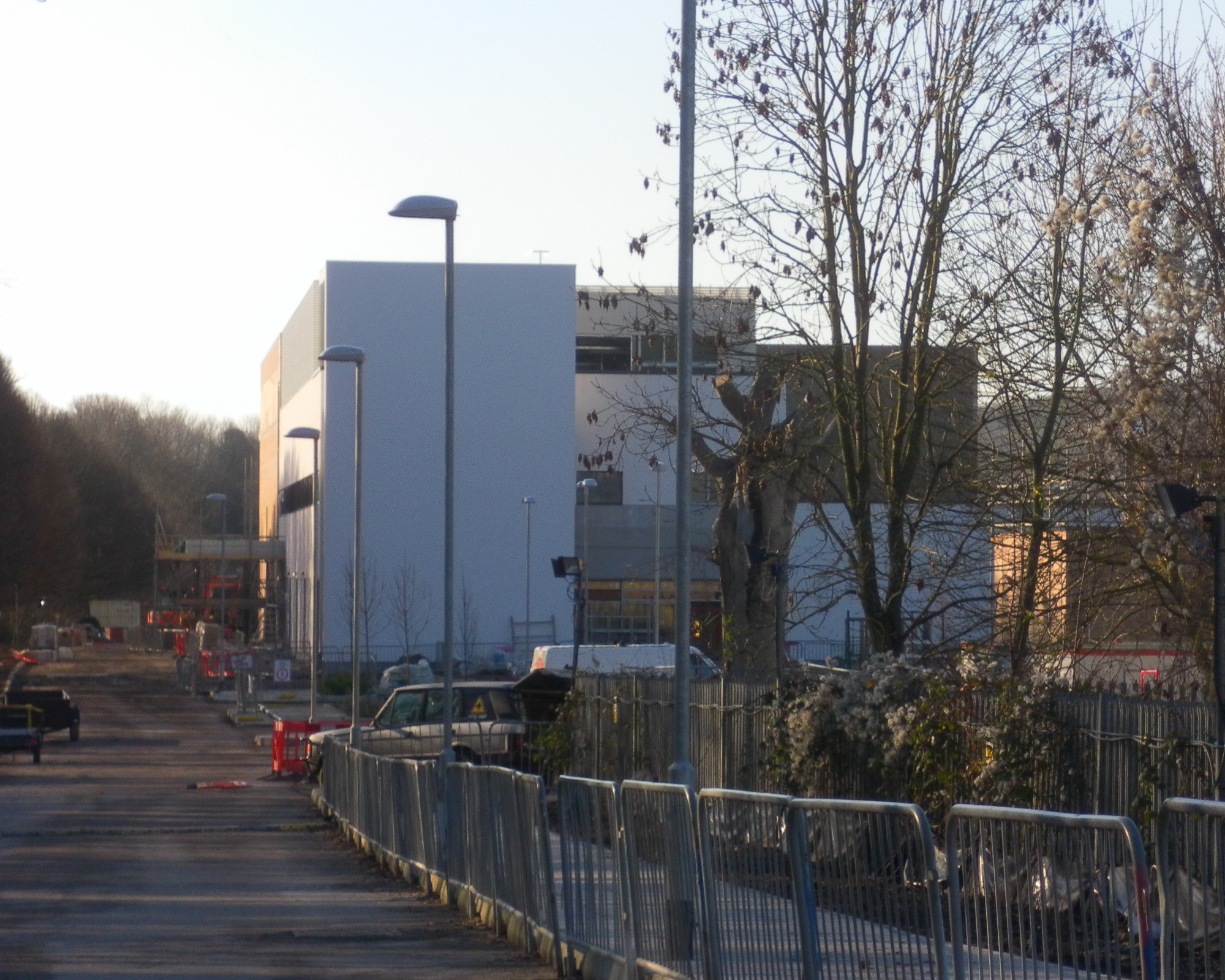
The building stands at the end of a new access road.

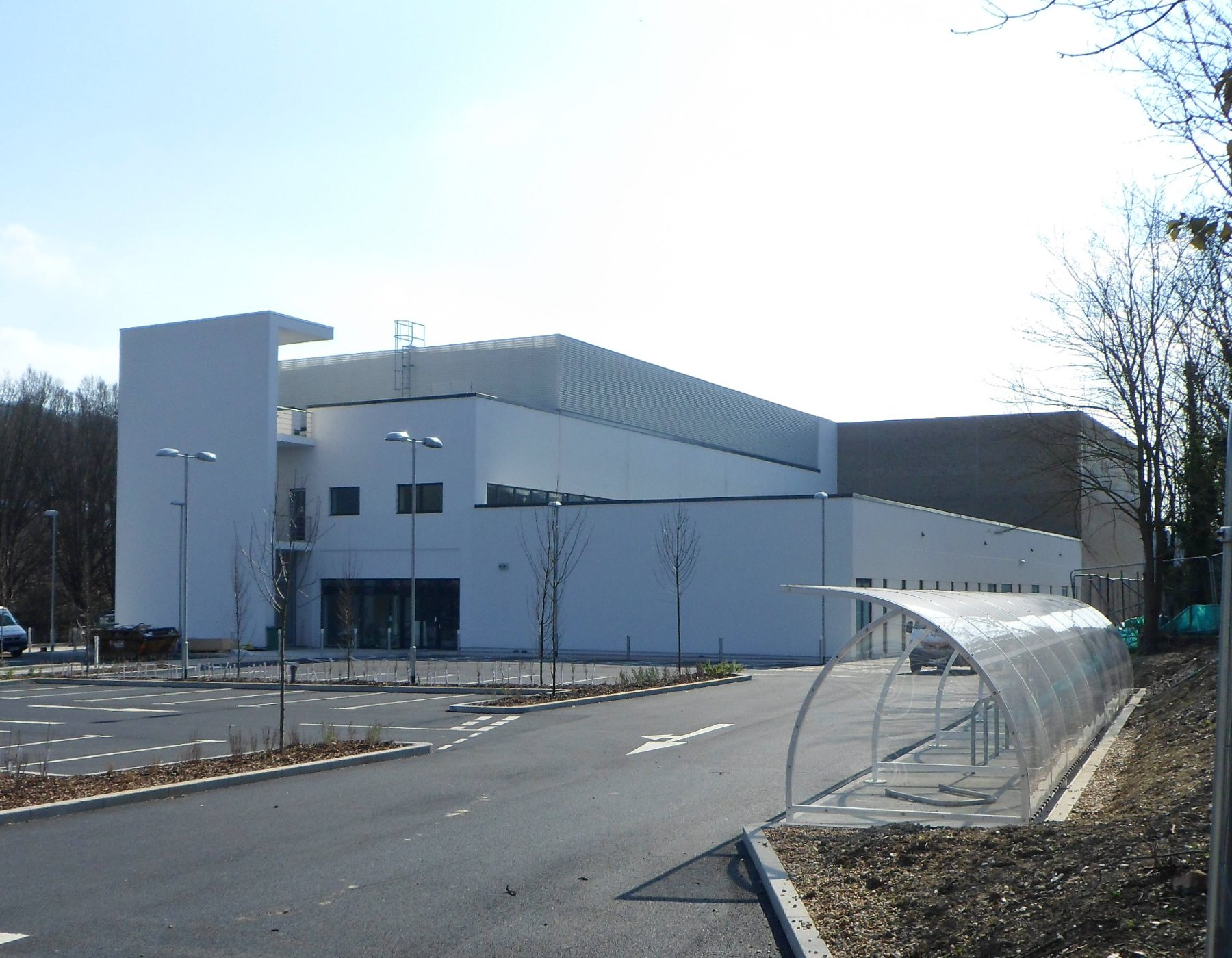
The building under construction in April 2013, seen from the northeast.

East Sussex County Council and Brighton & Hove City Council put the scheme out to competitive tender and commissioned the Kier Southern (Kier Longley) division of Kier Group as its preferred building contractor. Atkins were chosen as the scheme architects; they have been involved in the design of archive facilities since 1991, including the Berkshire Record Office and the Wiltshire and Swindon History Centre. Both were designed with the principle of keeping the archive storage and the public areas separate while maintaining a consistent architectural style, which was also the intention with The Keep. The provisions of BS 5454 (the British Standard consisting of "recommendations for the storage and exhibition of archival documents") and the wishes of The National Archives also influenced the design process. Other companies involved with the design and construction process included GTA Civils Ltd, who undertook transport and flood risk assessments; Lizard Landscape Design, who were involved with environmental analysis such as landscape assessments, ecological planning, arboricultural investigation and site photography; Ashdown Site Investigation Ltd, who carried out site contamination analysis; and Archaeology South East (part of the Institute of Archaeology, University College London), who undertook archaeological investigation at Woollards Field.

The scheme budget was originally set at £23.6 million. The committee sought National Lottery money through a bid to the Heritage Lottery Fund, but this was turned down in December 2008. This created a £4.9 million shortfall, and the budget was later revised to £19 million. A grant received in respect of installing photovoltaic electricity generating equipment subsequently increased the available funds to £19,142,000, of which £17,910,000 was allocated to construction and capital expenditure and the remaining £1,232,000 to other costs such as marketing, planning and payments to professionals. £12 million was provided by East Sussex County Council.

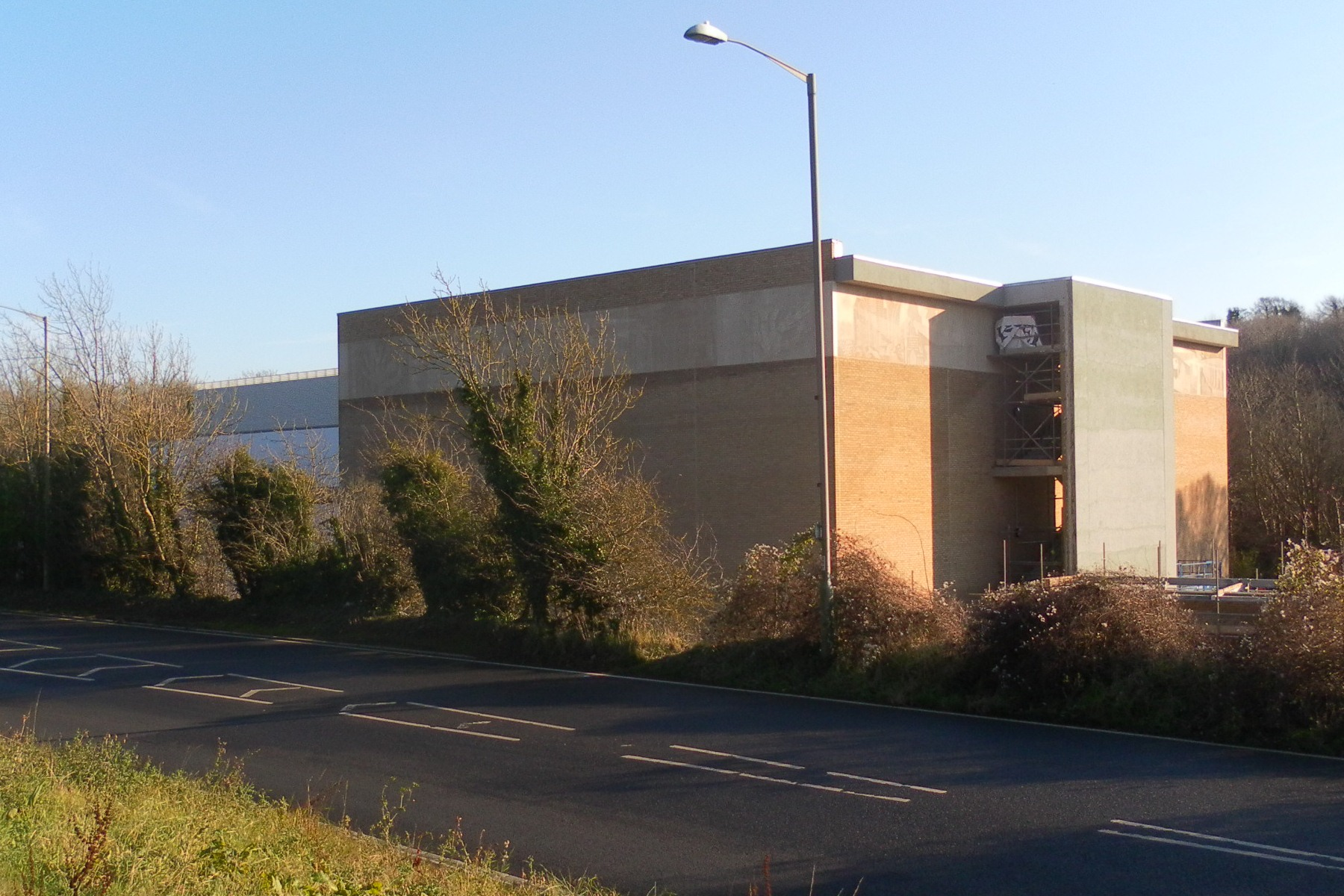
The building (pictured in December 2012) is next to the A270 Lewes Road.

Planning permission for the development was given on 14 January 2011, and construction work started on 7 October 2011 after a turf-cutting ceremony. Just under a year later, on 1 October 2012, the roof was finished and a topping out ceremony took place. At that time, it was stated that the building was expected to be finished at the end of 2013, although East Sussex County Council's timeline anticipated completion in early 2013 and a public opening later in the year. Brighton and Hove City Council stated in March 2013 that the former Brighton History Centre near the Royal Pavilion in the city centre would close on 1 April 2013 to allow about 350,000 items to be transferred to The Keep in time for its public opening. In June 2013, when construction work finished and the building's owners took possession of it, the official opening date was set at November 2013. Queen Elizabeth II performed the official opening on 31 October 2013 during a visit to Sussex.

The building has three storeys and a gross floor area of 5,433 square metres (58,480 sq ft). A separate "Energy Centre" adds another 216 square metres (2,330 sq ft) to The Keep's footprint. The main building is intended to have capacity for 20 years worth of records; a further 14 years worth of capacity could be added with an extension at the southwest side, for which provision has been made in the design. Up to 270 public users and 35 members of staff can accommodated: the maximum capacities of the lecture rooms and reading rooms are 155 and 115 respectively. Architecturally, The Keep is a rectangular structure with pale brickwork and some rendering, metal-framed windows and doors, a silver metal roof with areas of vegetation and wildflowers, and an "embossed concrete frieze" near the roofline to "create additional visual interest and ... break down the mass of the block". The building is 14 metres (46 ft) high, 73 metres (240 ft) long and 32.5 metres (107 ft) wide. The design is said to reflect that of "many educational buildings which have been developed in a similar architectural idiom".

== Remit and facilities ==
The Keep houses all of the archives, documents and historical records of both East Sussex County Council and Brighton & Hove City Council. The University of Sussex's Special Collections are also included, including the records of the "internationally renowned" Mass-Observation project and manuscripts by Rudyard Kipling and Virginia Woolf. The Sussex Family History Group (which covers both East and West Sussex) is based in the building and has its library there.

Facilities are provided for public access and research. Educational visits by schools and other institutions, volunteer groups, societies and similar are catered for. Facilities include lecture rooms, a public reading/study room and similar provision for staff, a recording centre for oral histories, conservation laboratories and areas where archive materials can be repaired, repositories for storage, reprographic and record digitisation facilities, offices, eating and refreshment areas, toilets and a separate Energy Centre.

By generating electricity from photovoltaic panels, turning rainwater into usable water and generating heat from a biomass boiler, this facility will help The Keep meet its aim of being "the most sustainable archive building in the country".

The Keep is open to the public at the following times:

Tuesday – 10am – 4pm

Wednesday – 10am – 4pm

Thursday – 10am – 1pm

Friday – 10am – 4pm

Saturday – 10am – 1pm

Sunday and Monday – Closed

Visiting information, including guides on how to book material in advance of a visit, can be found on The Keep's website.

== See also ==
- History of Brighton
- Mass Observation
- University of Sussex
- West Sussex Record Office

== Bibliography ==
- Allard, Philip; McSweeney, Jessica (October 2010). The Keep – a New Historical Resource Centre for East Sussex and Brighton & Hove. The Keep Archive Centre Planning Statement (Report). Planning Perspectives LLP on behalf of East Sussex County Council and Kier Southern. Archived from the original on 4 September 2012.
- Collins, Sophie (2007). A Sussex Miscellany. Alfriston: Snake River Press. ISBN 978-1-906022-08-2.
