= Northumberland and Durham Family History Society =

- Abbreviation: NDFHS
- Formation: 1975
- Type: NGO
- Registration no.: 510538
- Legal status: Charitable Organization (Education)
- Purpose: to promote interest in family history, genealogy and heraldry; to foster the spirit of mutual co-operation, by sponsoring projects in these fields
- Headquarters: Newcastle upon Tyne
- Location: UK
- Coordinates: 54.9770°N 1.6148°W
- Region served: North-East of England
- Official language: English
- Main organ: NDFHS Board of Trustees
- Affiliations: Family History Federation
- Website: http://www.ndfhs.org.uk/

Northumberland and Durham Family History Society is a family history society that covers Northumberland, Durham, and Tyne and Wear in the North-East of England.

It was created in 1975, and its aims are to "promote interest in family history amongst its members and the general public.

It produces a quarterly Journal, and has a wide range of publications, parish records in particular, for sale.

It is a member of the Family History Federation.
