= Manchester and Lancashire Family History Society =

British charity in Manchester, United Kingdom

- Formation: 1964; 62 years ago
- Type: Genealogical Society
- Registration no.: 515599
- Legal status: Charity
- Headquarters: Manchester, United Kingdom
- Location: Manchester Central Library
- Region served: Greater Manchester, Lancashire
- Official language: English
- Activities: Lectures, Events, Research, Publication
- Journal: The Manchester Genealogist
- Patron: Lord Mayor of Manchester
- President: Vacancy
- Affiliations: Family History Federation
- Website: www.mlfhs.uk

The Manchester and Lancashire Family History Society is an educational registered charity (No. 515599) for the encouragement of ‘the public study of family history, genealogy, heraldry and local history’ and promotion of ‘the preservation, security and accessibility of archival material'. It was founded in 1964 in Manchester and became a registered charity in 1984.

The Society is one of the oldest and largest family history societies in the United Kingdom. It is run by an Executive Committee elected by the Members. The Society, with several branches (Oldham and District, Bolton and District and Anglo-Scottish Ancestry) offer a varied programme of more than 50 meetings every year. The Society is also active in a wide variety of indexing projects relating to local genealogical sources.

Society volunteers provide a free public help desk service each weekday at Manchester Central Library.

The Society’s journal The Manchester Genealogist (ISSN 0143-1331), published quarterly, includes articles on local history, genealogy, other topics of interest, reviews of books as well as up to date information about the latest family history developments.

== See also ==
- Family History Federation
