= Sussex Family History Group =

Sussex genealogical organization

- Formation: 1972
- Legal status: Charitable Organization (Education)
- Headquarters: The Keep, Brighton
- Location: UK
- Members: 2,500
- Official language: English
- Main organ: Sussex Family Historian
- Affiliations: Federation of Family History Societies
- Website: https://sfhg.uk/

Sussex Family History Group (SFHG) is an organisation with a world-wide membership of about 4,000 founded in 1972 to help those interested in researching their family history in East Sussex and West Sussex. The name reflects the fact that historically Sussex was a single county.

SFHG is a member of the Federation of Family History Societies (FFHS) and a supporter of the Sussex Online Parish Clerks (OPC) project.

== Publications ==
The society produces a quarterly magazine Sussex Family Historian for members, containing articles, letters and lists of members' interests and a newsletter, Sussex Links.

SFHG runs an online forum and a comprehensive website with both public and members' areas. The site received the FFHS Best Website Award in 2003-4 and 2007. The Group's Sussex People Index contains 120,000 entries referring to 230,000 people, all from offline verifiable sources.

== Collections ==
The SFHG Headquarters and Library are at The Keep, near Brighton, where one-to-one research support is available, and the Group sells publications in print and digital format concerning a wide range of genealogical topics as well as those specific to Sussex. Indexes and databases maintained by the SFHG include parish resources such as baptisms, marriages and burials, as well as wills, tombstones, occupations, censuses and strays (people associated with Sussex found in other areas).

== Activities ==
The Group holds an annual conference and periodical workshops on specific aspects of family history, as well as regular meetings in various locations in East and West Sussex.

== See also ==
- East Sussex Record Office
- West Sussex Record Office
