= Harold Fanjoy =

Canadian politician

Member of the New Brunswick Legislative Assembly for Kings Centre
- In office 1974–1987
- Preceded by: Riding established
- Succeeded by: Kal Seaman

Personal details
- Born: November 1, 1939 Saint John, New Brunswick, Canada
- Died: April 26, 2008 (aged 68) Saint John, New Brunswick, Canada
- Party: Progressive Conservative
- Relatives: Bruce Fanjoy (nephew)
- Education: New Brunswick Institute of Technology

Harold Newton Fanjoy (November 1, 1939 – April 26, 2008) was a Canadian businessman and politician. He represented Kings Centre in the Legislative Assembly of New Brunswick as a Progressive Conservative from 1974 to 1987.

== Biography ==
Fanjoy was born in Saint John, New Brunswick, Canada the son of I. Newton and Muriel G. Seely, and was educated there and at the New Brunswick Institute of Technology. Fanjoy served as Minister of Supply and Services from 1976 to 1982 and was president of the province's Treasury Board, serving in the cabinet of Premier Richard Hatfield. He lost his seat to Kal Seaman in the 1987 election, which saw not only the defeat of the Progressive Conservative government but a clean sweep of the province's seats for the Liberals. Fanjoy was a former president of the New Brunswick Genealogical Society and was co-author of The Seelys of New Brunswick, published in 1992. He married Marilyn Bishop and had two sons.

Fanjoy's nephew, Bruce Fanjoy, is a Liberal Party of Canada MP for Carleton. He was elected in the 2025 federal election, defeating Conservative Party of Canada leader Pierre Poilievre.
