= Upper Dales Family History Group =

Founded in October 2000, the Upper Dales Family History Group (UDFHG) is a family history society that covers Swaledale, Arkengarthdale and Wensleydale, in North Yorkshire, and their tributary valleys.

The UDFHG aims to support those members whose ancestors had their roots in Wensleydale and Swaledale (within the Yorkshire Dales).

== Meetings ==
The group supports an extremely active member-only e-mail forum, which includes correspondents from all parts of the world as well as local members. It also produces and sells the "Bishopdale Booklets" which consist largely of copies of Census returns from 1841 to 1901 from many of the villages and towns in the Upper Dales.
