= Whittier Mansion =

Historic house in San Francisco, California, US

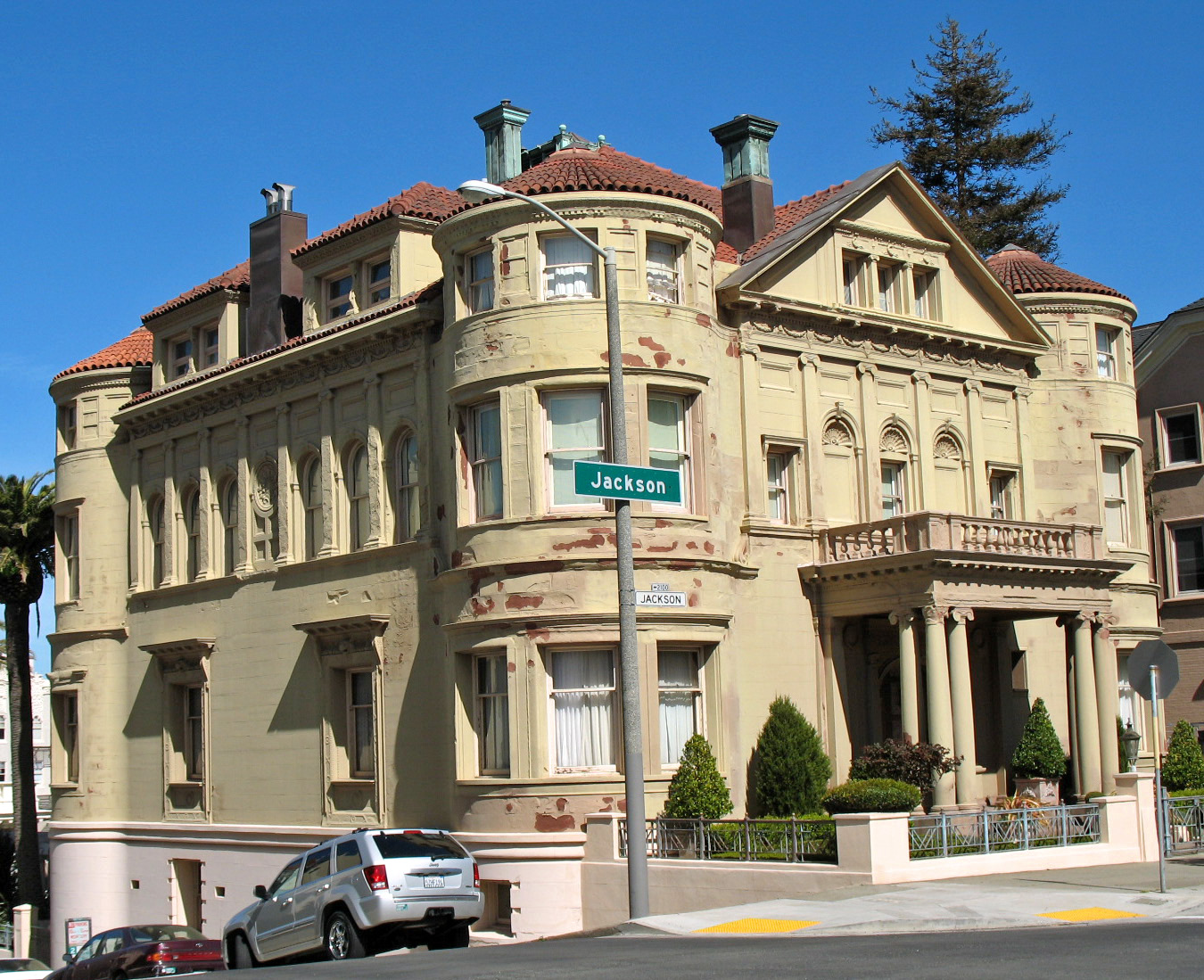
- Whittier Mansion (present day)

- Location within San Francisco Location within California Location within the United States

General information
- Location: 2090 Jackson Street, San Francisco, California, United States
- Coordinates: 37.793415°N 122.429428°W
- Completed: 1896

Design and construction
- Architect: Edward Robinson Swain

Other information
- Number of rooms: 30
- Whittier Mansion
- U.S. National Register of Historic Places
- San Francisco Designated Landmark
- Built: 1896
- NRHP reference No.: 76000524
- SFDL No.: 75

Significant dates
- Added to NRHP: April 26, 1976
- Designated SFDL: November 8, 1975

Whittier Mansion is a historic building that has served as a private residence, was the West Coast headquarters of the Nazi Party, and was formerly occupied by the California Historical Society. It is located at 2090 Jackson Street in the Pacific Heights neighborhood of San Francisco, California. The mansion is one of few buildings to survive the 1906 Earthquake. It is purported to be haunted.

It is listed on the National Register of Historic Places since 1976, and is a San Francisco Designated Landmark (no. 75) since 1975.

== Background and construction ==
=== William Franklin Whittier ===
William Franklin Whittier (1832–1917), built the mansion in 1896 as a private residence for him and his children. Whittier was born in Vienna, Maine, and travelled to San Francisco (via the Isthmus of Panama) in 1854. After arriving in San Francisco, Whittier formed several business ventures and at one point his firm was "the major west coast paint and white lead manufacturer, with extremely profitable side-lines in imported glass, mirrors, oils, etc."

Through buyouts, mergers, and acquisitions, as well as the death of two business partners—Caleb Cameron by accidental drowning in 1862, and William Parmer Fuller in 1890—Whittier came to own the business along with W.P. Fuller (William Palmer Fuller's son.)

=== Sale of firm to Fuller Family ===
W. Frank and Young W.P. (as W. Frank called him) did not get along, and after much mutual dissatisfaction, W. Frank offered to buy the business from Young W.P. However the Palmer family felt the offer was a too low, and made a counter offer to buy the firm from W. Frank.

The Fuller family countered, and in 1893, three years after William Palmer Fuller's death, W. Frank accepted their offer to buy the firm for $400,000 ($14 million in 2025 dollars). The buyout was to be paid in 32 monthly installments.

Without a firm to run, W. Frank decided to build a grand mansion for his family to live in. He had a son, and two daughters, however his wife was tragically killed by a runaway horse and carriage accident in 1885.

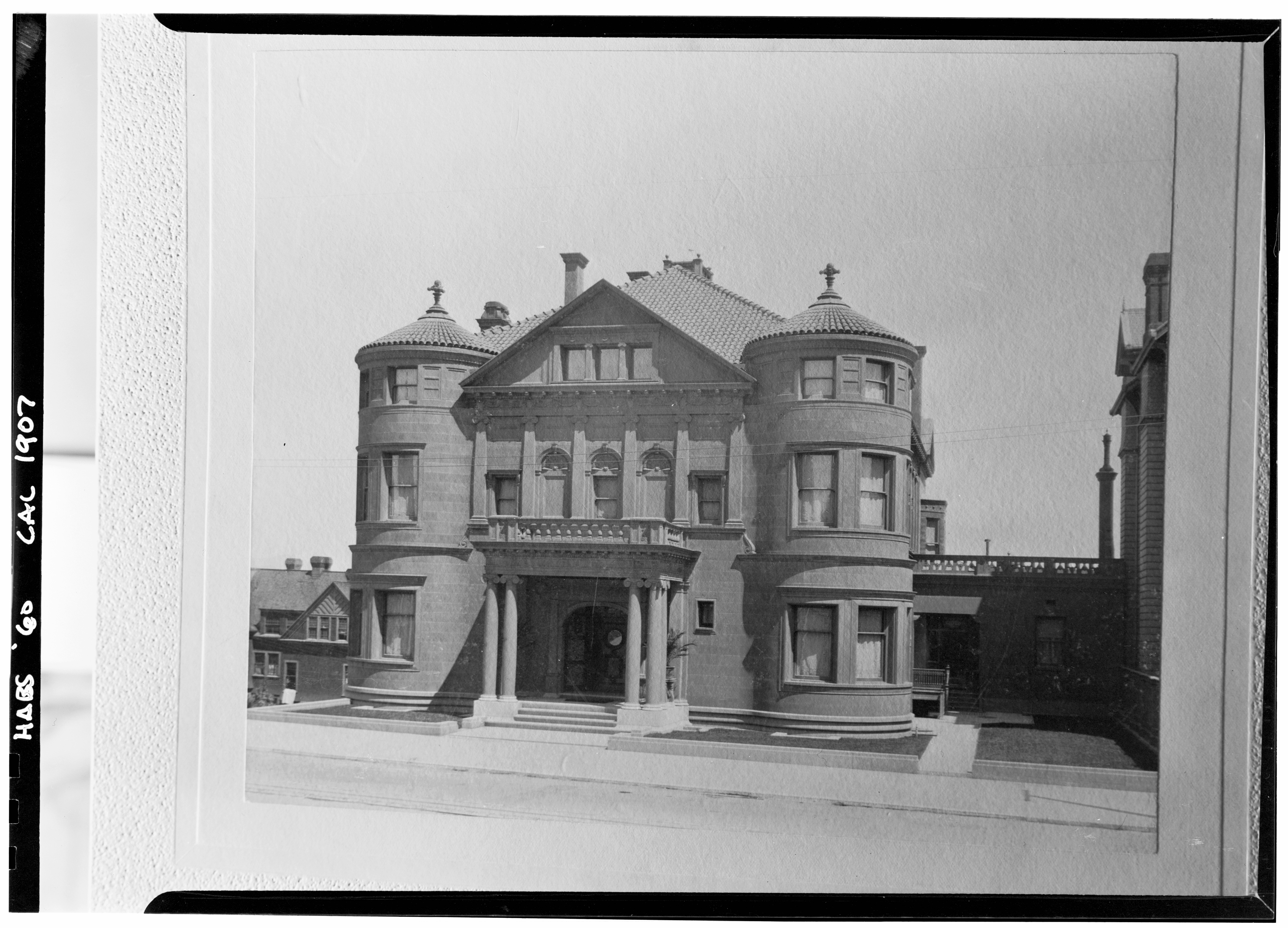
Whittier Mansion seen in 1910

=== Construction ===
The Whittier Mansion cost $152,000 ($5.7 million in 2025 dollars) to build and furnish, with W. Frank using the monthly payments from the sale of his firm to pay for it. Construction on the mansion began in 1894, and took two years to build and furnish. The Whittier's finally occupied the mansion in August 1896.

=== Mr. and Mrs. William Boyd Weir ===
W. Frank moved to the town of Hemet, in Riverside County, California and as such, the mansion was occupied by W. Frank's youngest daughter, Mattie Weir née Whittier, and son-in-law, William Boyd Weir, though their primary residence was in Menlo Park. Following W. Frank's death in 1917, Mrs. Weir became the owner of the Whittier Mansion. However, she did not occupy the home and rented it to various tenants, including William Dargie, who founded the Oakland Tribune. One of those tenants was Frederick "Fritz" Wiedemann, who may have moved into the mansion as early as 1939.

== German Reich ==
=== Transaction and move ===
On April 12, 1941, during the rise of Nazi Germany in the German Reich, Mrs. Weir temporarily transferred the property to The California Pacific Title and Trust Company, who subsequently transferred the title to Herman Loeper on April 28, 1941. On April 29, 1941 Loeper transferred the mansion's title to the German Reich. The Nazi Consulate paid $44,000 for the mansion, all cash.

The complex process by which the title changed hands was to ensure secrecy, The San Francisco Chronicle reported at the time. The Chronicle went on to report that Charles M. Dufficy, real estate agent for Mrs. Weir, contacted the Nazi Consulate to enquire if they were interested in the mansion as a new location. Fritz Wiedemann revealed to the Chronicle that in order to hide their part in the transaction, they opted to use their own real estate agent, Kurt Huber, as they knew that if their plans were known the sale may not go through. As a result, Dufficy announced he would sue for his commission as he felt he was pushed out.

Prior to the move into 2090 Jackson St., the Nazi consulate was at 26 O'Farrell street; after a fracas wherein a Nazi Flag was flown outside the consulate's window and a number of WWI veterans scaled the building to tear it down, the building's owner cancelled their lease. Prior to the move, Wiedemann oversaw alterations to the mansion by Brass & Kuhn of 1919 Bryant St. at a cost approximately $900 ($19,700 in 2025).

=== Function and use ===
The Nazi consulate moved into the mansion, which served as the consulate for the Nazi Regime until July 15, 1941 when the United States Government kicked German diplomats out of the United States.

While on Jackson St., Wiedemann, who served "as chief of the Nazi propaganda and espionage services in the United States," used the Whittier Mansion to conduct "clandestine business for the Nazis - attempting to intimidate German-Americans into 'serving the party'." Meanwhile, Loeper Served as the Chancellor of the consulate, while it remained in operation.

The Consulate in the Whittier Mansion served as the headquarters for West Coast Nazi Espionage, and as a "clearing house for German code documents and other diplomatic mail sent from Berlin to Nazi Consulates and agents in both North and South America."

From the Whittier mansion, Wiedemann also coordinated activities of the German-American Bund, as well as the secret storage of large amounts of ammunition, centered in New Jersey, which the German-American Bund was to use to fight against the United States Government if the time came to do so. Both Wiedemann and Loeper were accused by the United States Commissioner Head of conspiring to violate foreign agent laws.

=== Local reaction ===
Upon learning of the planned move, neighbors were reported to be upset about the Nazi consulate moving into the neighborhood; they hired attorney Marvin Lewis to appeal the move in front of the San Francisco Planning Commission. In reply, Wiedemann asserted that the United States Department of State had assured him they could use the property.

Lewis appeared before the planning commission to make the case of neighbors; he subsequently appeared in front of the commission twice more after no decision was reached. The City of San Francisco never rendered a decision, as the State Department "demanded that the Nazis close all consular, news and information agencies in this country." Despite a deadline of July 10, the Nazi Consulate closed on July 15, 1941.

== Subsequent ownership ==
After the consular officials from Nazi Germany were removed from the United States, the mansion stood empty. Captain Fred C. Mensing, a naturalized American Citizen, served as its caretaker.

On September 24, 1947 the mansion was seized and held by the Office of Alien Property Custodian. before it was eventually transferred to the United States Attorney General, and sold at auction in 1950 at which point it became a private residence, once again.

The status as a residence, however, would be short lived, as the mansion was occupied by the California Historical Society from 1956 to 1991.

== Design ==
Designed by architect Edward Robinson Swain and built in 1896 by the family of financier William Franklin Whittier, it contains 30 rooms. Construction included steel-reinforced brick walls and a facing of Arizona red sandstone. The mansion was built with one of the first residential elevators in San Francisco. The elevator was installed in March 1895 by Cahill and Hall Elevator Company, at a cost of $1,225 ($47,408 in 2025).

The mansion contains a built-in steel vault, which the Weir family used to safeguard their silver. The Nazi consulate expanded and fortified the vault, adding an alarm system to safeguard their records.
