= California Historical Society =

U.S. state of California's state historical society

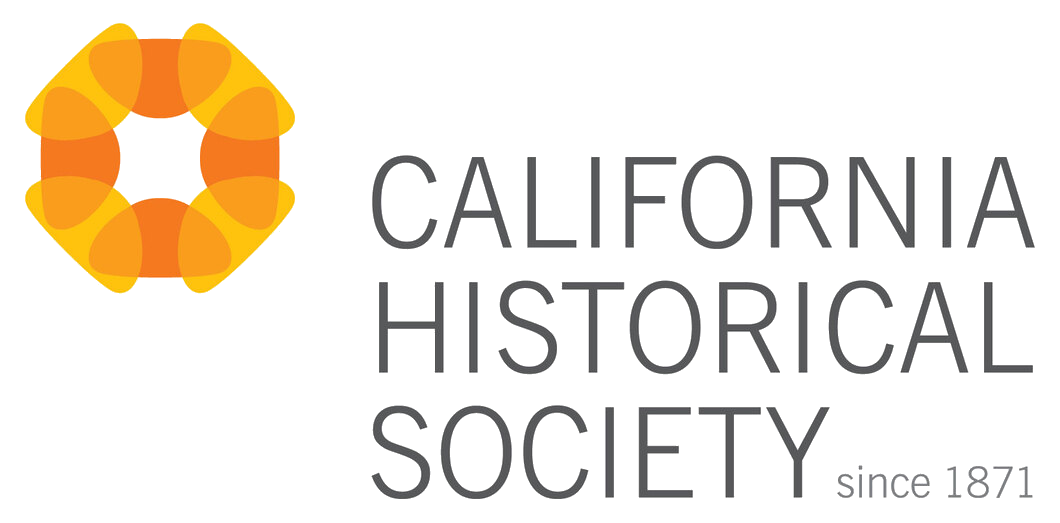
- Abbreviation: CHS
- Established: 1871
- Founded at: Santa Clara, California
- Dissolved: 2025
- Legal status: Official historical society of California
- Headquarters: San Francisco, California
- Coordinates: 37°47′12.64″N 122°24′5.33″W
- Interim CEO: Jen Whitley
- Chief Operating Officer: Jen Whitley
- Publication: California History
- Website: Official website

The California Historical Society (CHS) was the official historical society of California, until it dissolved and transferred its collections to the Stanford University Libraries in an agreement that was announced in January 2025. Founded in 1871 by a group of prominent Californian intellectuals at Santa Clara University, the Society was designated as the California state historical society in 1979. Although the Society was based in San Francisco, it hosted exhibits across California.

== History ==
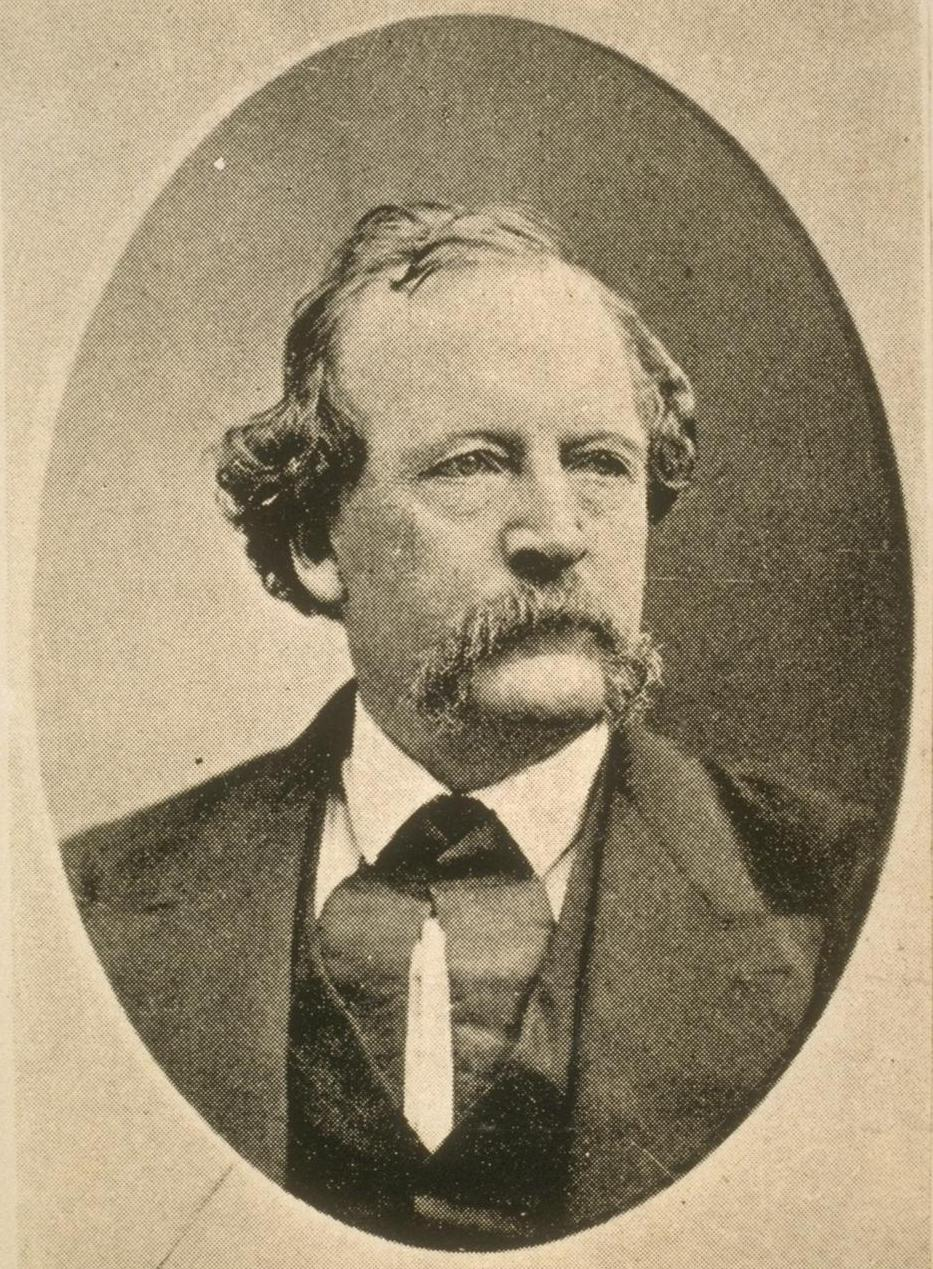
John W. Dwinelle led a group of prominent Californian intellectuals in founding the society at Santa Clara University in June 1871.

The California Historical Society was founded in June 1871 by a group of prominent Californian politicians and professors at the Santa Clara University (then the College of Santa Clara), led by Californian Assemblyman John W. Dwinelle (an influential founder of the University of California). The stated mission of the society was “collecting and bringing to light and publishing, from time to time, all information not generally accessible on the subject of the early colonization and settlement of the west coast of America, and especially Northwestern Mexico, California, and Oregon. The society published 32 papers until 1901. From 1901 to 1906, the CHS temporarily merged with the California Genealogical Society. Following the devastation of the 1906 San Francisco earthquake, the society fell into dormancy until 1922.

In 1922, the society was permanently reestablished by Templeton Crocker, famed expeditionary of the California Academy of Sciences. In 1979 the organization was named the official state historical society, in a bill signed by Governor Jerry Brown.

The Society maintained a collection of historical documents, photographs, art and other research materials, awarded the annual California Historical Society Book Prize, and published California History, an academic journal, in association with the University of California Press. It occasionally hosted C-SPAN lectures on California history. Exhibitions included a 2015 celebration at the Palace of Fine Arts of the centenary of the Panama–Pacific International Exposition, and the Society sponsored the 50th anniversary celebration of the Summer of Love in 2017.

The Society hired Alicia Goehring as executive director and CEO in September 2019, after Anthea Hartig became director of the National Museum of American History. Following Goehring's death in August 2022, the Society named COO Jen Whitley as its interim CEO.

To reduce costs, the Society sold its San Francisco headquarters in 2024 and reduced its employees from 30 to seven and then three. In January 2025 it announced it was closing down and that Stanford University would acquire its collections, which will become the California History Collection at Stanford, administered in association with the Bill Lane Center for the American West and Stanford University Libraries.

=== Locations ===
Headquarters of the CHS throughout history

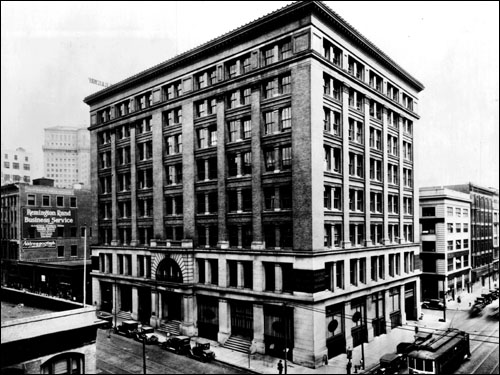
Wells Fargo Building, 1922–38

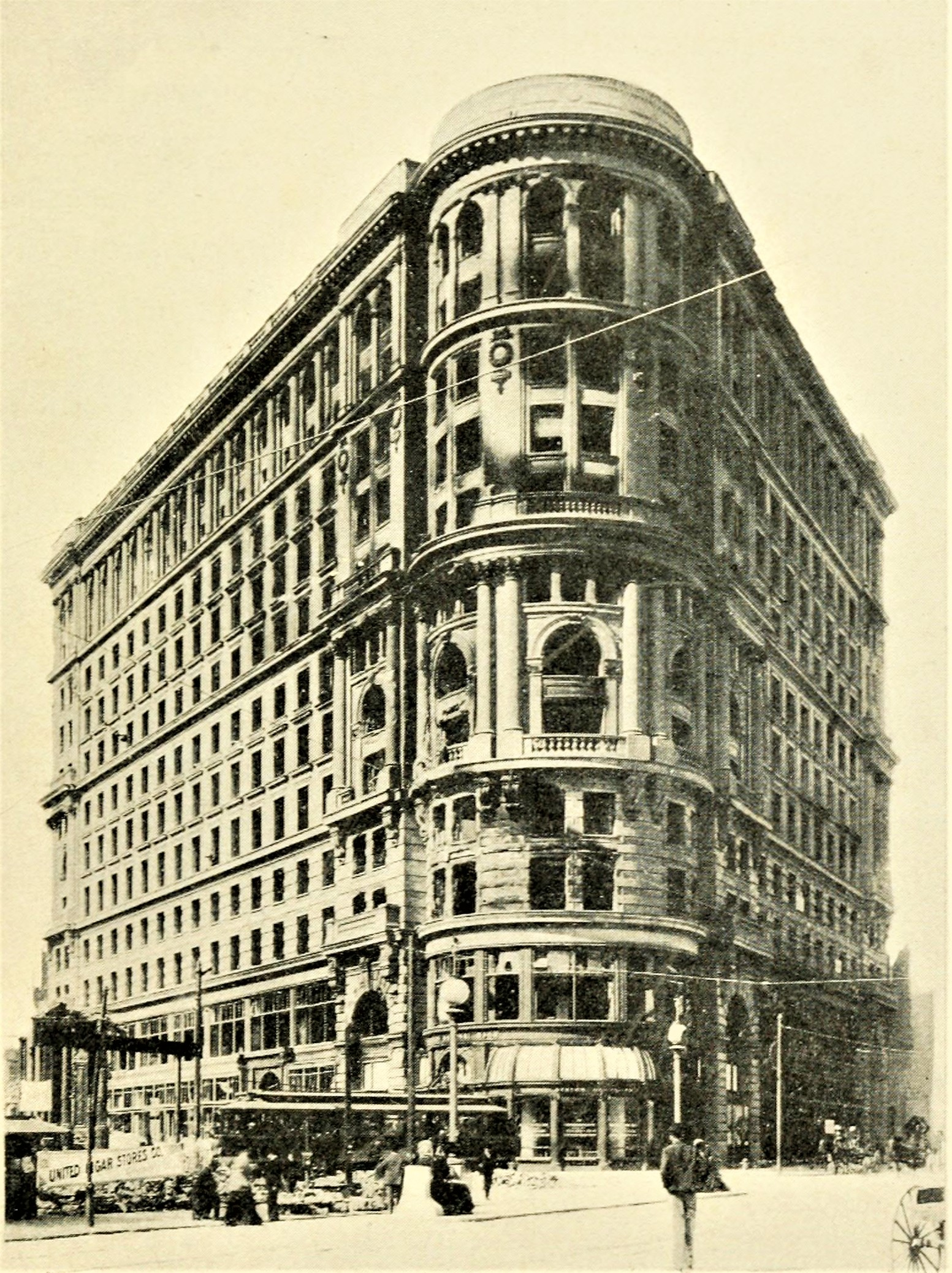
Flood Building, 1955

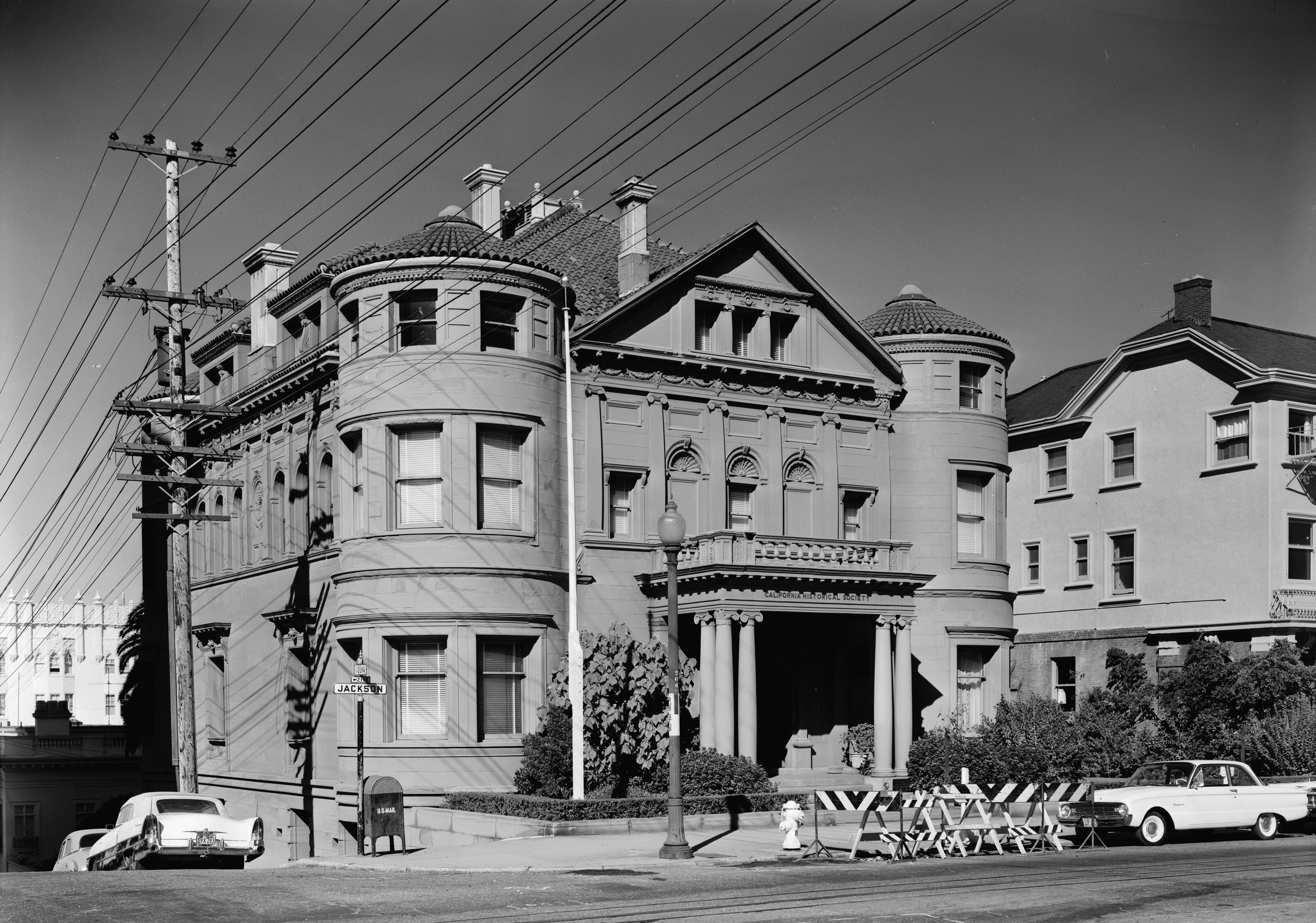
Whittier Mansion, 1956–95

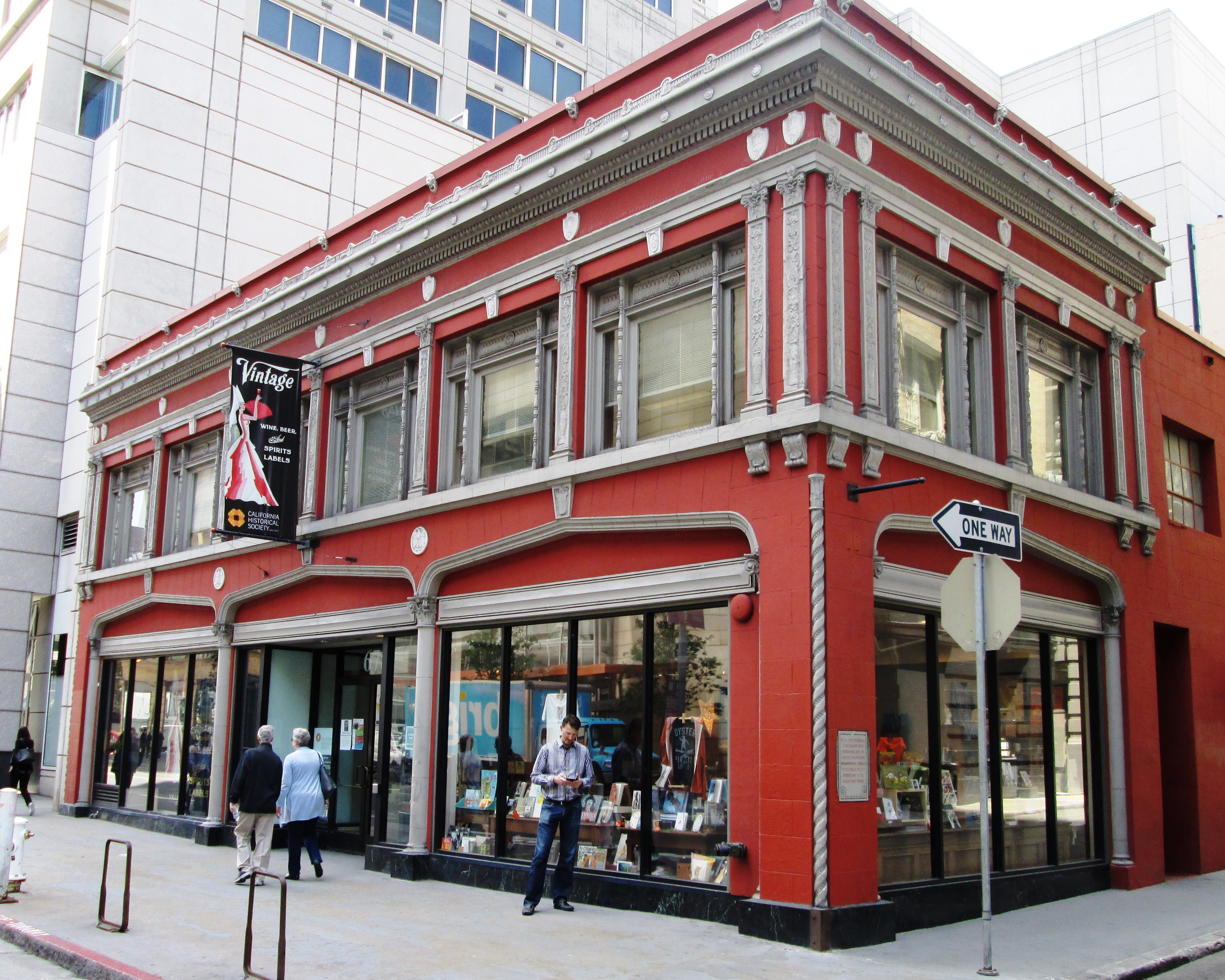
Builders Exchange, 1995–2024

Shortly after its refounding in 1922, the Society leased Room 508 of the Wells Fargo Building (at Second and Mission) as its headquarters. Subsequently, the Society moved its offices to 456 McAllister (sharing the Pioneer Hall building near City Hall with the Society of California Pioneers) in 1938 and the Flood Building as a temporary home in 1955 when the Pioneer society was expanding.

The society bought the Whittier Mansion in Pacific Heights as its headquarters in 1956, subsequently adding an adjacent building. In 1993, under director J.S. Holliday, it sold both and bought the San Francisco Builders Exchange Building at 678 Mission Street, which had housed E. M. Hundley Hardware and served as headquarters for Nancy Pelosi's first campaign for Congress. The building was gutted and rehabilitated, and the Society moved there in 1995. In 2012, when the Golden Gate Bridge was 75 years old, the Society had its facade painted international orange, the color of the bridge.

For several years the Society studied the feasibility of moving to the Old San Francisco Mint building, which would be renovated to house a museum and a community center. Although the society has hosted educational events as well as exhibitions at its San Francisco headquarters, in July 2020 the society announced that it was putting that building up for sale to reduce costs, and that it planned to house its research library and store its collection in dispersed locations and organize touring exhibitions to appear at venues including local historical societies throughout the state. In June 2024, the 20,000-square-foot headquarters building was sold for nearly $6.7 million, to the San Francisco Baking Institute.

== Collections ==
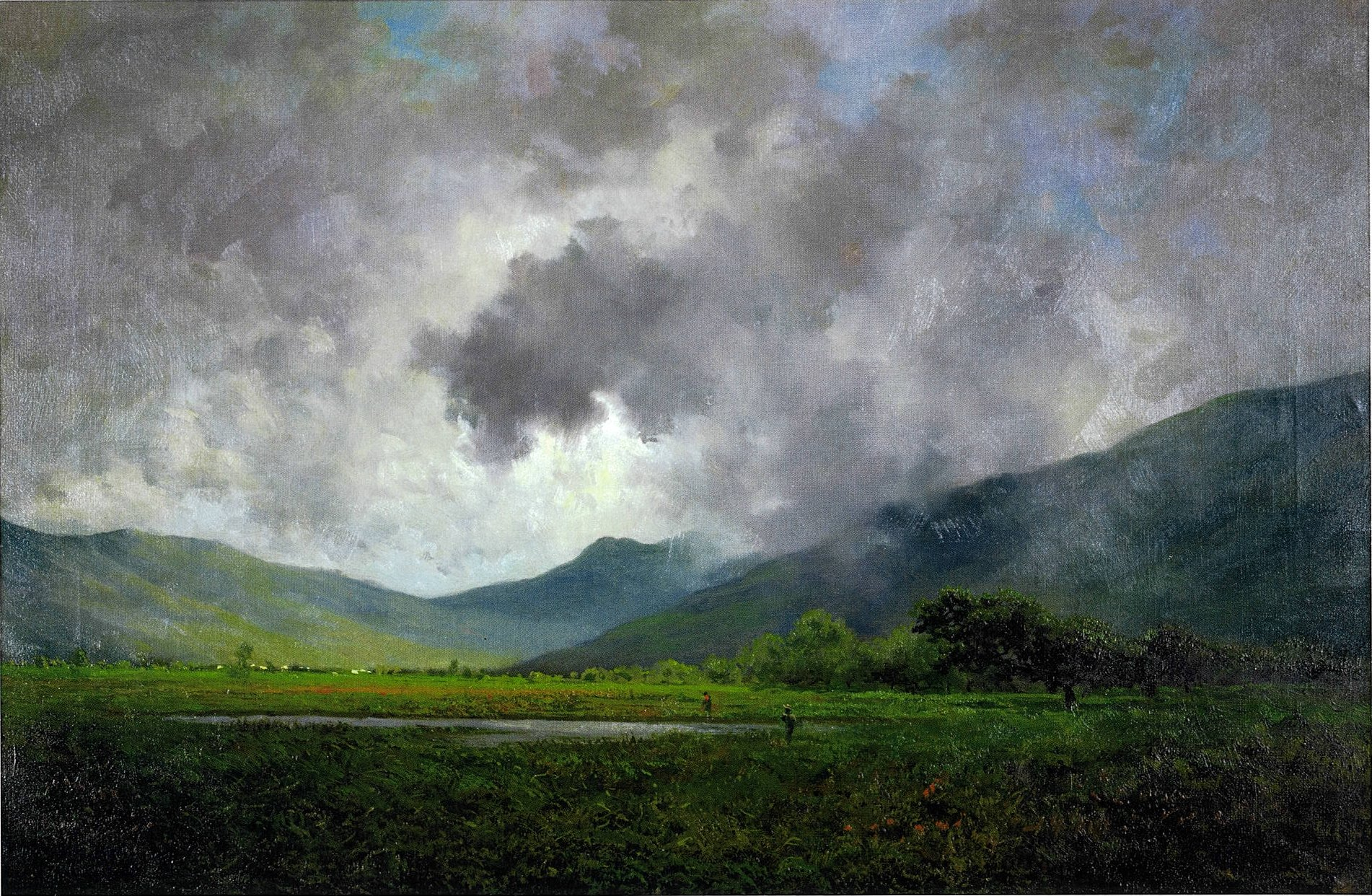
April Showers in Napa Valley; oil on canves by Jules Tavernier, c. 1880.

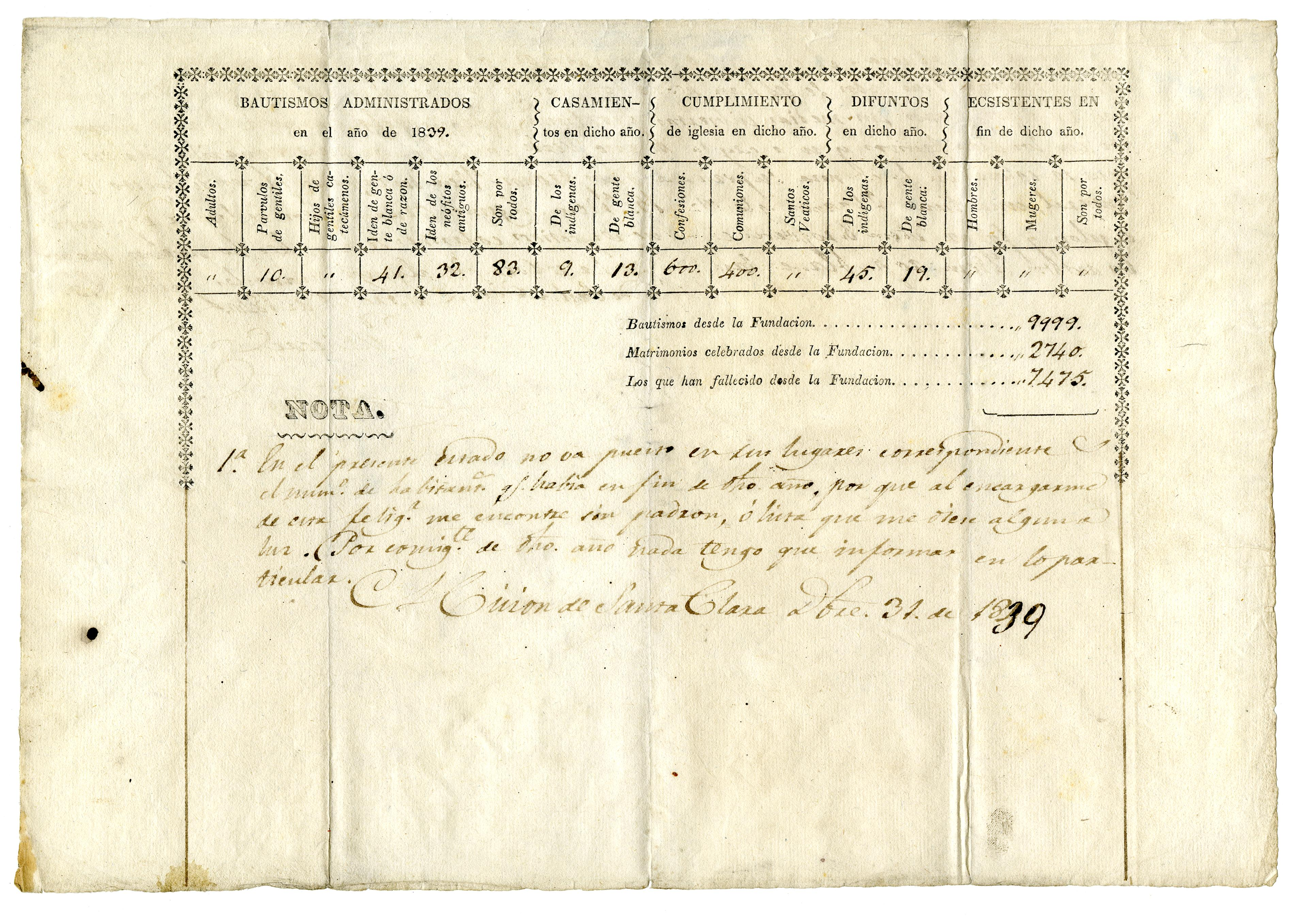
Mission Santa Clara de Asís baptismal records from 1839; manuscripts collection.

According to the Society, its "Collection represents the environmental, economic, social, political, and cultural heritage of the entire state of California, including materials from outside California that contribute to a greater understanding of the state and its people. The collection includes 50,000 volumes of books and pamphlets; 4,000 manuscript collections; 500,000 photographs; printed ephemera, periodicals, posters, broadsides, maps, and newspapers; the Kemble Collection on Western Printing and Publishing; 5,000 works of art, including paintings, drawings, and lithographs; and numerous artifacts and costumes.

=== Fine Art Collection ===
The Historical Society houses an outstanding collection of over 5,000 works of art, including paintings, drawings, and lithographs. Artists represented in the Fine Art Collection include Albert Bierstadt, Maynard Dixon, George Albert Frost, William Hahn, Thomas Hill, Grace Carpenter Hudson, William Keith, Arthur Frank Mathews, and Theodore Wores.

=== Manuscripts Collection ===
The Historical Society holds the papers of noteworthy organizations and businesses, including those of the American Civil Liberties Union of Northern California, League of Women Voters, California Tomorrow, Stern Grove Festival Association, Peoples Temple, and the Heller Ehrman law firm. The Society also holds the papers of influential persons, including the Burr-Allyne Family, San Francisco Mayor James Rolph Jr, Asbury Harpending, and Isaias W. Hellman.

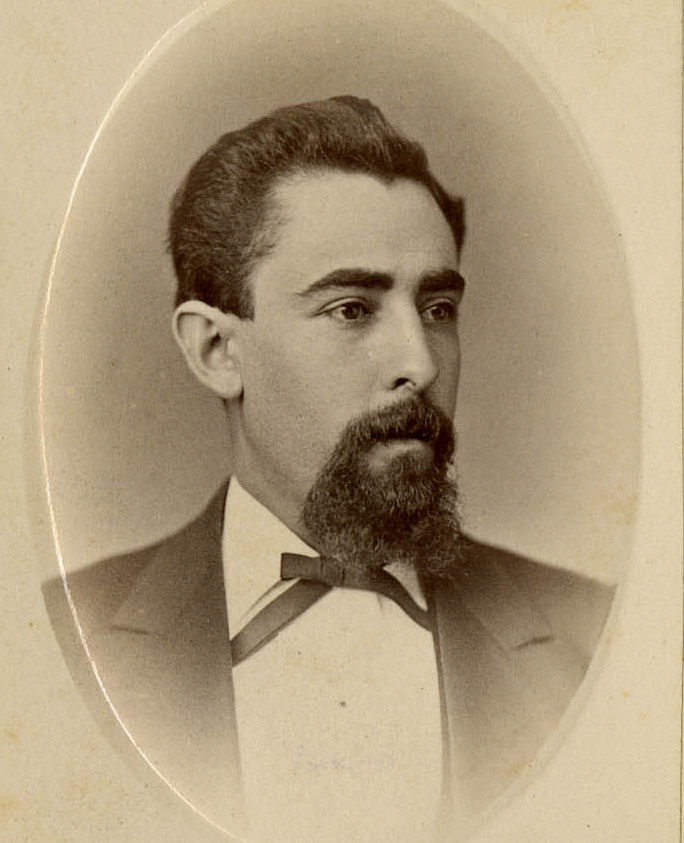
Photograph of Reginaldo Francisco del Valle from the Californios collection, c. 1878.

=== Ephemera Collection ===
The ephemera collection consists of a wide range of ephemera pertaining to the state of California and each of its constituent counties.

Dating from 1841 the collection includes ephemera created by or related to churches; civic associations and activist groups; clubs and societies, especially fraternal organizations; labor unions; auditoriums and theaters; historic buildings, landmarks, and museums; hotels and resorts; festivals and fairs; sporting events; hospitals, sanatoriums, prisons, and orphanages; schools, colleges, and universities; government agencies; elections, ballot measures, and political parties; infrastructure and transit systems; geographic features; and other subjects.

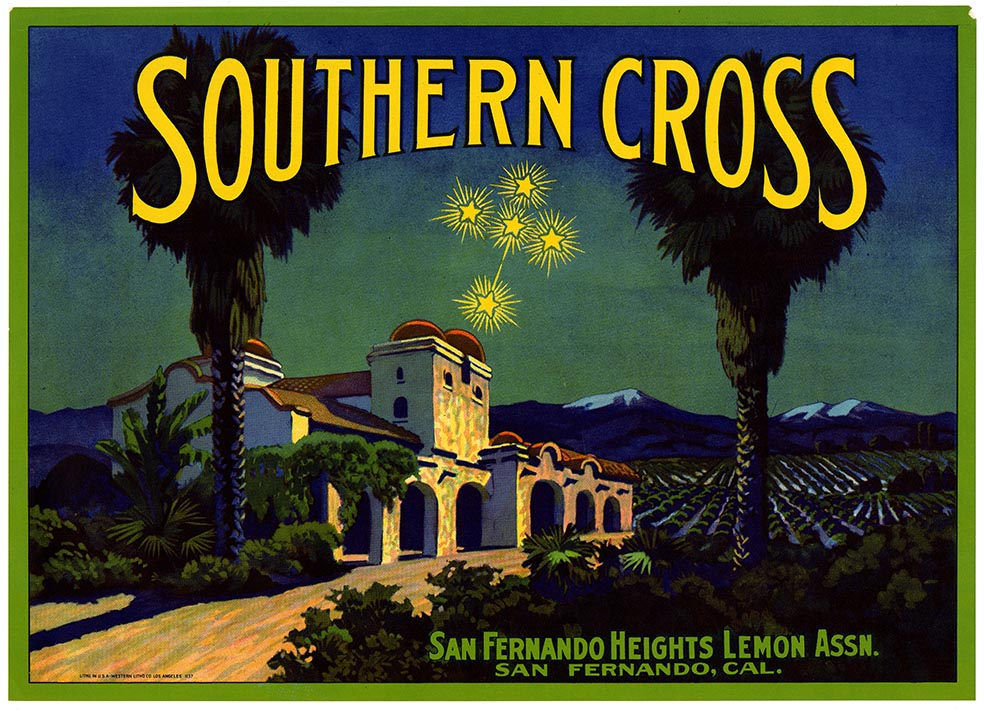
Label for Southern Cross lemons from 1937; ephemera collection.

In 1964, former Society president, printing historian, and collector George L. Harding founded the Kemble Collection on Western Printing and Publishing, named in honor of pioneer California printer and publisher Edward Cleveland Kemble. Dedicated to the history of printing and publishing in the West, this collection began with three major gifts—Harding's printing and publishing library, William E. Loy's typographical library, and the business archives of San Francisco printing firm Taylor & Taylor—and has since grown in size and scope.

=== Photography Collection ===
The Historical Society holds documentary and fine art photographs by photographers such as Marliese Gabrielson, Arnold Genthe, Louis Herman Heller, Eadweard Muybridge, Anton Wagner, Carleton Watkins, Minor White and Willard Worden.

== California Historical Society Book Award ==
In 2015, the California Historical Society (CHS) and Heyday Books established the California Historical Society Book Award.

== See also ==
- List of historical societies in California
- History of California
- List of museums in San Francisco
