= Carnegie Heritage Centre =

Grade II listed building in Hull, England

Coordinates: 53.7441°N 0.3725°W

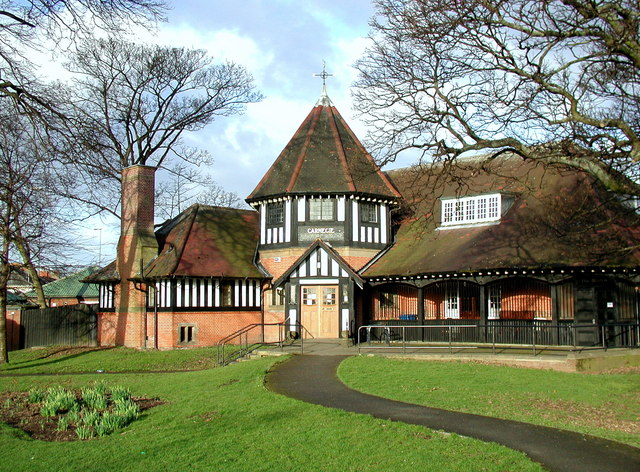
The Carnegie Heritage Centre

The Carnegie Heritage Centre is a grade II listed building in Hull, England, which was designed as a Carnegie library.

Originally known as the Carnegie Free Library, the building opened in 1905 as Hull's fifth branch library. Andrew Carnegie donated £3,000 towards its construction. It is situated at the gates of West Park, and is unusual among Carnegie libraries for its half-timbered construction (although not unique, there is a similar building in Stratford-upon-Avon).

It was used as a public library until 2003. Library services were then provided in a Learning Centre within the adjacent KC Stadium, and the former library had various uses and was then left empty. The Carnegie Heritage Action Team was created in 2006 to rescue the building and create a centre for local and family history resources. The centre opened in August 2008, and is now run by the Carnegie Heritage Centre ltd. The centre received material from the local history collections of Hull College when the college's local history unit closed down, and the East Yorkshire Family History Society rents space in the centre to house its research material. A bindery operates from the premises, and a variety of local history events take place including WEA courses in local history.
