= New Brunswick Genealogical Society =

The New Brunswick Genealogical Society (NBGS) is a nonprofit organization founded in 1978 and dedicated to historical genealogical research in New Brunswick, Canada. It publishes the Generations genealogical journal and the New Brunswick Vital Statistics from Newspapers. NBGS host genealogical and history fairs in the local area.

== History ==
NBGS was founded in November 1978, during a meeting of local genealogists.

The society began publishing its journal, Generations, in June 1979.

Harold Fanjoy once served as president of the Saint John chapter of NBGS. He died in 2008.

== Activities ==
In 2006, NBGS released First Families, a collection of records relating to the first 7,414 families to arrive in New Brunswick. The material is held at the Provincial Archives of New Brunswick and was made available online. The records have not been updated since 2006, and are considered a "finding aid" only.

In 2018, NBGS launched a project aimed at digitizing over 600 Anglican registers dating back to the 1790s.

Since 2019, NBGS has received government funding as a participant in the Canada Summer Jobs program.

In 2025, NBGS partnered with the Provincial Archives of New Brunswick (PANB) and Association of New Brunswick Cemeteries (ANBC) to launch the NB Cemetery Records Project. The project seeks to preserve cemetery records by creating a digital catalogue of existing records and where they are stored, as well as by providing archival storage for records deemed to be at risk.

In 2026, NBGS reported a large increase in the number of Americans signing up to the Society to access members-only family records with the aim of acquiring Canadian citizenship. This was accompanied by a similar increase in requests sent to the Provincial Archives of New Brunswick from Americans. CNN tied the increased interest to dissatisfaction with the United States under Donald Trump, and CBC highlighted Canada's passing of a law in November 2025 that expanded access to Canadian citizenship as a major impetus.
