= Genealogical Society of South Africa =

Genealogical society in South Africa

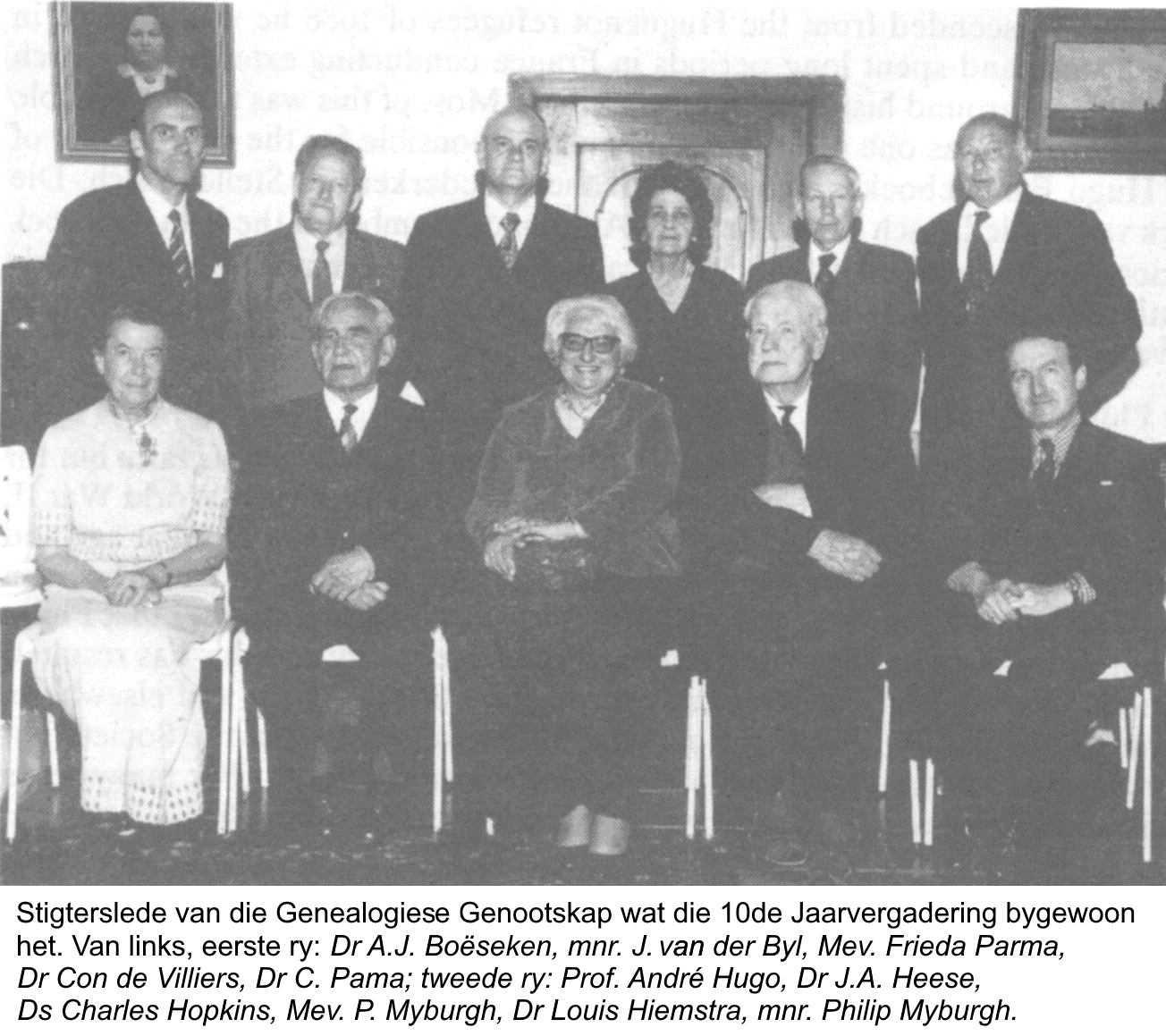
Founding members of the Genealogical Society of South Africa at the 10th Annual Meeting on 8 October 1974 in Joostenberg.

The Genealogical Society of South Africa is a family history society. The society consists of 11 regional branches as well as an electronic branch accessible online.

The society maintains a large archive of Genealogical material related to Southern African families.

== History ==
The Genealogical Society of South Africa (GSSA) was founded on 18 June 1964 with the inspiration of Philip Myburgh, a keen genealogist. Mr. Myburgh invited eight others with similar or allied interests to partake in the traditional hospitality of his farm Joostenberg, Muldersvlei on the outskirts of Stellenbosch, to discuss the setting up of a body devoted to the study of genealogical and family research in general.

After its establishment in 1964 the National Council of the Society was domiciled in Stellenbosch and the quarterly journal Familia was regularly published in Cape Town. The Society has since grown to just under 1000 members with 12 branches based across the country.

GSSA is the home of the South African Family Registers. The Society took ownership of the records when the Genealogical Institute of South Africa (GISA) closed its doors in 2018.

The GSSA receives a substantial number of enquiries about family histories and individuals from around the world.

GSSA is a non-profit organization.

== Mission ==
To promote and facilitate interest and research in genealogy and family history to present members.

== Objectives ==
- To promote and facilitate interest in, and a general understanding of, the importance of research in genealogy and family history among members of the Society, other interested people, and the general public;
- To provide a wide range of meetings, educational courses, projects and services about genealogy and family history for the general benefit of members of the Society, and other people;
- To encourage the observance of the highest standards of research by members of the Society, and to promote reliability, integrity and professionalism of all South African genealogists;
- To be actively involved in the preservation of genealogical records and memorabilia; and
- To establish and maintain contact with like-minded societies throughout the world.

== Structure ==
=== National Council ===
The National Council consists of the National Executive Committee (NEC) and two delegates of each branch.

=== National Executive Council ===
The NEC is elected at the Annual General Meeting and consists of the National President, National Vice-president, National Secretary, National Treasurer, additional members and co-opted members to perform specific actions e.g. public relations and product development.

The NEC meets regularly and are responsible for the day-to-day administration of the Society.

=== Branches ===
The GSSA branches are at the core of the GSSA where most of the genealogical activities take place. All paid-up branch members elect branch executive committees at the branch AGM. Branches are fully responsible for their own management, including financial and member administration, but they are not separate legal bodies.

==== Branch Executive Committees (BEC) ====
Branches are at liberty to organise the branch in any way they choose to best achieve their goals. The minimum office bearers required are the chairperson, Vice-chairperson, Secretary and Treasurer.

==== Regional Branches ====
The GSSA consists of the National Executive Council (NEC) and 11 branches:

- East Cape (Port Elizabeth)
- Free State (Bloemfontein)
- Johannesburg (Randfontein)
- Natal Midlands (Pietermaritzburg)
- Northern Transvaal (Pretoria)
- North West (Potchefstroom)
- Southern Cape (George)
- Vaal Triangle (Vanderbijlpark)
- West Gauteng (Roodepoort)
- Western Cape (Cape Town)
- eGSSA (the electronic branch with members worldwide).

== See also ==
- Genealogical Institute of South Africa
