= Santa Fe High School =

Santa Fe High School may refer to:

- Santa Fe High School (California), in Santa Fe Springs, California, U.S.
- Santa Fe High School (Florida), in Alachua, Florida, U.S.
- Santa Fe High School (New Mexico), in Santa Fe, New Mexico, U.S.
- Santa Fe High School (Texas), in the Santa Fe Independent School District, Santa Fe, Texas, U.S.
  - 2018 Santa Fe High School shooting
  - Santa Fe Independent School District
- Edmond Santa Fe High School, in Edmond, Oklahoma, U.S.

== See also ==
- Santa Fe Catholic High School, in Lakeland, Florida, U.S.
- Santa Fe Indian School, Santa Fe, New Mexico, U.S.
- Santa Fe Public Schools, Santa Fe, New Mexico, U.S.
