= East Surrey Learning Partnership =

Educational organisation formed by Caterham School

- Formation: 2018
- Founder: Caterham School
- Website: caterhamschool.co.uk

The East Surrey Learning Partnership (ESLP) is an educational organisation formed by Caterham School that aims to improve primary state school education within East Surrey through collaboration.

== Formation ==
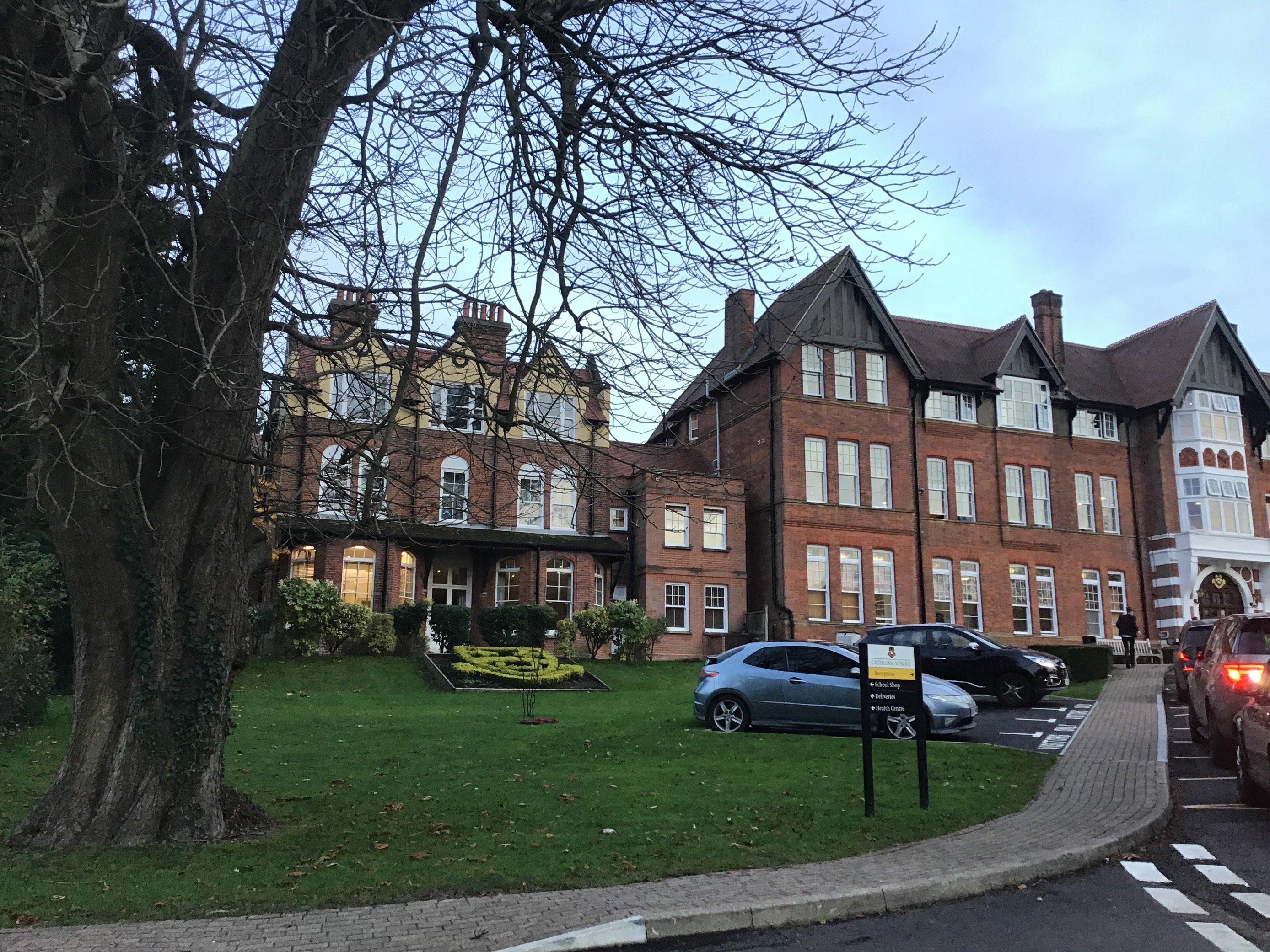
Caterham (Old School and Headmaster's Garden)

The ESLP was formed in 2018 by Caterham, a public school in Surrey. Ceri W. Jones, the Headmaster of Caterham, said that the cross-sector partnership was designed to "break the mould of the traditional outreach work of independent schools" by ensuring that each school has "equal standing and representation."
