= Suffolk Family History Society =

Organization based in Suffolk

- Formation: 1975
- Founded at: Suffolk, England
- Type: genealogical association
- Purpose: To promote and encourage the public study of British family history, genealogy, heraldry and local history with particular reference to Suffolk
- Location: Suffolk, England
- Website: www.suffolkfhs.co.uk

The Suffolk Family History Society is a genealogical association in Suffolk, England. It was founded in 1975.

== Background ==
It is a registered charity and a member of the Federation of Family History Societies. It has several local groups meeting in communities throughout Suffolk, and it publishes a quarterly Suffolk family history journal, Suffolk Roots. An Interest group also meets in the West of London.

The Society has 2200 members world-wide.

== Mission ==
The Society seeks "to promote and encourage the public study of British family history, genealogy, heraldry and local history with particular reference to Suffolk; and to promote the preservation, security and accessibility of archival material."
