= Surrey (disambiguation) =

Surrey is a county in South East England.

Surrey may also refer to:

== Places ==
=== Australia ===
- Surry Hills, New South Wales
- Surrey Hills, Victoria

=== Canada ===
- Surrey, British Columbia

=== Jamaica ===
- Surrey, Jamaica

=== United Kingdom ===
- Surrey (European Parliament constituency), 1979-1984
- Surrey (UK Parliament constituency), 1290–1832

=== United States ===
- Surrey, North Dakota
- Surrey Township, Michigan

== Other ==
- Surrey (carriage), a four-wheeled open carriage often with a canopy
- Surrey bike, a quadracycle for tourist rental
- Surrey County Cricket Club in Surrey, England
- University of Surrey in Surrey, England
- Surrey Park, a sports complex in Invercargill, New Zealand
- Surry (1811 ship), a convict ship also commonly called the Surrey
- HMS Surrey, a planned County-class heavy cruiser, ordered in 1929 but cancelled in 1930
- Earl of Surrey, an English title
  - Henry Howard, Earl of Surrey, an English Renaissance poet
