= East Surrey Family History Society =

The East Surrey Family History Society is a genealogical association in Surrey, England. It was founded in 1977 and, while it has an interest in all of the county of Surrey, it has particular interest in the parishes in the eastern part of the ancient county of Surrey. This includes several modern day London boroughs – Croydon, Kingston upon Thames, Lambeth, Merton, Richmond, Southwark, Sutton and Wandsworth.

It is a registered charity and an active member of the Federation of Family History Societies.

The Society aims to promote and encourage the public study of family history, genealogy, and local history with particular reference to Surrey. It also works to preserve, transcribe and publish historical records throughout East Surrey. This includes improving the security and accessibility of archival material. Notably the Local Studies Centre in Sutton Library has received, and continues to receive, practical help and computing resources for work it could not otherwise afford. Similarly the Surrey History Centre in Woking, which is run by Surrey County Council, receives assistance for essential conservation projects.

With about 1000 members worldwide, the Society has several local groups meeting in communities throughout East Surrey, and it publishes a family history journal every four months. It also has a website (www.eastsurreyfhs.org.uk) and a Facebook page that is kept up to date with all the latest news. The Society's Advice & Research Centre in Lingfield offers friendly and helpful advice on researching your own family history and help in trying to break down the brick walls that everyone has in their research. The centre can be contacted via the Society's website.
