= Borders Family History Society =

Scottish border historical society

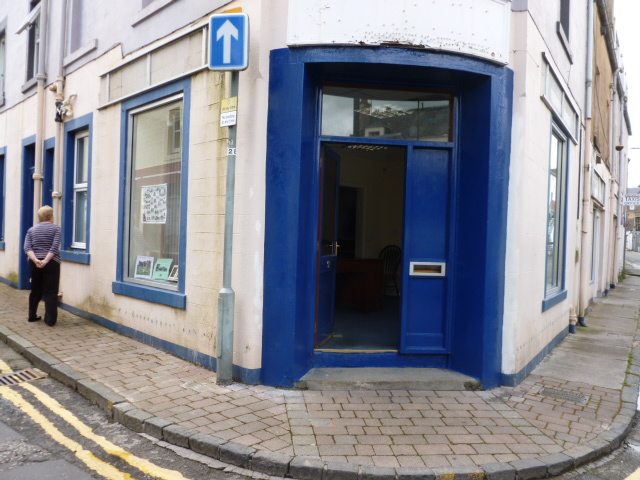
Main Entrance

Borders Family History Society, (BFHS), founded in 1985, is a members and research society which concentrates on the Scottish Borders region in south-eastern Scotland, comprising the ancient pre-1975 counties of Roxburghshire, Berwickshire, Selkirkshire and Peeblesshire, as well as small parts of the former counties of Midlothian (formerly Edinburghshire), and adjacent counties in England. They have map diagrams of the counties and their parishes.

The Society's Patron is the Earl of Lauderdale, who is also the Hereditary Flag-Bearer for Scotland and Chief of the Clan Maitland.

== Headquarters ==
Their premises are at 52 Overhaugh St, Galashiels, TD1 1 DP, Scotland. The premises contain an extensive library of books, microfiche, microfilms, CDs, family trees, and magazines from some other family history societies - catalogues of which are on their website. There is also an archive and search room, and a study room. There is disabled access. Opening hours vary and are shown on the website.

Enquirers can carry out research in the Society's premises or request them to do research for you. The Society encourages family historians to further their genealogical research by recording Surname Interests (free), viewing others' Queries and Surname Interests (currently 7,900 interests recorded - covering about 2,650 surnames), searching the indexes to their publications: the Gravestones Index covering over 5,170 distinct surnames, the Magazine Article Index with over 1,500 different topics, the Family Trees Index (an index to family trees / pedigree charts) with over 4,100 distinct surnames, on their website.

== Events & Meetings ==
For 8 months of the year starting in September they hold monthly Sunday afternoon lecture meetings in Galashiels, a central point in their 'constituency', and occasionally other places in the Scottish Borders, and admission is free; please see details of the lectures and other events.

To celebrate their silver jubilee they held a Family and Local History Fair and Conference on 9 October 2010 in Melrose, and there were talks by well-known local speakers.

The Society were the hosts for the Scottish Association of Family History Societies family history conference and history fair held in Galashiels, Scotland in May 2013. There were 160 genealogical delegates and more than 330 people all told visited the fair. The theme was "Migration" and there were five talks from internationally well-known speakers. The research room was exceedingly busy all day, and there were queues at many of the other advice stalls. The conference and history fair received widespread praise from delegates and thanks from exhibitors. Details of the next Scottish Association of Family History Societies family history conference and history fair.

== Transcribing Records ==
The Society record monumental/gravestone/tombstone inscriptions, and research local social history, publishing the results in books and CDs; they also market other relevant genealogical publications.

A team of Society volunteers have transcribed and indexed digitised Poor Law records for various Borders parishes for the period 1845 to 1933. These records are about applications for poor relief made by people who were settled in a Borders parish, but not necessarily living there, and provide unique information about the applicants, their families and their life; thus it could help you track down a person’s previous or subsequent address if they moved away from their birth parish. Similarly, they’ll also be of interest to people whose ancestors were not born in the Borders but may have lived or died in the Borders. Details included in the index to the Poor Law Records comprise names, place of birth, age or date of birth, address, other family members, description of disablement, date of death, and there’s more information on the images themselves, including occupation, benefit received.

To search for a name see their Poor Law Records Index, for more details, see the Borders Poor Law Records volumes they've published.

A team of volunteers are actively transcribing and indexing digitised police and criminal records for various Borders parishes for the 19th century.

== Magazine ==
Members receive the 44 page Borders Family History Society Magazine three times a year, and the Society's elected Officers and governing Council members appear on the back cover. Members also receive discounts on the society's monumental inscriptions volumes, research service as well as free access to GEDCOM family trees by email. You can become a member by joining online.

The Society currently has over 870 members worldwide and is a member of the Scottish Association of Family History Societies.

== Website ==
- Borders Family History Society
