= Georgie Day =

Canadian politician

Georgie Margaret Day (born May 2, 1947) is a nurse and former political figure in New Brunswick, Canada. She represented Kings Centre and then Hampton-Belleisle in the Legislative Assembly of New Brunswick from 1991 to 1999 as a Liberal member.

She was born in Saint Stephen, New Brunswick. She studied nursing at the Saint John General Hospital and Dalhousie University and took part in the nurse practitioner program at the University of Toronto. Day served as executive assistant to the Minister of Income Assistance from 1987 to 1991. She was a member of the province's Executive Council as Minister of State for Literacy and Adult Education, Minister of State for Youth and Minister of Human Resources. Day was defeated in the 1999 general election. Later that year, Day joined Community Foundations Canada as a coordinator for the Atlantic Region.

Her husband, Joseph A. Day, was named to the Canadian Senate in 2001.

New Brunswick provincial government of Camille Thériault
Cabinet post (1)
| Predecessor | Office | Successor |
|---|---|---|
| Marcelle Mersereau | Minister of Human Resources Development; 1998–1999 | Percy Mockler |
