= California Genealogical Society =

- Abbreviation: CGS
- Established: February 12, 1898
- Purpose: Promoting genealogical research in California and worldwide
- Headquarters: 1841 Berkeley Way, Berkeley, California 94703 (from 2026)
- Publication: The California Nugget
- Affiliations: Federation of Genealogical Societies; FamilySearch Affiliate Library
- Website: californiaancestors.org

The California Genealogical Society (CGS) is a genealogical institution, the oldest and largest in California. Founded in 1898, its mission is to aid Californians in tracing family history through research services, educational resources, online tools, and genealogical databases. The CGS Research Library, one of the largest on the West Coast, contains over 38,000 reference materials — including books, manuscripts, historic maps, microfilms, and family histories — from California and around the world.

== History ==
The California Genealogical Society was founded on February 12, 1898, in San Francisco. The society's original library was devastated by the 1906 San Francisco earthquake. By 1913, the society had rebuilt its collection, growing to one of the largest genealogical libraries on the West Coast.

Between 1913 and 1962, the society's library and collections were housed at various sites in San Francisco, including the San Francisco War Memorial and Performing Arts Center and the San Francisco Public Library. From 1962 to 1982, the society maintained an agreement with the California Historical Society to house CGS collections at that organization's archives.

The society relocated from San Francisco to Oakland in 1997. From 2007 through the mid-2020s, the society's research library and collections were housed in the historic Breuner Building at 2201 Broadway in Oakland's Uptown Arts and Entertainment District.

=== Relocation to Berkeley ===
In February 2026, CGS president Roger Prince announced that the society's board of directors had given final approval for the library to relocate from Oakland to a new facility in Berkeley. The new location remains accessible by BART, and a grand opening is planned for mid-to-late summer 2026. The move coincides with a rebuild of the society's website and digital infrastructure.

== Collections and resources ==
The CGS Research Library holds over 38,000 volumes, including books, historic maps, original manuscripts, pedigree charts, letters, and family histories, many of which are unique to the collection. The library is a FamilySearch Affiliate Library, meaning on-site visitors can access restricted image collections on FamilySearch that are not publicly available from home computers.

The CGS website features The California Names Index, a free, searchable database containing more than 350,000 names drawn from state, county, and local references held in the library. The index is an ongoing project to which new entries are added regularly.

== Membership and programs ==
CGS is a non-profit, largely volunteer-operated organization. Members receive access to exclusive class recordings, tech talks, special interest groups, and a member networking directory. The society publishes The California Nugget, a semi-annual journal featuring articles on genealogical innovations, little-known record sources, and California family and local history.

The society regularly hosts seminars, genealogical workshops, and member meetings on subjects pertaining to genealogy and the history of prominent California figures and families. Programs include a focus on diverse cultural and ethnic communities to serve the breadth of California's population.

CGS is a member of the Federation of Genealogical Societies.
