= Family History Federation =

Genealogical organization

- Type: Non-government organization
- Legal status: Charitable Organization (Education)
- Purpose: to co-ordinate and assist the work of societies or other bodies interested in family history, genealogy and heraldry; to foster the spirit of mutual co-operation, by sponsoring projects in these fields
- Location: Urmston, Manchester, United Kingdom
- Official language: English
- President: Janet Few
- Main organ: FFHS Board of Directors and Executive Committee
- Website: http://www.familyhistoryfederation.com

The Family History Federation previously the Federation of Family History Societies, also known as The Federation, is a United Kingdom-based charitable organisation. In 2019 it rebranded to the Family History Federation.

Its stated principal aims are "to co-ordinate and assist the work of societies or other bodies interested in family history, genealogy and heraldry; to foster the spirit of mutual co-operation, by sponsoring projects in these fields".

Its membership consists of over 160 family history societies and similar genealogical organisations. It publishes The National Burial Index from data supplied largely by family history societies.

In January 2014, The National Archives put online the digitised records of over 8,000 individuals seeking exemption from conscription into the army in Middlesex during the First World War. The Federation assisted in funding this exercise. In the same month, The National Archives announced work to accelerate progress with the revision of the Manorial Documents Register and that funding from The Federation will help meet the cost of four additional county projects over the following two years. The relevant counties are Northumberland, Northamptonshire, Wiltshire and Kent.

The current Chairman is Stephen Manning.

== Arms ==
Coat of arms of Family History Federation
Notes Granted 5 April 1997 Crest Upon a helm with a wreath Or and Gules a crane holding in the beak a sprig of oak Proper fructed Or and supporting with the dexter foot a terrestrial globe Proper the land masses Gules mantled Gules doubled Or. Escutcheon Potenty Or and Azure on a ordure Gules eleven acorns Or. Supporters On the dexter a man habited as a smith holding in the dexter hand a hammer resting upon an anvil Proper and in the sinister hand a horseshoe reversed Or and on the sinister a woman habited as an agricultural labourer holding in the sinister hand a sickle Proper resting upon a garb Or and in the dexter hand a hank of binder twine Proper.
