= Heraldry Society =

There are several heraldry societies around the world. Some of the more notable ones include:

- The Heraldry Society (in England)
- The Heraldry Society of New Zealand
- The Heraldry Society of Scotland
- The Heraldry Society of Southern Africa
- The Royal Heraldry Society of Canada
