= Heraldic society =

A heraldic society is defined as private association of people who are interested in heraldry and heraldic registers are defined as private bodies that register coats of arms.

Heraldic authorities, which have been established by reigning monarchs or governments, are dealt with in a separate article.

== Societies ==
=== International ===
- Academie Internationale d'Heraldique (1949–)
- International Association of Amateur Heralds (1999–)
- Societas Heraldica – it publishes a journal (Sylva Armorum), registers coats of arms, and hosts an internet forum.
- The Society of Heraldic Arts, an international guild of heraldic artists and craftspeople.

=== Europe ===
Arms of The Heraldry Society

==== Belgium ====
- Royal Belgian Genealogical and Heraldic Office (1942) – it publishes a bimonthly review (Le Parchemin), a quarterly link sheet (Le Herault) and studies in Les Recueils.

==== Bulgaria ====
- Bulgarian Heraldry and Vexillology Society

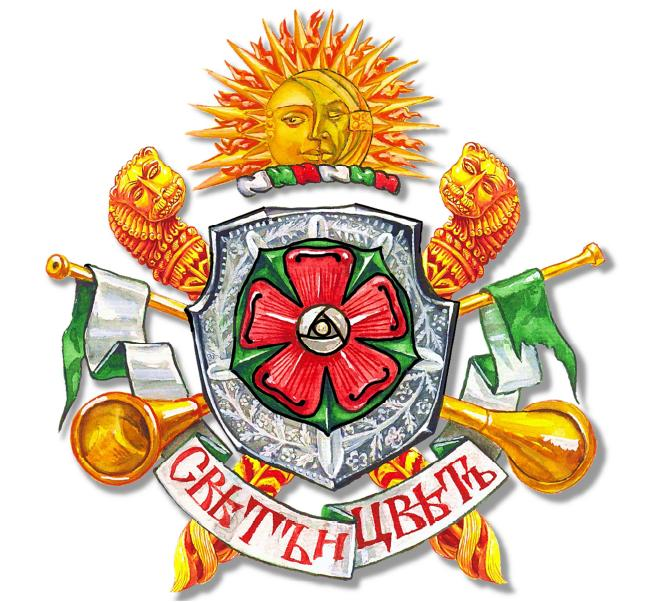
Bulgarian Heraldry and Vexillology Society arms

==== Denmark ====
- Dansk Heraldisk Selskab (Danish Heraldry Society), affiliated with Societas Heraldica Scandinavica

==== England ====
- The Heraldry Society (1947– ) – it publishes a newsletter (Heraldry Gazette) and a journal (The Coat of Arms).
- Cambridge University Heraldic and Genealogical Society (1950–) – it publishes a journal (The Escutcheon).
- Middlesex Heraldry Society (1976–2012) now disbanded – it published a newsletter (The Seaxe).
- Oxford University Heraldry Society (founded 1835, but fell into desuetude in the 1930s). After attempted revivals it is now active again.
- White Lion Society (1986–)
- Norfolk Heraldry Society is being disbanded. Its journal, The Norfolk Standard was published three times a year.
- Suffolk Heraldry Society – The magazine of the Society, The Blazon, is published bi-annually.
- Institute of Heraldic and Genealogical Studies

==== Finland ====
- Suomen heraldinen seura (Heraldry Society of Finland, 1957–)

==== France ====
- Société française d'héraldique et de sigillographie (1937–)

==== Germany ====
- HEROLD, Verein für Heraldik, Genealogie und verwandte Wissenschaften zu Berlin e. V. (1869–). Oldest continuously working Heraldry society in the world.
- Heraldischer Verein 'Zum Kleeblatt' (1888–)
- »Der Wappen-Löwe« – Heraldische Gesellschaft e. V. (1980 –)

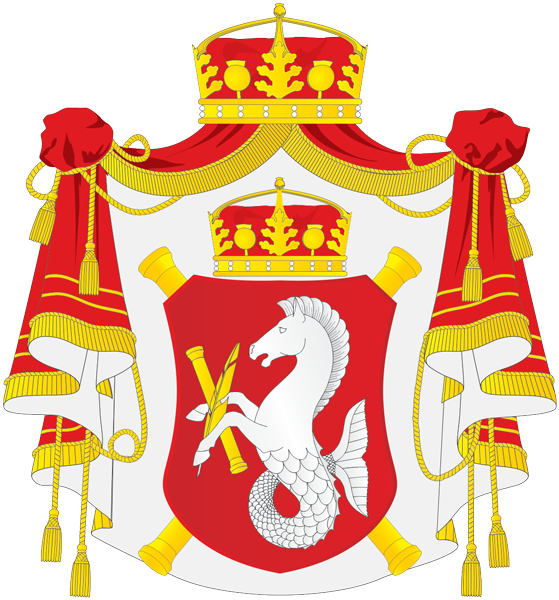
Macedonian Heraldry Society

==== Greece ====
- Heraldic and Genealogical Society of Greece (1975– ) – (Greek: Εραλδική και Γενεαλογική Εταιρεία της Ελλάδος). Appears to be defunct.

==== Macedonia ====
- Macedonian Heraldry Society (2003–)

==== Netherlands ====
- Koninklijk Nederlandsch Gennotschap voor Geslacht- en Wapenkunde (1883–) – it publishes a journal (De Nederlandsche Leeuw).
- Nederlands Genootschap voor Heraldiek, NGH (Dutch Heraldry Society) (2014–) – it publishes a journal (Blazoen) and has three registers for coats of arms: personal/family, ecclesiastical and other organisations.

==== The Nordic countries (Denmark, Finland, Iceland, Norway and Sweden) ====
- Societas Heraldica Scandinavica (1959–) – it publishes a journal (Heraldisk Tidsskrift), a roll of arms (Skandinavisk vapenrulla) and a newsletter.

Arms of the Norwegian Heraldry Society

==== Norway ====
- Norwegian Heraldry Society (1969–) – it publishes a journal (Våpenbrevet).

==== Poland ====
- Polish Heraldry Society (Polish: Polskie Towarzystwo Heraldyczne) (1987–)

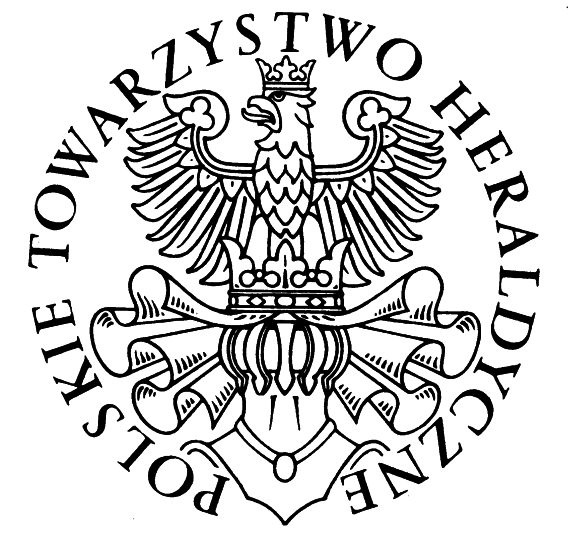
Emblem of the Polish Heraldry Society

- Polish Nobility Association (Polish: Związek Szlachty Polskiej) (1995–)

==== Scotland ====
- Heraldry Society of Scotland (1977–) – it publishes a newsletter (Tak Tent) and a journal (The Double Tressure), and hosts an internet forum.
- Lord Lyon Society (2022–)

==== Serbia ====
- Serbian Heraldry Society (1991–)
- CROM – Board for Heraldic and Genealogical Studies (2001–)

==== Slovenia ====
- Heraldica Slovenica (1991–)

==== Spain ====
- Royal Academy of Genealogy and Heraldry of Madrid (1988–)
- Armand de Fluvià Institution of Genealogy and Heraldry (2007–)

==== Sweden ====
- Swedish Heraldry Society (1976–) – it publishes a journal (Vapenbilden).

==== Switzerland ====
- Société Suisse d'Héraldique – Schweizerisches Heraldische Gesellschaft (1891–)

==== Ukraine ====
- Ukrainian Heraldry Society (1990–)

=== Africa ===
==== South Africa ====
- Heraldry Society of Southern Africa (1953– ) – it publishes a journal (Arma).

==== Zimbabwe ====
- Heraldry & Genealogy Society of Zimbabwe (1970–)

=== North America ===
==== Canada ====
- Royal Heraldry Society of Canada (1966–) – it publishes a newsletter (Gonfanon) and two journals (Heraldry in Canada and Alta Studia Heraldica) and hosts an internet forum..

==== United States of America ====
- Committee on Heraldry of the New England Historic Genealogical Society (1864–)
- American College of Heraldry (1972–)
- College of Arms Foundation (1984–)
- American Heraldry Society (2003–) – it publishes a newsletter (The Courant) and a journal (The American Herald), and hosts an internet forum.
- Society of Scottish Armigers
- Augustan Society

=== Oceania ===
Heraldry Society of New Zealand Arms

==== Australia ====
- Australian Heraldry Society (1961–) – it publishes a journal (Heraldry News).
- Heraldry & Genealogy Society of Canberra (1964–) – it publishes a journal (The Ancestral Searcher).

==== New Zealand ====
- The Heraldry Society of New Zealand (1962–)
