= Armorial of schools in England =

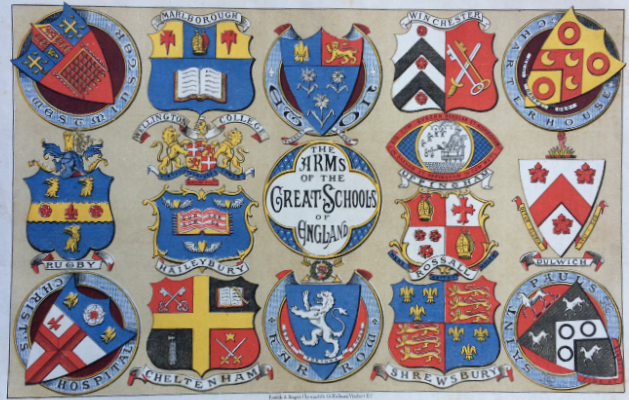
1882 montage from 'The Boy's Own Paper' interpreting the arms of 16 prominent English schools. From top to bottom, left to right: Westminster, Marlborough, Eton, Winchester, Charterhouse, Wellington College, Uppingham, Rugby, Haileybury, Rossall, Dulwich, Christ's Hospital, Cheltenham, Harrow, Shrewsbury, Saint Paul's.

This is a list of the historical coats of arms or 'full heraldic achievements' of English primary and secondary education schools, grouped by region, as granted by the College of Arms or adopted by custom and practice. For some schools, the full heraldic achievement (shield, crest, mantling and sometimes also supporters and motto) is displayed; for others just the escutcheon (shield) is shown.

== East of England ==
Image	Details
	Aldenham, assumed (adopted arms of the school's founder Richard Platt) Escutcheon: Or, fretty sable plattée Crest: A demi-lion rampant proper holding in the paws a plate Motto: In God Is All Our Trust
	Bedford, assumed (adopted arms of the school's benefactor William Harpur) Escutcheon: Azure, on a fess between three eagles displayed or, a fret between two martlets of the first, impaling, on the dexter side chequy or and azure, a fess argent fretty gules bezanté and on the sinister, per chevron gules and argent, three trefoils slipped, counterchanged, on a chief of the second three martlets of the first. Crest: On a wreath of the colours [Or and Azure], an eagle wings expanded Azure, perched upon a crescent Or, the latter charged in the centre with a fret and on either side with a martlet, all Azure; Motto: Floreat Schola Bedfordiensis (May Bedford School Flourish)
	Bedford Modern assumed (adopted from arms of William Harpur) Escutcheon: Azure, on a fess or between three eagles displayed of the last, a fret between two martlets of the first. Crest: On a wreath of the colours, a demi-eagle displayed or, charged on the breast with a fret azure. Motto: Floreat Bedfordia (May Bedford flourish)
	Berkhamsted, adopted arms of the school's founder John Incent Escutcheon: Per pale dexter gules two swords in saltire points upwards proper, in the centre chief point the letter " D " impaling sinister argent, on a bend gules a naked man holding in his dexter hand above his head a (? wreath or wrestling collar), and in the dexter chief point a duck, all proper. Motto: Virtus laudata crescit (Greatness Increases with Praise") Note: in 2008 the school revised its emblem
	Boston Grammar, adopted from the former arms of the borough of Boston Escutcheon: Sable, three crowns paly Or; Motto: Floreat Bostona (May Boston flourish)
	Bourne Grammar, Lincolnshire, interpreted from the arms of John Wake Escutcheon: Gules, two bars Or, in chief three bezants. Motto: Vigila et Ora (Watch and pray)
	Brentwood, granted 19 July 1957. Escutcheon: Gules, a chevron between three lions' gambs erased and a bordure Argent, in the honour point a fleur-de-lys Or, on a chief also Argent an eagle displayed looking to the sinister Sable, beaked and legged and anciently crowned gold (Browne), impaling Quarterly, first and fourth Argent, a chevron Gules between three lions' faces Sable (Farington), second Gules three pierced cinquefoils Argent, (Farington), third Argent a cross engrailed Sable between four torteaux (Clayton); the whole within a bordure Gules. Motto: Virtue, Learning, Manners The arms are adopted from those of the school's founder Anthony Browne.
	Brentwood Ursuline Convent, granted 2 September 1964 Escutcheon: Azure, two lilies argent, seeded Or, slipped vert, in base an antique lamp Or, enflamed argent; on a chief gules a dove volant affronty gold. Crest: On a wreath of the colours, In front of three arrows, one in pale and two in saltire azure, barbs downward and argent, a cross formy Or charged with a rose gules barbed and seeded proper. Mantled azure, doubled Or. Motto: Duty
	Bungay, adopted at unknown date (interpretation of arms of founder Lionel Throckmorton) Escutcheon: Sable, on a chevron argent three bars Gules. Motto: Clarior Usta Rogo (I beseech thee to burn more brightly)
	Colchester Royal Grammar, adopted from the civic arms of Colchester at unknown date Escutcheon: Argent a cross raguly, couped proper, the arms joined in fylfot, between two ducal coronets in chief or the bottom part of the cross enfiled with a ducal coronet of the last, beneath each coronet a nail of the first, that in base piercing the cross. Motto: Vitae Corona Fides (Faith is the Crown of Life)
	Culford, granted 10 May 1937 Escutcheon: Argent, on a cross Azure three crowns Or in fess and two escallops of the first in pale, in the first quarter a lion rampant reguardant of the second. Crest: On a wreath Argent and Azure, a book Argent edged Or ensigned with a crown Proper. Motto: Viriliter Agite, Estote Fortes (Quit ye like men, be strong)
	Davenant Foundation, Loughton, granted 9 November 1961 Escutcheon: Gules, three escallops between seven cross crosslets fitchee, three, one, two, and one, argent, within a bordure of the same charged with eight lows of flame proper. Crest: On a wreath argent, gules and sable, A lymphad sable, pennons and flags flying gules, at the masthead a beacon enflamed proper, the sail charged with the Arms. Motto: Nurturing mind, body and spirit
	Felixstowe (closed 1994), granted 19 November 1954 Escutcheon: Gules, a cross patonce argent between in the first quarter a pelican proper, in the second a garb Or, in the third a cinquefoil gold, and in the fourth a falcon also proper. Crest: On a wreath of the colours, In front of an open book proper, bound sable, a lion rampant Or. Motto: Fide Constantia (Faith and Constancy)
	Felsted, granted 12 April 1963 Escutcheon: Gules, a chevron between three crosses botonny Or. Motto: Garde Ta Foy (Keep Faith) Adopted arms of the school's founder Richard Rich
	Framlingham, granted 5 September 1967 Escutcheon: Azure, a chevron between three antique crowns argent, each enfiled with two arrows in saltire Or. Crest: On a wreath of the colours, Out of an antique crown, between two branches of olive fructed or, a chestnut horse's head proper. Motto: Studio Sapientia Crescit (Wisdom grows with study)
	Gresham's, Holt, Norfolk, adopted with a formal grant (version of John Gresham's arms) 16 December 1955 Escutcheon: a) Fishmongers Company: Azure, three dolphins embowed in pale between two pairs of sea luces saltirewise proper crowned or on a chief gules six keys in three saltires ward ends upwards of the second. b) Version of John Gresham's arms: Argent, a chevron ermines between three pierced mullets sable; on a chief gules a dolphin naiant also argent, ducally crowned Or, between on the dexter and sinister two keys in saltire, wards upwards and outwards, gold. Crest: a) Fishmongers Company: On a wreath argent and sable, Two cubit arms, the dexter vested Or cuffed azure, the sinister azure cuffed Or, the hands argent holding an Imperial Crown proper. Mantled on the dexter side gules, doubled Or, on the sinister side azure, doubled argent. b) Version of John Gresham's arms: On a wreath argent and sable, A grasshopper proper supporting a key erect Or, wards to the sinister. Motto: All Worship Be To God Only The school uses two escutcheons one being the arms of the Fishmongers' Company and the other a version of those of the founder John Gresham
	Haberdashers', Elstree, adopted arms of the Worshipful Company of Haberdashers granted 1446 Escutcheon: Nebuly argent and azure, on a bend gules a lion passant guardant or Crest: On a helm, on a wreath argent and azure, issuant out of the clouds two naked arms holding a laurel garland proper Supporters: Two Goats of India argent, flecked gules, armed and unguled or Motto: Serve and Obey
	Haileybury and Imperial Service, granted 18 August 1943 Escutcheon: Azure, an open book argent bound gules edged and garnished with seven clasps gold and inscribed with the words "Sursum Corda" sable, the initial letters of the third, between three hearts Or, winged of the. second; on a chief also Or an anchor cabled and a sword, the point upwards, in saltire of the field. Crest: On a wreath Or and azure, A lion sejant guardant erect, crowned with an Eastern crown Or, and holding between the forepaws a scroll with the seal pendent therefrom proper. Motto: Fear God Honour The King
	Ipswich, adopted Tudor arms of Queen Elizabeth I Escutcheon: Quarterly, I and IV: Azure three fleurs-de-lis Or; II and III: Gules three lions passant guardant in pale Or, armed and langued Azure. Motto: Semper Eadem (Always The Same)
	Kimbolton, adopted at unknown date Escutcheon: Argent a Cross Azure in the first quarter an Anchor sable Motto: Spes Durat Avorum (May the hopes of our forefathers endure)
	King Edward VI Grammar, Chelmsford, assumed arms of its founder, Edward VI Escutcheon: Quarterly, I and IV: Azure three fleurs-de-lis Or; II and III: Gules three lions passant guardant in pale Or, armed and langued Azure. Motto: Quicquid agas sapiens age fortiter ex animoque ('Whatsoever thy hand findeth to do, do it with thy might'), Ecc 9:10
	King Edward VI Grammar, Louth, adopted arms of King Edward VI Escutcheon: Quarterly, I and IV: Azure three fleurs-de-lis Or; II and III: Gules three lions passant guardant in pale Or, armed and langued Azure. Motto: Dieu Et Mon Droit (God and my right)
	The Leys, Cambridge, granted 31 March 1914 Escutcheon: Or, a cross Gules charged in the centre with a mullet of the field, on a chief Ermine an open book Argent embellished of the first between two roses of the second, barbed and seeded Proper. Crest: On a wreath Or and Gules, a wyvern Proper resting the dexter claw on an antique lamp Or flaming Gules. Motto: In Fide Fiducia (In Faith Is Our Trust)
	Merchant Taylors', Northwood, adopted arms of the Worshipful Company of Merchant Taylors Crest: On a wreath argent and azure, On a mount vert a lamb argent in sunbeams Or. Mantled gules, doubled argent Escutcheon: Argent, a pavilion imperial purple [i.e. crimson] garnished Or [lined ermine] between two mantles also imperial purple [lined ermine]; on a chief azure a lion passant [guardant] gold Supporters: On either side a camel Or; Motto: Concordia parvae res crescunt (Small things grow in harmony)
	Norwich, adopted arms of King Edward VI Escutcheon: Quarterly, I and IV: Azure three fleurs-de-lis Or; II and III: Gules three lions passant guardant in pale Or, armed and langued Azure. Motto: Praemia Virtutis Honores (Honours are the rewards of virtue)
	Oundle, adopted arms of the Worshipful Company of Grocers Escutcheon: Argent, a chevron gules between nine cloves sable Motto: God Grant Grace
	Paston, Norfolk, adopted arms of the arms of founder William Paston Escutcheon: Argent, six fleurs-de-lis azure, three, two, and one; a chief indented or. Crest: On a torse argent and sable, a pelican or vulning herself proper Crest: A griffin sejant with wings displayed or, holding in the beak a chaplet gules Motto: De mieux en mieux en pour tout (From good to better everywhere)
	Perse, Cambridge Escutcheon: Sable, a chevron ermine, between three cockatrice's heads erased argent, langued gules. Crest: On a torse argent and sable, a pelican or vulning herself proper Motto: Qui facit per alium facit per se (He who does things for others does them for himself)
	Princess Helena, Hitchen (closed 2021), granted 2 August 1928 Escutcheon: Per fesse gules and azure, in chief a representation of the Coronet of Her Highness Princess Helena Victoria Or, and in base an open book argent, edges and clasps gold, inscribed with the words "fortis qui se vincit" sable; all between two flaunches also argent, each charged with a cross couped between two roses in pale also gules barbed and seeded proper. Motto: Fortis Qui Se Vincit (Strong is the one who conquers self)
	St Albans Escutcheon: Azure, a Saltire Or. Motto: Non Nobis Nati (Born not for ourselves) The school coat of arms is composed of the cross of Saint Alban together with the School motto.
	St Clement Danes, Chorleywood, granted 10 September 1963 Escutcheon: Azure, an anchor Or, the stock banded vert; on a bordure engrailed gold eight hearts gules. Motto: Loyauté m'oblige (Loyalty binds me)
	St Edmund's, Ware, granted 4 June 1994 (although in use since 1895) Escutcheon: Azure three Suns in Splendour Or each charged with an annulet Gules with a border Argent fracted in four by a Cross Gules; Crest: Upon a helmet wreathed and mantled Azure doubled Or a Coney Sable sejant erect bearing upon the sinister shoulder a pole proper bearing a banner of St. George; Motto: Avita Pro Fide (For the faith of our fathers)
	Saint Felix, Southwold, granted 10 October 1933 Escutcheon: Vert, a chevron between in chief to the dexter a Catherine wheel and to the sinister a lymphad, and in base a mitre, all Or. Crest: Issuant out of a coronet composed of six roses set upon a rim Or, a griffin's head holding in the beak a taper inflamed proper. Motto: Felix Quia Fortis (Happiness through Strength)
	Saint Margaret's, Bushey, granted 26 September 1957 Escutcheon: Or, on a cross gules a Saxon crown gold; on a chief vert an open book proper, bound also gules, edged of the first. Motto: Sursum corda, habemus ad Dominum (Hearts aloft, we have to the Lord)
	Southend High School for Boys, granted 15 February 1934 Escutcheon: Gules, two keys in pile, bows interlaced, wards upwards and inwards, Or surmounted by a sword erect argent, pommel and hilt of the second; on a chief sable a cross engrailed of the third charged with an ermine spot of the fourth. Crest: On a wreath Or and vert, Issuant from the battlements of a tower gules two keys and a sword as in the Arms; Motto: Forti nihil difficile (To the determined, nothing is difficult)
	Southend High School for Girls, granted 10 May 1938 Escutcheon: Gules, three lilies argent issuant from a stalk enfiled in base by the bows of two keys interlaced in pile, the wards inwards, Or; on a chief sable a cross engrailed of the second charged with an ermine spot of the fourth Crest: On a wreath Or and vert, Issuant from the battlements of a tower gules, masoned argent, three lilies and two keys as in the Arms; Motto: Ad Dei Gloriam (Glory to God)
	Thetford Grammar, adopted arms of Richard Fulmerston who refounded the school in 1566 Escutcheon: Or, on a fesse between three doves azure, a rose between two garbs of the field Motto: Loyaute me oblige (Loyalty binds me)
	Watford Grammar, adopted arms of school benefactors John Chilcot and Richard Platt Escutcheon: Dexter : Or, on a pile between two lions rampant gules, three garbs of the field. Sinister : Or, fretty sable, at each intersection a plate Crest: Dexter : On a wreath of the colours, two garbs in saltire or. Sinister : On a wreath of the colours, a demi-lion rampant proper, holding in its paws a plate Motto: Sperate Parati (Go Forward with Preparation)
	Woodbridge, adapted from the arms of school founder Thomas Seckford Escutcheon: Motto: Pro Deo Rege Patria (For God, king and country)

== East Midlands ==
Image	Details
	Derby (closed in 1989), granted 20 November 1962 Escutcheon: Per pale argent and sable, an open book proper, edged and clasped Or, bound gules, the pages inscribed 1554 in Arabic numerals, the whole ensigned by an ancient crown gold; on a chief gules between two crosses potent quadrate a stag lodged in a park also Or. Motto: Vita Sine Litteris Mors (Life without learning is death)
	Derby Grammar, granted 10 October 1997 Escutcheon: Per pale Vert and Sable in chief two Crosses Potent quadrate and in base a Stag lodged within a Palisade all Argent. Crest: Upon a Helm with a Wreath Or and Vert between two Crosses Potent quadrate a Mitre Or mantled Vert doubled Or. Motto: Vita Sine Litteris Mors (Life without learning is death)
	Loughborough Grammar, granted 10 October 1997 Escutcheon: Argent, a chevron Azure between three storks proper. Motto: Vires Acquirit Eundo (We Gather Strength As We Go)
	Mount St Mary's College (closed in 2025), Spinkhill, granted 23 June 1941. Escutcheon: Or, a chevron between three crescents Azure; on a canton of the last the Roman letters IHS between in chief a Passion Cross and in base three passion nails pilewise, all of the first. Crest: On a wreath Or and Azure, a lily flowered stalked and leaved Proper between two wings displayed Or. Motto: Sine Macula (Without Blemish)
	Nottingham High, granted 22 March 1949 Escutcheon: Ermine, a lozenge argent charged with three blackbirds rising proper; on a chief gules an open book also proper, garnished Or, between two ducal coronets of the last. Crest: On a wreath argent and gules, A squirrel sejant gules holding between the paws a ducal coronet Or. Motto: Lauda Finem (Praise to the End)
	Queen Elizabeth's Grammar School, Ashbourne, adopted from the arms of school founder and benefactor Thomas Cokayne Escutcheon: Argent, three cocks gules Motto: En bon espoyr (In good hope)
	Queen Elizabeth Grammar School, Gainsborough (merged), granted 3 March 1952 Escutcheon: Vert, a sun in splendour between a pair of scales in chief and an ancient crown in base, all within a chain in orle Or. Crest: On a wreath of the colours, A falcon, wings elevated and addorsed, argent, beaked, membered and belied Or, supporting with the dexter claw a link [= torch] gold enfiamed proper Motto: Fortiter prospicere gloriari praeteritis (To bravely look ahead, to glory in the past) Note: Queen Elizabeth Grammar School merged in 1983 with Gainsborough High School to form Queen Elizabeth High School
	Ratcliffe College, Leicester, granted 23 September 1936 Escutcheon: Azure, six mullets, three, two and one, argent; on a chief Or three pellets, the centre one charged with a lion rampant of the third, the dexter with a lily and the sinister with a swallow both of the second. Crest: On a wreath of the colours, A pelican in her piety affronte argent, vulning herself proper, the nest Or. Motto: Legis Plenitudo Charitas (Love fulfills the Law)
	Repton, adopted arms of founder John Port Escutcheon: Azure, a fesse engrailed between three doves, each holding in its beak a cross forme fitche all or Motto: Porta Vacat Culpa (The gate is free from blame)
	Wellingborough, granted 11 November 1924 Escutcheon: Quarterly gules and vert, a pile Or surmounted of a fesse wavy argent, in chief a rose of the first, barbed and seeded proper, and in base an open book of the last. Mottos: Altiora peto (Seeing higher things) and Salus in Arduis (A stronghold in difficulties)
	Worksop, adopted at unknown date Escutcheon: Azure, a cross patonce Or between four lions rampant Or; Motto: Semper ad coelestia (Always unto the heavens); Note: until 1925 the school was called St Cuthbert's College. The cross patonce is a representation of St Cuthbert's cross. The school's arms are very similar to Durham School, also with a connection to this saint.

== London ==
Image	Details
	Arnold House, St John's Wood, granted 18 May 2004. Escutcheon: Per saltire Gules and Verte a cross flory Argent between twelve bezants in saltire. Crest: On a wreath Argent and Gules, a stork Or beaked and legged Gules, resting the dexter foot on a propeller Vert. Motto: Conquer We Shall
	Bancroft's, Woodford Green, adopted arms of the Worshipful Company of Drapers Escutcheon: Azure, three clouds, radiated proper, each adorned with a Triple Crown Or; Supporters: Two lions, Or, pelletted Crest: On the helm, a wreath of the Company’s colours, thereon, a mount Vert, thereon a Ram couchant Or, armed Sable The whole hatchment mantled gules doubled argent. Motto: Unto God Only be Honour and Glory
	Barking Abbey, granted 10 June 1955 Escutcheon: Azure, in chief three lilies in fesse argent, stalked leaved and slipped vert, and in base· as many roses Or, barbed and seeded proper; on a bordure gules, eight plates. Crest: On a wreath Or and azure, In front of a representation of Barking Abbey Curfew Tower an open book proper, edged Or and bound gules. Motto: Give and Expect the Best
	Bishop Challoner, Shadwell, adopted from the arms of Richard Challoner Escutcheon: Azure, a chevron between two mullets in chief and a cross in base Or
	Campion, Hornchurch, granted 1 June 1967 Escutcheon: Sanguine, a campion flower and in chief the letters IHS ensigned by a cross with three passion nails in pile below the letters, being the device of the Society of Jesus, between a dexter and a sinister canton Or, each charged with a torch inflamed proper. Crest: On a wreath of the colours, A dove displayed argent, beaked and legged Or, on each wing a campion flower sanguine, the head ensigned by a tongue of flame proper. Motto: Auctore Deo (The Enterprise is of God)
	Coopers' Company and Coborn School, Upminster, adopted arms associated with benefactor Prisca Coburn (née Forster). Escutcheon: Gyronny of 8 gules and sable on a chevron between three annulets or, a royne between two broad axes azure, a chief vert thereon three lilies argent. Crest: On a wreath or and azure, a demi heathcock with body azure semee of annulets gold, the wings argent semee of annulets sable holding in the beak a lily argent slipped and leafed vert Supporters Two supporters on either side a camel gules semee of annulets and bridled or Motto: Love as Brethren
	City of London, adopted arms of the City of London Escutcheon: Argent a Cross Gules in the first quarter a Sword in pale point upwards of the last Crest: On a Wreath of the Colours a Dragon's sinister Wing Argent charged on the underside with a Cross throughout Gules; Supporters On either side a Dragon Argent charged on the undersides of the wings with a Cross throughout Gules; Motto: Domine Dirige Nos (Lord, Guide Us)
	Croham Hurst (closed 2008), Croydon, granted 1 May 1958 Escutcheon: Per chevron azure and vert, in chief an ancient hand lamp Or, enflamed proper, between a slip of lime and a slip of vine, both leaved and fructed, also proper, in base a sperver gold lined purpure. Crest: On a wreath of the colours, A demi lion argent sup porting with the paws a key Or, the ward upwards and outwards, all between two posies of dandelion leaved, flowered and seeded proper. Motto: Finis Coronat Opus (The End Crowns the Work)
	Dulwich, granted 1935. Escutcheon: Argent, a chevron between three cinquefoils Gules; a chief Ermine, thereon a cinquefoil of the second. Crest: On a wreath Argent and Gules, issuant from flames of fire, a cubit arm, the hand grasping a heart, all Proper. Motto: Detur Gloria Soli Deo (Let Glory Be Given To God Alone) The arms are derived from those of the school's founder Edward Alleyn
	Eltham, granted 10 May 1935 Escutcheon: Azure, two pilgrims' staves in saltire argent surmounted by a cross flory Or. Crest: On a wreath of the colours, In front of two torches in saltire Or enflamed proper an open book also proper. Motto: Gloria Filiorum Patres (The fathers are the glory of the sons)
	Farringtons, Chislehurst, granted 10 March 1928 Escutcheon: Vert, three roses Or between two barrulets argent, in chief a wyvem between two keys erect, wards to the dexter, of the second and in base an ancient lamp also of the second, inflamed proper. A canton ermine, thereon (with the permission of Her Majesty) the Cypher of Her Majesty Queen Mary also gold. Motto: Posside sapientiam (Possess wisdom)
	Hampton, granted 1900, adopted arms of Nicholas Pigeon, a major benefactor of the school Escutcheon: Or, on each of three escutcheons Azure, a lion rampant of the field, langued Gules; Supporter: Held from behind with the left forepaw by a lion Or langued Gules, holding in the right forepaw a quill pen Argent. Motto: Praestat Opes Sapientia (Wisdom surpasses wealth)
	Harrow, granted 3 October 1929, although used prior to this Escutcheon: Azure, a lion rampant, in dexter chief two arrows in saltire, points downward, tied in the centre with a bow and enfiled with a wreath of laurel, all argent Mottoes: Stet Fortuna Domus (Let the Fortune of the House Stand); Donorum Dei Dispensatio Fidelis (The Faithful Dispensation of the Gifts of God)
	Highgate Escutcheon: Argent, a sword fesseways, point to the dexter proper, pommel and hilt gold, between in chief an esquire's helmet also proper, and in base a griffin's head erased sable. Motto: Altiora in Votis (Higher through prayer)
	Hill House Escutcheon: Gules, a chevron Vair between two escallops Argent in chief and a cross flory Argent in base. Crest: A lion rampant guardant Proper, armed and langued Gules, holding a cross pattée Gules and statant upon an escallop Argent. Motto: Semper vigilans (Always vigilant)
	John Lyon School, Harrow Escutcheon: Argent, a lion rampant Gules; Motto: Stet Fortuna Domus (Let the Fortune of the House Stand) The school is closely associated with Harrow School and therefore has the same motto and a similar escutcheon and badge
	John Roan, Greenwich, granted 8 August 1927 Escutcheon: Vert, three stags trippant within an orle of fourteen mullets Or. Crest: On a wreath of the colours, In front of a stag's head erased, in the mouth a sprig of oak, proper, an anchor fessewise, stock to the dexter, Vert. Motto: Honore Et Labore (By work and honour)
	Kingston Grammar, adopted at unknown date Escutcheon: Gules, on a chevron Argent between three eagles rising Or, as many scallop shells umbrated Argent; Motto: Bene Agere ac Lætari (Work well and be happy)
	Langley Park School for Boys, Beckenham granted 4 August 1926. Escutcheon: Tierced in pale Gules, Azure and lozengy Gules and Ermine the first charged with a horse forcene Argent the second with a cross moline Or. Crest: On a wreath Argent and Gules, an oak tree fructed Proper an escutcheon Or charged with a mitre Gules, mantled Gules doubled Argent. Motto: Mores Et Studia (Morals and Study)
	Latymer School, Edmonton, adopted arms of the school's founder Edward Latymer. Escutcheon: Quarterly: 1st and 4th grandquarter Azure a chevron between seven cross crosslets, and in canton a cinquefoil, all Argent; 2nd and 3rd grandquarter Quarterly, 1st and 4th Sable, a fess wavy between three leopard's heads erased Or, 2nd and 3rd Argent, on a chevron Sable three cinquefoils Or. Motto: Qui Patitur Vincit (He who endures, wins)
	Latymer Upper School, Hammersmith adopted from the arms of the school's founder Edward Latymer Escutcheon: Azure a chevron between seven cross crosslets, and in canton a cinquefoil, all Argent. Motto: formerly Paulatim Ergo Certe (Slowly therefore surely). Currently none.
	London Oratory, granted 1995. Escutcheon: Gules a bar wavy Argent between three Mullets of eight points Or. Crest: Upon a Wreath Argent and Gules Issuant from a Celestial Crown Or a demi-Lion Bleu Celeste grasping a Staff Or flying therefrom to the sinister a Pennant Argent charged with six Gouttes in fess Gules. Motto: Respice Finem (Respect the End)
	Mill Hill, granted 1935 Escutcheon: Argent; a Cross Quadrant Gules, charged with an Open Book proper; on a Chief Azure three Martlets Or. Motto: Et Virtutem Et Musas (Character and Culture)
	St Dunstan's, Catford, granted or adopted on unknown date Escutcheon: Quarterly: 1st, Azure, a representation of Saint Dunstan proper; 2nd, 3rd and 4th, Argent; Motto: Albam Exorna (Adorn the white)
	St Ignatius College, Enfield, granted 18 December 1953 Escutcheon: Per fesse argent and Or, in chief a caldron suspended by a hain sable, supported by two wolves rampant gules, and in base three bendlets vert. Crest: On a wreath argent and vert, A torch sable, errfiamed proper, between four ostrich feathers, the inner Or, the outer gules Motto: Ad majorem Dei gloriam (For the greater glory of God)
	St Paul's, Barnes, adopted arms of the school's founder John Colet Escutcheon: Sable on a chevron Argent between three Hinds trippant Argent three Annulets Sable; Motto: Fide Et Literis (By Faith and By Learning)
	Sir John Cass Redcoat School Stepney, granted 7 May 1966 Escutcheon: Argent, on a chevron sable cottised and between in chief two ship's helms and in base a passion cross gules, three fountains Crest: On a wreath argent and gules, A dexter cubit arm proper, vested gules purfled argent, cuffed ermine, the hand holding a quill pen in bend sinister gules Note: The school is currently named Stepney All Saints School
	Streatham and Clapham High School, granted 24 April 2018 Escutcheon: Crest: Motto: Ad sapientiam sine metu (Towards wisdom unafraid)
	Wallington County Grammar, adopted arms of William Warenne, Earl of Surrey Escutcheon: Checky Or And Azure; Motto: Per Ardua ad Summa (Through Difficulties to the Heights) Wallington was formerly located in the county of Surrey
	Westminster, adopted arms of Edward the Confessor Escutcheon: Azure, a cross patonce between five martlets, one in each quarter and one in base ail or, with a chief argent, thereon a pale, charged with the arms of France and England quarterly between two roses gules Motto: Dat Deus Incrementum (God Gives the Increase) Also used by Westminster Abbey
	Whitgift, Croydon, assumed - adopted arms of John Whitgift when he served as Archbishop of Canterbury Escutcheon: Party per pale Azure and Argent; the first charged with an episcopal staff in pale Or surmounted by a pall Proper edged and fringed of the second charged with four crosses pattée fitchée Sable; the second charged with a cross fleury at the ends Sable charged with four bezants Motto: Vincit qui Patitur (He who endures, wins) The school uses as a logo a bishop's crozier and mitre with an image of part of Whitgift's arms i.e. the cross flory sable with four bezants.
	Wilson's, Wallington, granted 1985 but in use earlier, adopted from arms of founder Edward Wilson Escutcheon: Sable a Wolf salient Or and a Barrulet enhanced Argent in Chief a Fleur de Lys also Argent between two Bezants all between a Bordure Gold; Crest: upon a Helm with a Wreath Or and Sable a demi Wolf salient Sable holding between its paws an Ogress charged with a Fleur de Lys Argent Mantled Sable doubled Or. Motto: Non Sibi Sed Omnibus (Not for self, but for all)

== North East England ==
Image	Details
	Durham, adopted at unknown date Escutcheon: Azure, a cross patonce Or, between four lions rampant Argent; Motto: Floreat Dunelmia (Let Durham Flourish)
	King's, Tynemouth, granted 30 October 1961 Escutcheon: Gules, two keys in saltire between in chief a representation of St. Cuthbert's pectoral cross Or, in base an ancient crown, and in fesse two like crowns Or. Crest: On a wreath of the colours, A representation of H.M.S. Royal Sovereign of early nineteenth century date Or, the lower mainsail gules charged with a lion's head affrontee crowned with a naval crown gold. Motto: Moribus Civilis (Civilised Behaviour)
	Red House, Stockton-on-Tees, granted 15 May 1950. Escutcheon: Ermine, a chevron Gules between three crosses cercelée Sable; on a chief of the second as many mullets Argent. Crest: On a wreath of the colours, a reindeer lodged Proper gorged with a chain Or, pendant therefrom an escutcheon Ermine charged with a cross cercelée Sable. Motto: Veritas In Virtute (Truth in Virtue)
	Royal Grammar School, Newcastle upon Tyne, granted 11 November 1931. Escutcheon: Gules, two horses' heads erased in chief and in base a tower triple-towered argent; on a chief of the second a torteau charged with a lion passant guardant Or between two hurts each charged with a fleur-de-lis gold Motto: Discendo Duces (By Learning, You Will Lead)

== North West England ==
Image	Details
	Birkenhead, granted 4 March 1959 Escutcheon: Quarterly Gules and Or, in the first quarter a lion passant argent, over all a crosier erect, crook to the sinister, surmounted by an open book also Argent, the pages inscribed with the words BEATI MVNDO CORDE in letters Sable. Crest: On a wreath Or and Gules, a coronet composed of eight silver-birch leaves set upon a rim Vert. Motto: Beati Mundo Corde (Blessed are the pure in heart)
	Bolton, granted 6 September 1923 Escutcheon: Argent, two bends Sable, the upper engrailed; on a chief of the second between a rose and a chaplet Or an open book Proper. Crest (boys' division only): On a wreath Argent and Sable, Between two sprigs of laurel a cock statant Proper, combed and wattled Gules, facing the dexter on a trumpet Or facing the sinister. Motto: Mutare Vel Timere Spemo (I scorn to change or to fear)
	Chetham's, adopted from arms of school's founder Humphrey Chetham Escutcheon: Quarterly 1 and 4 argent, a griffin segreant Gules, within a bordure, Sable, bezantee. 2 Argent a chevron between three cramp-irons, Gules. 3 Gules a cross double-crossed, Or; over all charged with a crescent for difference. Crest: A demi-griffin Gules charged with a cross double-crossed, Or; Motto: Quod tuum tene (Keep what is your own)
	Derby High School, Bury, granted 7 September 1959. Escutcheon: Quarterly argent and azure, on a bend of the last between in the second quarter an open book also argent edged and bound Or and in the third quarter a cogwheel also Or, three stags' heads caboshed gold Crest: Out of a coronet composed of four roses gules barbed and seeded proper set upon a rim Or, a demi stag gold gorged with a torse argent and azure and supporting a torch erect also gold enflamed proper Motto: Industria, Constantia, Sapientia. (Diligence, Determination, Wisdom)
	Hulme Grammar, adopted at unknown date Escutcheon: Barry of eight, or and azure, on a canton argent, a chaplet gules proper.' Crest: A lion's head couped gules on a cap of maintenance (gules turned up ermine) upon the helmet of a gentleman. Motto: Fide Sed Cui Vide (Trust, but see to whom); Note: the school has adopted a modified version (stylised line drawing) of the above arms as a logo. The blazoned arms are those of William Hulme, whose trust supported the school in the 19th century.
	Hutton Grammar, adopted at unknown date Escutcheon: Azure, three swans Argent, on a chief per pale Gules and Argent, three bezants Or; Crest: Motto: Aut disce aut discede (Either learn or leave)
	King's, Macclesfield, granted 4 March 1968 Escutcheon: Argent, a lion rampant guardant holding between the forepaws a fleur-de-lys azure, banded Or; on a chief gules three greyhounds' heads couped argent, collared Or.
	Kirkham Grammar, granted 27 June 1929 Escutcheon: Per chevron engrailed Or and azure, in chief two doves, wings elevated and endorsed, of the second, beaked and legged gules, each holding in the beak an olive branch proper, and in base upon a cloud, the sunbeams issuing, an ancient imperial crown tripled also proper. Crest: On a wreath of the colours, Upon a book proper a windmill Or. Motto: Ingredere Ut Proficias (Enter So That You May Progress)
	Liverpool College, assumed at unknown date Escutcheon: Per fess Gules and Azure; in chief a Royal Crown Or resting upon a Cushion of the first, surmounting a Sceptre and a Bishop’s Crosier in saltire of the third; in base an Open Book Argent. Crest: A Bishop’s Mitre proper. Motto: Non solum ingenii verum etiam virtutis ('Not only the intellect, but also the character')
	Liverpool Collegiate (closed 1987), granted 20 December 1962 Escutcheon: Or, a cormorant, wings elevated and addorsed, sable, in the beak a rose gules barbed seeded slipped and leaved proper; on a chief azure an open book argent, edged and bound gold, between two roses silver. Motto: Ut Olim Ingenii Necnon Virtutis Cultores (As in former times foster both talent and valour)
	Lymm High, granted 15 July 1960 Escutcheon: Argent, a chevron between three cormorants sable; on a chief azure a book open proper, edged and bound, between two garbs Or. Crest: On a wreath Or and azure, : between two ostrich feathers argent a cubit arm, vested gules, charged with a pale of lozenges and cuffed also argent, the hand proper grasping a torch erect gold, enflamed also proper. Motto: Olim Meminisse Juvabit (One day, it will be a joy to remember)
	Manchester Grammar, adopted from those of founder Hugh Oldham Escutcheon: Sable, a chevron or between three owls argent, a chief or, thereon a pale between two roses gules barbed and seeded proper, the pale charged with as many keys in saltire wards upward and outward or, in front of a sword erect proper hilt and pommel or. Crest: On a wreath or and sable an owl holding in its beak and scroll argent inscribed D.O.M. in letters sable and supporting in its dexter claw a pastoral staff or. Motto: Sapere Aude (Dare to be Wise)
	The Queen's School, Chester, granted 27 February 1936 Escutcheon: Or, a rose gules; on a chief azure a mitre and a garb of the first. Crest: On a wreath of the colours, An eagle Or, wings expanded azure, holding a banner Or charged with a rose gules. Motto: Honour wisdom
	Rochdale Grammar (closed 2010), granted 20 May 1966 Escutcheon: Gules, a fleece or·; on a chief argent three keys, wards upward and to the dexter, gules. Crest: On a wreath Or, -yert and sable, A dexter cubit arm vested per pale vert and sable, cuffed Or, the hand proper grasping a cross staff argent, the cross Or, between two sprigs each of two roses gules, barbed, seeded and leaved proper, all within four fleurs-de-lys argent. Motto: Aude Et Praevalebis (Dare and you will prevail)
	Rossall, granted 20 June 1892 Escutcheon: Argent, on a pale gules between four roses of the last, a mitre Or between two open books proper. Motto: Mens Agitat Molem (Mind moves Matter)
	St Bees, adopted arms of Edmund Grindal Escutcheon: Azure, an episcopal cross-staff in pale Or, surmounted by a pallium Argent charged with four crosses formy fitchy Sable; impaling Quarterly Or and Azure, a cross quarterly Ermine and Or between four doves counterchanged of the field. Crest: Motto: Ingredere ut proficias (Enter so that you may make progress) also Expecta Dominum (Await the Lord)
	Sedbergh adopted arms of founder Roger Lupton Escutcheon: Argent, on a chevron between three wolf's heads erased sable three lilies argent on a chief gules a Tau cross between two escallops or Motto: Dura Virum Nutrix (A Stern Nurse of Men); The Tau cross was a symbol of Saint Anthony of Egypt and thus probably referred to his mastership of St. Anthony's Hospital, in the parish of St Benet Fink in the City of London. The wolves were canting references to his surname from the Latin Lupus, "a wolf", and Sable, three lillies argent, the same arrangement, is the base part of the arms of Eton College. The crest was "a wolf's head, erased"
	Sir John Deane's College, Northwich adopted at unknown date Escutcheon:
	Sir Thomas Boteler, Warrington, granted at unknown date Escutcheon: Azure, a bend Or between six covered cups of the last. Crest: Motto: Deus Spes Nostra (God is our hope)
	Stockport Grammar, granted 10 December 1962 Escutcheon: Sable, a chevron between three fusils erminois, a bordure Or. Crest: On a wreath Or and sable, An unicorn rampant Or, crined and unguled argent, resting the dexter hind leg on a book erect sable garnished gold. Motto: Vincit Qui Patitur (Those who endure will succeed)
	Stonyhurst College, granted 28 December 1953 Escutcheon: Quarterly argent and vert, in the first and fourth quarters a lion rampant guardant, and in the second and third quarters an eagle displayed, wings inverted, counterchanged; all within a bordure engrailed gules charged with eight patriarchal crosses of the first. Crest: On a wreath of the colours, A unicorn's head erased argent, armed and crined Or, gorged with a collar engrailed azure charged with three crescents ermine. Motto: Quant Je Puis (As much as I can)

== South East England ==
Image	Details
	Abingdon, granted 1 September 1998. Escutcheon: Gules a Griffin segreant Argent armed and langued Azure charged on the shoulder with a Rose Gules barbed and seeded proper all within a Bordure Argent charged alternately with three Crosses patonce and three Martlets Sable; Crest: Upon a Helm with a Wreath Argent and Gules A Griffin’s Head and a Unicorn's Head addorsed Argent both langued Azure armed and issuing from a Circlet of Teasels Or Mantled Gules doubled Argent. Motto: Misericordias domini in aeternum cantabo (I will always sing of the loving kindness of the Lord)
	Ardingly, granted 1942 Escutcheon: Azure, on a triple mount in base a Passion cross between six martlets Or; on a chief of the last, between two crosses botonnee sable, a pale engrailed gules charged with an ostrich feather erect argent. Crest: On a wreath of the colours, A pelican in her piety proper, beaked and legged Or, gorged with a collar gemel gules, the nest gold charged with a cross botonnee also gules. Motto: Beati Mundo Corde (Blessed are the pure in heart)
	All Hallows, Farnham granted 20 June 1962. Escutcheon: Argent, a cross throughout gules; surmounting the fesse point in saltire two fronds of palm vert, enfiled by a celestial crown Or; Crest: On a wreath of the colours, In front of two keys in saltire, wards upward and outward, Or, a Paschal Lamb passant reguardant proper. Motto: Testimonium perhibere veritati (Bear witness to the truth)
	Ashford, granted 20 May 1946. Escutcheon: Argent, six torches, three, two and one, sable, inflamed proper; on a chief gules, three cross crosslets fitchee of the field Crest: On a wreath of the colours, A demi unicorn argent, armed, crined and unguled Or, resting the dexter hoof on a terrestrial globe proper Motto: Esse Quam Videri (to be, rather than to seem to be) Note: The school uses as its logo an escutcheon with some features of the coat of arms
	Bennett Memorial Diocesan, Tunbridge Wells, granted 19 December 1952 Escutcheon: Vert, a brock passant proper; on a chief argent, three gilly-flowers stalked and leaved also proper. Motto: Semper Tenax (Ever holding fast)
	Bloxham, adopted from arms of school founder Philip Reginald Egerton Escutcheon: Sable a chevron between three pheons Argent; Motto: Iustorum Semita Lux Splendens (The path of the just is as a shining light)
	Bradfield, granted 16 November 1923 Escutcheon: Per chevron vert and azure, in chief two falcons jessed and belied Or and in base a saltire argent. Motto: Benedictus Es O Domine, Doce Me Statuta Tua (Blessed art thou O Lord: O teach me thy statutes)
	Brighton, granted 18 June 1920 Escutcheon: Azure, two keys in saltire Or between in fesse two pelicans vulning themselves respectant argent and in chief a closed book of the third, edged and clasped of the second. Motto: ΤΟ Δ'ΕΥ ΝΙΚΑΤΩ (Let right prevail)
	Brockenhurst, granted 20 August 1962 Escutcheon: Per chevron sable and gules, in chief two slips of oak fructed silver and in base a rose argent, barbed and seeded proper. Crest: On a wreath of the colours, In front of a burst of trees a badger resting the dexter forepaw upon an open book proper, edged and bound gules. Motto: Inter Silvas Quaerere Verum (And Seek for Truth in the Garden of Academus)
	Carmel, Wallingford, (closed 1997), granted 10 June 1963 Escutcheon: Per fesse azure and argent, in chief a seven-branched candlestick between, dexter, a stone tablet and, sinister. an open book, all Or and in base seven scrolls of the Law gules. Motto: בכל דרך דעהו (Know Him (God) in All Thy Ways)
	Charterhouse, granted 20 June 1956 Escutcheon: Or, on a chevron between three annulets gules as many crescents of the field. Motto: Deo Dante Dedi (God being the Giver) The arms are derived from those of the school's founder Thomas Sutton.
	Christ's Hospital, Horsham, adopted at unknown date Escutcheon: Argent, a cross gules, in the first quarter a sword erect of the last; on a chief azure a rose of the field, barbed and seeded proper, between two fleurs-de-lys Or. Motto: Honour All Men, Love the Brotherhood, Fear God, Honour the King. This coat of arms is also used by King Edward's School, Witley and (slightly modified) by St Thomas' Hospital
	City of London Freemen's, Ashstead, adopted arms of the City of London Crest: On a Wreath of the Colours a Dragon's sinister Wing Argent charged on the underside with a Cross throughout Gules; Escutcheon: Argent a Cross Gules in the first quarter a Sword in pale point upwards of the last Supporters On either side a Dragon Argent charged on the undersides of the wings with a Cross throughout Gules; Motto: Domine Dirige Nos (Lord, Guide Us)
	Cokethorpe, Witney, granted 1 January 2007 Escutcheon: Or on a Fess between three Peacocks in their pride proper three Lozenges Or; Crest: Upon a Helm with a Wreath Or and Azure Statant on a Rock Sableen circled by alternating Lozenges Or and the tops of Peacock Tail feathers proper an Owl affronty Or holding in the beak a Quill Pen bendwise Azure; Motto: Inopiam Ingenio Pensant (They make good their needs by their wit)
	Cranleigh formally granted in 1987 (although in use since the mid 19th century) Escutcheon: Per pale Azure and Gules; dexter six martlets Or, three two and one; sinister two keys in saltire, bows interlaced, wards upwards and inwards Or, surmounted by a sword erect Argent, pommel and hilt Or; on a base Sable a cross potent Or. Crest: Upon a Helm with a Wreath Or and Azure a Crane proper holding in the dexter foot a Torch enflamed Or; Motto: Ex Cultu Robur (From Culture comes Strength)
	Dartford Girls' Grammar, granted 20 June 1956 Escutcheon: Vert, in front of a fess wavy Argent charged with two barrulets wavy Azure a horse rampant also argent; on a chief of the last between two open books Proper [edged Or, bound Gules] a pale Murrey charged with a torch Or. Crest: On a wreath Argent and Vert, A pomme, thereon a fess wavy Argent charged with a bar wavy Azure; over all a horse as in the Arms.
	Douai (closed 1999), granted 25 September 1929 Escutcheon: Azure, three representations of the crown of St. Edmund, King and Martyr, Or; on a chief engrailed of the last an abbot's mitre between two fieurs-de-lys of the field. Motto: Dominus Mihi Adiutor (The Lord is my helper)
	Dover, granted 30 January 1931 Escutcheon: Sable, a cross argent between four leopards' faces Or; on a chief of the last the castle with two towers of the field between two open books argent, edged gold bound gules. Crest: On a wreath of the colours, A demi man (representing St. Martin) habited as a Roman soldier, holding in his dexter hand a sword with which he divides his cloak, flowing from his shoulders and supported by his sinister hand, all proper. Motto: Non Recuso Laborem (I do not refuse the task)
	Eastbourne, granted 21 January 1933. Escutcheon: Azure, on a cross argent a rose gules; in the first quarter a stag's head caboshed of the second. Crest: On a wreath of the colours, In front of an open book proper a stag's head as in the Arms. Motto: Ex Oriente Salus (The haven [the bourne] from the East)
	Epsom, granted 7 June 1910 Escutcheon: Per pale Azure and Sable, three fleurs-de-lis Or; on a chief of the last an open book Proper inscribed with the words "Olim meminisse juvabit" between in the dexter a lamp and in the sinister a rod of Aesculapius Gules. Crest: On a wreath Or and Azure, In front of an eagle's head between two wings Azure, three fleurs-de-lis Or. Motto: Deo Non Fortuna (From God not from luck)
	Epsom and Ewell High, granted 1988, adopted arms of the Borough of Epsom and Ewell, with a different motto Escutcheon: Per chevron Vert and Argent, in chief two horses heads erased Or and in base as many bars wavy Azure. Motto: Sapentium Petamus (Let us seek wisdom)
	Eton, granted in 1449 by Henry VI Escutcheon: Sable, three lily-flowers argent on a chief per pale azure and gules in the dexter a fleur-de-lys in the sinister a lion passant guardant or. Motto: Floreat Etona (May Eton Flourish) Eton College was dedicated to the Virgin Mary, and the lilies, emblem of purity, were her flower. The three lilies also link to the Holy Trinity, as well as symbolising growth and, as stated in the college's charter being "the brightest flowers redolent of every kind of knowledge". The chief shows the French fleur-de-lys and the English lion, both taken from the Royal Arms.
	Hayling, granted 20 December 1968 Escutcheon: Gules, a cross Or between four keys erect, wards to the sinister, argent, on a chief argent three roses gules, barbed and seeded proper; a bordure barry wavy argent and azure. Crest: On a wreath of the colours, In front of a rock Or, perched thereon a heron proper, four bezants. Motto: With These Keys
	Hurstpierpoint, granted 1 June 1931 Escutcheon: Per pale Argent and Ermine, dexter on a bend cottised Sable a cross couped between two martlets of the first, on a chief Gules an eagle, round the head a crown of glory, Or, sinister two wolves passant counterpassant also Gules; all within a bordure engrailed Azure. Motto: Beati Mundo Corde (Blessed are the pure in heart)
	King's, Canterbury, adopted from Canterbury cathedral Escutcheon: Azure, on a cross, argent, the letter Χ, surmounted by the letter i, sable Motto: Age dum agis (Do well what you do)
	King's, Rochester, adopted from Rochester cathedral Escutcheon: Argent, on a saltire gules an escallop Or; Motto: Disce aut discede (Learn or Depart)
	King Alfred's Academy, Wantage adopted from the traditional attributed arms of King Alfred and other Wessex kings Escutcheon: Azure, a cross flory between four [sometimes five] martlets Or; Notes: The school was founded in 1597 but adopted the name 'King Alfred' in 1849, the millenary of the latter's birth. The arms are not currently used by the school as a logo but can be seen for example on the school's war memorials.
	King Edward VI, Southampton, assumed circa 1553, confirmed 1979 Escutcheon: Quarterly 1st & 4th Azure three fleurs-de-lis two and one Or 2nd & 3rd Gules three lions passant guardant in pale Or armed and langued Azure. Crest: Upon the Royal helm the imperial crown Proper, thereon a lion statant gardant Or imperially crowned Proper. Supporters: Dexter a lion rampant gardant Or imperially crowned Proper sinister a dragon Gules. Motto: Dieu Et Mon Droit (God and my right)
	King Edward's, Witley adopted at unknown date Escutcheon: Argent, a cross gules, in the first quarter a sword erect of the last; on a chief azure a rose of the field, barbed and seeded proper, between two fleurs-de-lys Or. Motto: United by Diversity since 1553; This coat of arms is also used by Christ's Hospital and (slightly modified) by St Thomas' Hospital
	Lancing, granted 1923. Escutcheon: Argent, on a bend cotised Sable a cross couped between two martlets of the first; all within a bordure engrailed Azure; the whole surmounted of a chief Ermine thereon between two purses Or a pale of the third charged with a lily also Or. Motto: Beati Mundo Corde (Blessed are the pure in heart)
	Leighton Park, granted 1926 Escutcheon: Sable six oak leaves three two and one Or.
	Lewes Old Grammar, granted 25 October 2012 Escutcheon: Murrey within an Orle of eight Crosses crosslet Argent a Lion rampant Or holding in the forepaws a Book bound Azure the spine and the edges of the pages Gold; Motto: Floreat Lewys (May Lewes flourish)
	Licensed Victuallers', Ascot, granted 20 October 1954 Escutcheon: Vert semee of ears of barley, a swan, wings elevated, ducally gorged, a bordure invected Or. Crest: Out of a coronet composed of hop fruit proper set upon a circlet Or, a cedar tree gold. Motto: Fidelis Ad Finem (Faithful to the end)
	Lord Williams's School, Thame, Oxfordshire Escutcheon: Crest: Supporters: Motto: Sic itur ad astra a tous venaunts (Thus the way to the stars for all comers)
	Magdalen College School, Oxford, granted 1574 to Magdalen College, Oxford and also used by the school Escutcheon: Lozengy Ermine and Sable, on a Chief of the second three Lily Flowers Argent, slipped and seeded Or. Motto: Sicut Lilium (As a Lily)
	Maidstone, granted at unknown date Escutcheon: Or a Fesse wavy Azure between three Torteaux on a Chief Gules a Lion passant guardant Or; Crest: A Mural Crown Or; Motto: Olim Meminisse Juvabit (One day it will be pleasing to remember)
	New College School, arms of William of Wykeham, founder of New College, Oxford Escutcheon: Argent, two chevronels sable between three roses gules barbed and seeded proper Motto: Manners Makyth Man
	Norton Knatchbull, Ashford, adopted from arms of founder Escutcheon: Azure, in bend three Crosses-Crosslet fitchée between two Bendlets Or; Crest: Motto: Benefactorum Recordatio Jucundissima Est (Things done well make the best memories)
	Portsmouth Grammar, granted 20 March 1957 Escutcheon: Per fesse gules and sable, in chief a lion couchant and in base two Cornish choughs and a crescent, therein between the horns an estoile of eight points, all Or. Crest: On a wreath of the colours, A horse's head per fesse gules and sable, charged in base with a sun in splendour Or. Motto: Praemia Virtutis Honores (Honours are the reward of virtue)
	Ranelagh, assumed (from founder Richard Jones, 1st Earl of Ranelagh) Escutcheon: Azure a cross between four pheons Or. Crest: On a cap of maintenance Gules turned up Ermine a dexter arm embowed in armour holding an arrow all Proper. Supporters: Two griffins per fess Vert and Or. Motto: Coelitus Mihi Vires (My Strength Is From Heaven)
	Radley, granted in 1908 Escutcheon: Argent an open Book garnished Gules clasps and buckles Or thereon inscribed the words SICUT SERPENTAE SICUT COLUMBAE between three crosses pattee of the second on a Chief of the last a Key in bend sinister of the first surmounted by a similar Key in bend dexter Gold between to the dexter a Serpent nowed and erect and to the sinister a Dove both Proper. Motto: Sicut Serpentes Sicut Columbae (Be ye wise as serpents, and harmless as doves) The book (bible) is a symbol of learning. The crossed keys represent St Peter and symbolically access to higher things through learning. The college's full name is the College of St. Peter at Radley. The serpent and the dove refer to the college's motto.
	Reading Blue Coat adopted arms of founder Richard Aldworth with a later formal grant 13 August 2018. Escutcheon: Crest: Motto: Veritas Omnia Vincit (Truth Conquers All)
	Roedean, Brighton, granted 7 Dec 1921 Escutcheon: Per fesse wavy azure and argent, on a mount vert in base over a book expanded proper a roe-deer also proper, collared and chained and charged on the shoulder with a gridiron Or. Motto: Honneur aulx dignes (Honour the worthy)
	Rochester, granted or adopted on unknown date Escutcheon: Motto: Sub umbra alarum tuarum (Neath the Shade of Thy Wings)
	Royal Alexandra and Albert, Reigate, granted 11 Jun 1953 Escutcheon: Gules, a lion rampant Or; a chief of the last, thereon a fountain between two oak trees eradicated, fructed proper Motto: Nisi Dominus frustra (Without the Lord, it is in vain)
	Salesian School, Chertsey, granted 5 August 1954 Escutcheon: Per pale Or and argent, two keys addorsed in bend sinister, the bows interlaced in base, gules and azure, within an orle of six sprigs of oak fructed proper; on a chief per pale azure and gules a lily flower and a chalice gold with the Host also argent Note: This coat of arms is not currently used as a school logo.
	St Andrew's, Eastbourne, granted 4 September 1950 Escutcheon: Azure, a saltire argent surmounted in pale by a torch enflamed proper Crest: On a wreath of the colours, Two fish their heads downwards and outwards, their tails interlaced and entwined with – as many swords in saltire points downwards proper, pommels and hilts Or; Motto: ANΔPEIA (Courage)
	St Edward's, Oxford, granted 5 December 2017 Escutcheon: Azure a Cross flory between four Ancient Crowns impaling Per fess Sable and Or a Pale counterchanged in the Or an Ermine Spot Sable and in the Sable a Trefoil slipped Or the whole within a Bordure also Or. Crest: Upon a Helm with a Wreath Argent and Azure Issuant from a Cup Or a Dagger erect point downwards Argent hilt and pommel Or. Motto: Pietas Parentum (Parental devotion)
	St George's, Weybridge, adopted at unknown date Escutcheon: Argent a Cross Gules; Motto: Amore et Labore (Love and work)
	St George's, Windsor Castle, adopted at unknown date Escutcheon: Argent a Cross Gules
	St Lawrence, Ramsgate, granted 15 April 1929 Escutcheon: Gules, an open book argent, edged and surmounted by a Celestial crown or on a chief of the second an annulet between two crosses patée of the first. Crest: On a wreath of the colours, in front of two amphibanes entwined or, an escallop argent. Supporters: Two griffins per fess vert and or. Motto: In Bono Vince (Overcome Evil With Good)
	St Swithun's, Winchester, granted 9 June 1936 Escutcheon: Azure on a pale between two Keys ward upwards and outwards or a representation of St. Swithun of the first. Crest: On a Wreath of the Colours a Lion rampant or supporting with the forepaws a Key ward upwards Azure and resting the dexter hind leg on a Hurt. Motto: Caritas Humilitas Sinceritas (Charity, Humility, Sincerity )
	Shiplake, granted 20 September 1962 Escutcheon: Azure, a chevron gules fimbriated argent, between in chief two Viking ships, pennons flying, Or, sails set silver, and in base a pair of scales gold. Crest: On a wreath tenne, azure and gules, in front of the battlements of a tower sable, an owl proper. Motto: Exemplum Docet (The Example Teaches)
	Sir Roger Manwood's, Sandwich Escutcheon: Crest: Motto: Engage, Explore, Excel
	Sir William Borlase's Grammar, Marlow Escutcheon: Crest: Motto: Te Digna Sequere (Follow things worthy of thyself)
	Sir William Nottidge School, Whitstable, granted 16 February 1953 Escutcheon: Azure, on a chevron between in chief two garbs and in base a fleece Or, an open book proper, bound gules. Crest: On a wreath of the colours, Issuant from the battlements of a tower proper, a boar's head and neck erect gules, bristled and armed Or, langued azure, and gorged with a collar erminois Note: The school is now named The Whitstable School
	Stowe, granted in 1923. Escutcheon: Quarterly indented Argent and Or, first a lion rampant Azure, second a pile Gules, third a pile Vert thereon a cross of the second bearing five torteaux, fourth three martlets of the third. Motto: Persto Et Praesto (I stand firm and I stand first)
	Summer Fields, Oxford, granted 1 July 1963 Escutcheon: Gules, two bars argent between in chief three bezants and in base three lily flowers proper. Crest: On a wreath of the colours, Upon a mount vert, in front of a port between two towers Or an ox passant gules. Motto: Mens Sana In Corpore Sano (Healthy Mind in a Healthy Body)
	Sutton Valence, Maidstone, adopted from the arms of founder William Lambe Escutcheon: Sable, on a fess Or, between three pierced cinquefoil ermine, two mullets sable Motto: My trust is in God alone
	Tonbridge, granted 16 March 1923 Escutcheon: Quarterly gules and azure, a cross fillet Or between in the first and fourth quarters a fesse raguly between three boars' heads couped argent, armed and langued azure, and in the second and third quarters three lions rampant gold. Crest: On a wreath of the colours, A boar's head erased per pale gules and sable, armed and langued azure, gorged with a coronet composed of fleurs-de-lis Or. Motto: Deus Dat Incrementum (God Giveth the Increase)
	Twyford, granted 23 January 2009 Escutcheon: Argent two Bars Azure each charged with a Barrulet Or overall a Pale Pean. Crest: A demi-Bull Pean armed and unguled Or winged Argent supporting between the legs a Saxon Long Cross Azure pommelled Or. Motto: Vince Patientia (Conquer with Patience or "It's dogged 'as done it")
	Wellington College, adopted arms of the first Duke of Wellington Escutcheon: Quarterly, I and IV gules, a cross argent, in each quarter five plates (Wellesley); II and III, Or, a lion rampant gules armed and langued azure ducally collared of the first (Cowley). Motto: Virtutis Fortuna Comes (Fortune favours the brave)
	Winchester College, assumed (adopted from the school's founder, William of Wykeham), 1382 Escutcheon: Argent, two chevronels sable, between three roses gules, seeded or, barbed vert. Motto: Manners Makyth Man

== South West England ==
Image	Details
	Allhallows, Lyme Regis, (closed 1998), granted 22 June 1950 Escutcheon: Tierce in pairle reversed gules, azure and Or, in chief a celestial crown of the third and three lilies slipped vert issuant crosswise from one stalk, the outer lilies depressed by two leaves arrondie growing from the base of the stalk also vert, and in base an otter couchant of the first. Motto: Famam Extendere Factis (Extend one's fame by deeds)
	Blundell's, Tiverton Escutcheon: Gules, two pallets Argent. Crest: A squirrel sejant. Motto: Pro Patria Populoque (For the country and the people)
	Bristol Cathedral, adopted from arms of the see of Bristol Escutcheon: Sable, three crowns paly Or
	Bristol Grammar Escutcheon: Motto: Ex Spinis Uvas (Grapes From Thorns)
	Bruton, King's, granted 2 November 1921 Escutcheon: Azure, in chief an open crown Or and in base a dolphin naiant argent. Motto: Deo Juvante (With the help of God)
	Bruton Girls (closed 2022), granted 6 September 1960 Escutcheon: Per chevron Azure and Argent in chief a sun in splendour issuant Or and in base a cross botony Vert. Crest: On a wreath Or and Azure a laurel wreath Proper enclosing an estoile irradiated Or. Motto: Follow The Gleam
	Bryanston, granted 28 January 1928 Escutcheon: Azure, issuant from the base a sun Or. Motto: Et Nova Et Vetera (Both new and old)
	Canford, granted 8 September 1924 Escutcheon: Barry wavy of six azure and argent, an oak tree eradicated and fructed proper; on a chief of the second an open book of the third. Motto: Nisi Dominus Frusta (Without the Lord all is in vain)
	Cheltenham College, granted 7 August 1896 Escutcheon: Per bend gules and sable, on a bend Or between in chief two swords in saltire proper, pommels and hilts of the second, and in base a fasces palewise of the last, a mullet of the first between two fleurs de lys of the second Crest: On a wreath Or and sable, A boar's head erased sable transfixed by a cross flory fitchy argent Supporters: On either side a wolf argent supporting between the forelegs a staff Or, flying therefrom a banner azure charged with two keys in saltire Or; Motto: Labor omnia vincit (Work Conquers All)
	Cheltenham Ladies, granted 30 January 1931. Escutcheon: Sable, on a chevron argent between in chief two martlets of the second and in base a ·daisy slipped and leaved proper, three mullets of the field Motto: Coelesti luce crescat (May she grow in Heavenly light) The garb comes from the arms of the Close family (the school was founded by Francis Close in 1884),
	Cirencester Grammar (closed 1966), granted 31 March 1958 Escutcheon: Per chevron azure and Or, a chevron between three wolves' heads erased, all counterchanged. Crest: A mural crown argent, therein in front of a mitre argent, garnished Or, a slip of two Tudor roses, barbed, seeded and leaved, proper. Motto: Dona Praesente Rape Laetus Horae (Take with joy the gifts of this moment)
	Clifton College, granted 8 April 1895 Escutcheon: Argent, a chevron between two trefoils slipped in chief and a garb in base azure; a chief gules, thereon a ducal coronet Or between two books argent, clasped and garnished gold. Motto: Spiritus Intus Alit (The spirit nourishes within)
	Dean Close School, Cheltenham Escutcheon: Gules, a chief thereon an open Bible Or with golden rays. A chevron, above two pigeons and azure garb in base gules. Motto: Verbum Dei Lucerna (God's word, a guiding light)
	Commonweal, Swindon, adopted arms of the Borough of Swindon, granted 1901 Escutcheon: Quarterly, per fesse nebuly, first, Azure, on a Pile Argent three Crescents Gules; second, Gules, three Castles Argent, one and two; third Gules, a Mitre Or; fourth Azure, a Winged Wheel Or; on a Chief Argent a Locomotive Engine Proper. Motto: Salubritas et Industria (Health and Industry)
	Katharine Lady Berkeley's, Wotton-under-Edge, Berkeley family arms adopted at unknown date Escutcheon: Gules, a chevron between 10 crosses pattée 6 in chief and 4 in base argent Motto: Non palma sine pulvere (No reward without effort)
	Marlborough Escutcheon: Book proper Deus Dat Incrementum (God gives the Increase); Motto: Virtute Studio Ludo (By Courage, Study, Play)
	Millfield, granted 9 September 1954 Escutcheon: Vert, the sails of a windmill saltirewise between four crosses bottonee argent. Crest: On a wreath argent and azure, On a mount vert a windmill gules between two branches of hawthorn proper. Motto: Molire Molendo (To succeed by grinding)
	Milton Abbey, adopted at unknown date Escutcheon: Sable, three baskets replenished with three loaves of bread argent.
	Monkton Combe Escutcheon: Azure, on a bend white three fleur de lys bendwise reversed azure, in sinister chief a book open white. Motto: Verbuum Tuum Veritas (Thy Word is Truth)
	Pate's, Cheltenham adapted from arms of school's founder Richard Pate Escutcheon: Argent, a chevron gules between three pellets, on a chief of the second as many crosses crosslet of the first Motto: Patebit tum quod Latuit (That which is hidden shall be revealed)
	Plymouth College, granted 24 September 1956 Escutcheon: Argent, a cross vert between four towers sable; a chief per pale, the dexter piece per pale gules and sable a castle of three towers argent, the sinister piece sable six bezants three two and one. Motto: Dat Deus incrementum (God gives growth)
	Poole Grammar School, adapted from the arms of Poole Borough Council. Similarly to the arms of Poole, there is some historic and current inconsistency in the tinctures used. The school uses only the shield, and a different motto to the Borough. Escutcheon: Barry wavy of eight Sable and Or a Dolphin naiant embowed Argent langued Gules on a Chief wavy of the third three Escallops of the first Motto: Finis Opus Coronat (The End Crowns The Work)
	Queen Elizabeth's Hospital, Bristol granted 1591 Escutcheon: Gules, on waves of the sea with dolphins' heads therein proper, the bow of a ship with cupola argent, garnished Or, issuant out of a port on the sinister silver, with mount vert impaling Gules, on a chevron argent three estoiles sable, in chief a martlet Or; over all on a chief azure a lion passant guardant between two fleurs-de-lis Or. Crest: On a wreath of the colours, On the stem of a tree cooped and eradicated, entwined by a serpent proper, a bird, wings endorsed, argent. Supporters: On each side a sea horse proper, ducally gorged and crined Or. Motto: Dum tempus habemus operemur bonum (Whilst we have time, let us do good)
	Rendcomb, granted 10 June 1920 Escutcheon: Gules, a griffin passant, and issuant from the dexter chief a sun Or. Crest: On a wreath of the colours, In front of a sun in splendour Or a griffin's head erased gules. Motto: Quo Lux Ducit (Where the light leads)
	Royal School, Bath (merged), granted 10 March 1952 Escutcheon: Per pale gules and azure, a fesse embattled argent between in chief a lion passant guardant Or and in base three bees also argent Motto: Dominus sapientiam dat (The Lord gives us wisdom); Note: The Royal School merged in 1998 with the Bath High School for Girls to form the Royal High School, Bath
	St Loyes (closed 2015), Exeter granted 12 January 1950 Escutcheon: Or, a chevron potent between two leopards' faces and in base an eagle displayed sable; on a chief argent between two crosses gules a Tudor rose barbed and seeded proper Crest: On a wreath of the colours, In front of a torch azure fired Or two keys in saltire of the last Supporters: On either side a shoveller close in front of an apple tree proper fructed Or; the whole resting upon a compartment gules between water also proper Motto: Ne Cede Malis (Yield not to misfortunes)
	Sherborne, adopted arms of King Edward VI Escutcheon: Three lions passant quartered with those of France (fleur-de-lys); Crest: Crown with arch, and lion Supporters: Lion (dexter) and dragon (sinister); Motto: Dieu et Mon Droit (God and My Right)
	Sherborne Girls, granted 7 July 1949 Escutcheon: Argent, on a cross gules a fleur de lys of the first, over all on the dexter a bishop's crook erect Or; on a chief azure a plate charged with a candlestick and a candle vert, enflamed proper, between two pairs of wings conjoined in lure of the third
	Sir Thomas Rich's, Gloucester, granted 23 October 1962 Escutcheon: Or, on a saltire raguly per saltire gules and azure, five cross crosslets fitchy gold. Crest: On a wreath Or and azure, A dexter arm embowed in armour, the hand gautletted proper holding a cross formy fitchy Or, the elbow enfiled of a mural crown gold. Motto: Garde Ta Foy (Keep the Faith)
	Warminster, adapted from arms of founder Thomas Thynne Escutcheon: Motto: J'ay Bonne Cause (I have good cause)
	Wellington School, granted 2 November 1926 Escutcheon: Sable, an open book proper, edged and clasped Or and inscribed with the words 'Nisi Dominus frustra'; on a chief Or, between two dragons rampant combatant, a pale gules charged with a cross argent, in each canton five plates in saltire Motto: Nisi Dominus Frustra (Without the Lord, our efforts are in vain)
	Wells Cathedral, adopted from diocese of Bath and Wells Escutcheon: Azure, a saltire per saltire quarterly counterchanged Or and argent Motto: Esto Quod Es (Be What You Are)
	Westonbirt, granted 20 August 1960 Escutcheon: Per chevron gules and argent, in chief a slip of White Amaryllis flowers leaved proper, and a Catherine Wheel also argent, and in base a cedar tree eradicated also proper; on a chief of the second between two greyhounds' heads erased sable, an open book likewise proper, bound gules, edged and clasped Or, thereon the words Te Deum Laudamus in letters also sable. Motto: Bono Malum Superate (Overcome evil with good)
	Wycliffe, Stroud, granted 30 September 1931 Escutcheon: Quarterly sable and gules, a griffin issuant between two crescents [in pale] Or. Crest: On a wreath of the colours, Within a circlet of eight crescents sable, a griffin passant Or. Motto: Bold And Loyal

== West Midlands ==
Image	Details
	Abbey, Malvern (closed in 1979), granted 9 April 1954 Escutcheon: Or, a chevron gobony argent and gules between three sprigs of hazel, fructed, slipped and leaved proper. Crest: On a wreath of the colours, A unicorn's head argent, armed and crined gules, holding in the mouth a sprig of hazel, fructed, slipped and leaved proper. Motto: Ora, labora, lude (Pray, work, play); Note: Abbey School Malvern Hills closed in 1979. The premises are now occupied by Abbey College who have a new emblem
	Bablake, adopted arms of benefactor Thomas Weatley Escutcheon: Sanguine a Lion Rampant Argent, on a Chief Or, Three Mullets of the second Motto: Spiritus Vicis (The Spirit of Opportunity)
	Bromsgrove, adopted from arms of founder Thomas Cookes Escutcheon: Argent, two chevronels azure, between six martlets three, two and one gules, an inescutcheon of Ulster; Crest: Out of a mural crown Or, an arm in armour embowed proper, holding a short sword in bend argent, hilt and pommel Or; Motto: Deo, regi, vicino (For God, for King, for Neighbour)
	Denstone, adopted arms of the see of Lichfield Escutcheon: Per pale gules and argent, a cross potent and quadrate between four crosses patée all counterchanged Motto: Lignvm crvcis arbor scientiae (The wood of the cross is the tree of knowledge)
	Edgbaston High, granted 25 July 1961 Escutcheon: Argent, a pale per pale indented throughout azure and Or between two laurel branches proper. Crest: On a wreath argent and vert, A distaff erect between two martins, the dexter contourne proper. Motto: Fideliter Fortiter Feliciter (Faithfully, Bravely, Cheerfully )
	Ellesmere, granted 12 April 1954 Escutcheon: Per chevron purpure and Or, two celestial crowns fesswise of the last, in chief a cross flory also gold, in base a raven proper holding in the beak a golden annulet. Crest: On a wreath of the colours, Standing on a mount vert a raven as in the Arms. Motto: Pro Patria Dimicans (Striving for one's country)
	Hereford Cathedral, adopted arms of the Dean of Hereford Cathedral Escutcheon: Or five chevronels Azure; Motto: Floreat Schola Herefordensis (May the school of Hereford flourish)
	King Edward's Birmingham, adopted arms of King Edward VI Crest: Crown with arch, and lion Escutcheon: Three lions passant quartered with those of France (fleur-de-lys); Supporters: Lion (dexter) and dragon (sinister); Motto: Dieu et Mon Droit (God and My Right)
	King Edward VI School, Lichfield, derived from the civic arms of Lichfield Escutcheon: Chequey of nine Or a Chevron Gules and Ermine; Motto: Deo Patriae Scholae (For God, Country, and School)
	King Edward VI College, Stourbridge, adopted arms of King Edward VI Escutcheon: Quarterly, I and IV: Azure three fleurs-de-lis Or; II and III: Gules three lions passant guardant in pale Or, armed and langued Azure; Motto: Honi soit qui mal y pense (Shame on him who thinks evil of it)
	Lucton, adopted from the 'Pierrepont' arms. (School founder was a John Pierrepont) Escutcheon: Argent semée of cinquefoils gules, a lion rampant sable Motto: Floreat Luctona (May Lucton flourish)
	Malvern, granted 16 August 1926 Escutcheon: Or, five torteaux between two chevronels gules, all between three fountains. Crest: On a wreath Or and gules, A griffin sejant supporting a weather vane sable. Motto: Sapiens Qui Prospicit (The one who is wise looks ahead)
	Oswestry, adopted arms of the school founder David Holbache Escutcheon: Argent, a chevron engrailed sable Motto: Non scholae, sed vitae discimus (We Learn Not For School But For Life)
	Royal Grammar School Worcester, granted 24 July 1961 Escutcheon: Gules, an ancient crown Or, on a chief argent three pears sable Crest: On a wreath of the colours, In front of the battlements of a castle triple towered argent, masoned sable, a Roman lamp Or, inflamed gules Motto: Respice et prospice (Remember the Past and Look to the Future)
	Royal School, Wolverhampton, granted 8 May 1946 Crest: Issuant from a crown palisado Or, between two keys in saltire, wards upwards and outwards, a torch erect sable, fired proper. Mantled gules, doubled Or Escutcheon: Azure, on a chevron argent between three bezants, a cross patee gules; all within a bordure Or charged with three Stafford knots gules Motto: Nisi Dominus frustra (Without God, it is in vain)
	Rugby, granted 9 March 1932 Escutcheon: Azure, on a fesse engrailed between three griffins' heads erased Or, a fleur de-lys of the first between two roses gules, barbed and seeded proper; a bordure of the second Motto: Orando Laborando (By praying, By working)
	St Dominic's Grammar, adopted at unknown date Escutcheon: Gyronny of eight azure and or, a cross flory counterchanged Motto: Veritas (Truth); Note: the school has adopted the coat of arms of the Dominican Order but changed colours from black and white (sable and argent) to blue and gold (azure and or)
	Shrewsbury, adopted arms of King Edward VI Crest: Crown with arch Escutcheon: Three lions passant quartered with those of France (fleur-de-lys); Motto: Intus Si Recte Ne Labora (If all is right within, trouble not)
	Solihull, adopted 1882 Escutcheon: Quarterly, first, Argent, a fesse and in chief two mullets gules; second, Azure, a chevron between three lions passant or; third, Ermine, on each of two bars humetty gules, three escallop shells argent: fourth Argent, a fesse gules between two greyhounds courant proper. Motto: Perseverantia (By perseverance) The coat of arms is made up of quarters each being the arms of school founders and sponsors Thomas Dabridgecourt, Thomas Greswold, William de Odingsells and Thomas Waring.
	Sunfield Children's Home, granted 1 October 1990 Escutcheon: Vert in dexter chief a Sun in Splendour and in base two Bars triple arched. Crest: Upon a Mount of New Red Sandstone in front of an Oak grove proper a representation of the Folly known as Clent Castle Argent rising above the battlements thereof a Sun Gold. Supporters: Standing on a mound of New Red Sandstone proper on the dexter side a Wolf and on the sinister side a Goat both Argent the latter armed unguled and bearded Or. Motto: In God's Light We Stand
	Thomas Adams School, Wem, Shropshire, adopted arms of founder Thomas Adams Escutcheon: Ermine, three cats-a-mountain in pale azure; in the dexter chief a canton [or inescutcheon] argent, charged with a sinister hand, couped at the wrist, gules. Crest: On a wreath of the colours, a wolf’s head, erased, ermine. Motto: Sub cruce veritas (Truth under the cross)
	Warwick, 7 September 1931 Escutcheon: Gules, a cross flory in the first quarter a Fleur-de-lys Or, on a chief of the second three martlets Azure. Crest: On a wreath Or and Gules, upon a portcullis chained Or a bear erect Argent muzzled Gules supporting a ragged staff also Argent. Motto: Altoria Peto (I Aim At Higher Things) The three azure (blue) martlets are heraldic swallows, depicted without feet because of a medieval belief that they could not perch on the ground and are often found as a representation of effort in arms of educational establishments. Like the large golden cross, they are emblems used by King Edward the Confessor, reputed to be one of the original founders of the school. The gold fleur-de-lys and portcullis are emblems of King Henry VIII, who re-founded the school in 1545, and the Bear and Ragged Staff have been the crest of the family of the Earl of Warwick since at least the 14th century.
	Wolverhampton Girls' High, granted 15 August 1962 Escutcheon: Gules, a cross formy throughout, interlaced by a Stafford knot Or, all between four towers argent each charged with an ermine spot sable. Crest: On a wreath of the colours, Between two wings, a triangle, point downward, Or. Motto: Ludus Supra Praemium (Playing the game is more important than the prize)
	Wolverhampton Grammar, adopted from arms of founder Stephen Jenyns Escutcheon: Argent, a chevron Gules between three plummets Sable. Crest: Motto: Schola Wulfrunhantunenses (Wolverhampton School)
	Wrekin, granted 26 February 1951 Escutcheon: Azure, a lion rampant Or; on a canton of the last a sprig of bay slipped proper. Crest: On a wreath of the colours, within a chaplet of bay proper a lion rampant Or. Motto: Aut Vincere Aut Mori (Either to conquer or to die)

== Yorkshire & the Humber ==
Image	Details
	Ackworth, Pontefract, granted 15 December 1959 Escutcheon: Azure, on a chevron argent between three acorns slipped also argent, a chevron sable, thereon as many roses likewise argent, barbed and seeded proper. Crest: Issuant from a coronet composed of four roses argent, barbed and seeded proper, set upon a rim Or, a mount vert, thereon a lamb statant, in the mouth a sprig of thyme, leaved and flowered, also proper. Motto: Non Sibi Sed Omnibus (Not for Self, But for All)
	Alderman Cogan's School, Hull, granted 20 December 1956. Escutcheon: Azure, two quill pens in saltire argent enfiled by a ducal coronet Or; on a chief gules, three leaves of the second. Crest: Os a wreath Or, azure and gules, A pelican's head and neck erased, the beak Or vulning the breast proper, the neck gorged with a chain Or, pendent therefrom a key, wards to the sinister, gold. Motto: Constans Fidei (Constant in faith)
	Ampleforth, granted 17 May 1921 Escutcheon: Per fesse dancette Or and azure, a chief per pale gules and of the second charged on the dexter side with two keys in saltire Or and argent and on the sinister with a cross flory between five martlets of the first. Motto: Dieu Le Ward (God the Protector)
	Archbishop Holgate's, York, granted 20 March 1950 Escutcheon: Or, a bend between two bulls' heads couped sable; on a chief per pale azure and harry of four argent and gules, a mitre of the first and a rectorial staff in bend of the third. Motto: Vincet Amor Patriae (The love of my country prevails)
	Ashville, Harrogate, granted 14 June 1933 Escutcheon: Per chevron gules and argent, a chevron ermine betweenin chief a dragon's head erased Or between two roses of the second, barbed and seeded proper, and in base issuant from a mount an ash tree also proper. Motto: Esse Quam Videri (To be rather than to seem)
	Beverley Grammar, adopted at unknown date Escutcheon: Per pale: dexter, Argent, a crozier in pale Or enfiled by a crown of the last, all within a bordure Azure charged with eight bezants; sinister, Argent, three bars wavy Azure, on a chief of the last a castor beaver reguardant, also Or. Motto: Adolescentiam alunt senectutem oblectant ([Study] sustains youth and entertains old age) Note: The arms reference the crozier of John of Beverley, the crown of Athelstan and the arms of Beverley town council
	Bootham, York, granted 29 June 1931 Escutcheon: Argent, on a cross azure a rose of the field barbed and seeded proper between four crosses patee concave also argent. Motto: Membra Sumus Corporis Magni (We are members of a greater body)
	Ermysted's Grammar, adopted at unknown date Escutcheon: Argent, a chevron Gules between three spear heads Sable; Crest: On a wreath of the colours Argent and Gules, a dexter arm in armour embowed, holding the butt end of a broken spear proper. Motto: Suivez La Raison (Follow the truth)
	Harrogate Ladies College, granted or adopted at unknown date Escutcheon: Motto: Industria, Fide, Pietate (Work, Faith and Piety)
	Hymers College, Hull, granted or adopted at unknown date Escutcheon: Motto: High Merit, High Reward
	King James's, Knaresborough, granted 20 December 1966 Escutcheon: Azure, on a mount in base vert a castle of two domed towers Or, pennons flying to the sinister argent; a chief Or, thereon two [open] crowns gules. Crest: On a wreath of the colours, A demi lion gules, crowned and pendent from a chain about the neck a book Or, grasping in the dexter paw a sprig of oak vert, fructed Or. Motto: Quid Retribuam Domino (How may I repay the Lord)
	King's, Pontefract, adopted at unknown date Escutcheon:
	Normanton Grammar (closed 1977), granted 15 November 1960 Escutcheon: Paly of six Or and Azure, a Chief Gules fimbriated Gold; Crest: A demi Grey Friar affrontee proper charged on the breast with a Trefoil slipped Or and clasping in the dexter hand a Breviary also proper. Motto: Learn to be Free
	Queen Elizabeth Grammar, Wakefield, the arms have been in use since 1591, but it is unknown if or when they were granted. Escutcheon: Per fess, in the upper half parted per pale, gules a lion statant guardant or, and sable an owl argent, the lower half azure a Bible argent with clasps Or; Crest: An owl argent Motto: Turpe Nescire (It is a disgrace to be ignorant"); The golden lion in a red field relates to the royal foundation; the silver owl on black is adopted from the Savile family's coat of arms; the Bible represents the religious side of education.
	Queen Ethelburga's Collegiate, granted 1 June 1962. Escutcheon: Azure, on a chevron ermine between in the dexter chief a sun in splendour Or, and in base an eagle, wings elevated, respecting the same, three ancient crowns gold Crest: Out of a coronet composed of eight ostrich feathers set upon a rim argent, a mount vert, thereon a falcon also argent, armed, belied an.d jessed Or, wings elevated per chief dancetty Or and azure Motto: Luce magistra (With the light as my teacher)
	Ripon Grammar, adopted at unknown date Escutcheon: Crest: Motto: Giorne ymb lare y diowatdomas (Eager to learn and seek after righteousness)
	Queen Ethelburga's Collegiate, granted 1 June 1962. Escutcheon: Azure, on a chevron ermine between in the dexter chief a sun in splendour Or, and in base an eagle, wings elevated, respecting the same, three ancient crowns gold Crest: Out of a coronet composed of eight ostrich feathers set upon a rim argent, a mount vert, thereon a falcon also argent, armed, belied an.d jessed Or, wings elevated per chief dancetty Or and azure Motto: Luce magistra (With the light as my teacher)
	St Peter's, York, granted 23 July 1953 Escutcheon: Azure, a key in bend, ward upwards, Or surmounting a like key in hend sinister argent, between in chief an ancient crown of the second and three double roses, two in fesse, and one in base, also argent, barbed and seeded proper. Crest: On a wreath of the colours, An ancient tiara, the cap argent, the crown and mound gold. Motto: Super Antiquas Vias (Upon the Ancient Ways)
	Scarborough College, granted 20 December 1963 Escutcheon: Per chevron enarched azure and sable, in chief a sun issuant Or and in base a dolphin haurient argent. Crest: On a wreath argent and vert, Perched on a mural crown gules, an owl proper between two sprigs of laurel vert. Mantled vert, doubled Or. Motto: Pensez fort (Think boldly)
	Silcoates, Wrenthorpe, Wakefield, granted 1 December 1924 Escutcheon: Or, on a chevron between in chief two roses and in base a phoenix gules, an open book between two roses argent; on a chief wavy azure a three masted sailing ship in full sail of the fourth. Motto: Clarior Ex Ignibus (Brighter out of the Flames)
	Wakefield Girls' High, granted 10 January 1963. Escutcheon: Per chevron Sable and Azure, in chief two leopards' faces and in base a fleur-de-lys Or; a bordure Ermine. Crest: On a wreath Or, Azure, Argent and Sable, An owl Argent, crowned with an ancient crown Or, standing within a chaplet of leaves Proper and roses silver, barbed and seeded Proper, and between two pens Azure, the quills gold. Motto: Each For All And All For God

== See also ==
- Armorial of schools in the United Kingdom
- Armorial of British universities
- The Armorial Register
- Heraldry
