= Wilfrid Scott-Giles =

English genealogist

Charles Wilfrid (or Wilfred) Scott-Giles (24 October 1893 – 1982) was an English writer on heraldry and an officer of arms, who served as Fitzalan Pursuivant Extraordinary.

== Life ==
Charles Wilfrid Giles was born in Southampton on 24 October 1893, the son of Charles Giles, sometime Chairman of the Parliamentary Press Gallery. He was educated at Emanuel School in Battersea in London, and served in the First World War in the Royal Army Service Corps. Between 1919 and 1922 he read history at Sidney Sussex College, Cambridge. He then worked on the parliamentary staff of the Press Association before being appointed as secretary of the Institution of Municipal and County Engineers in 1928. In 1946 he became secretary of the Public Works and Municipal Services Congress and Exhibition Council.

In July 1928 he assumed the surname "Scott-Giles" by deed poll.

He became a leading authority on heraldry, and wrote a number of books and articles on the subject. He was credited by John Brooke-Little as initiator of the concept and name of The White Lion Society.

He also wrote the standard histories of his old school, Emanuel, and of his old college, Sidney Sussex.

== Publications ==
His heraldic publications included:

- The Romance of Heraldry (1929)
- Civic Heraldry of England and Wales (1933, 2nd edition 1953)
- Shakespeare's Heraldry (1950)
- Boutell's Heraldry (2nd revised edition) (1954)
- The siege of Caerlaverock rendered into rime (1960)
- Heraldry in Westminster Abbey (1961)
- Motley Heraldry (1962)
- Looking at Heraldry (1967)

Other works included:

- The History of Emanuel School (1935; later editions, revised and supplemented by other authors, 1948, 1966, 1977)
- Sidney Sussex College: a short history (1951; revised edition 1975)
- The Wimsey Family: A Fragmentary History Compiled from Correspondence With Dorothy L. Sayers (Gollancz, 1977). In another association with Sayers, Scott-Giles prepared the diagrams and maps illustrating Sayers' translation of Dante's Divine Comedy.

== Honours and appointments ==
Scott-Giles was appointed an Officer of the Order of the British Empire in 1953, and in 1957 became Fitzalan Pursuivant of Arms Extraordinary. In 1970 he was awarded the Julian Bickersteth Memorial Medal by the trustees and council of the Institute of Heraldic and Genealogical Studies.

Following his retirement he settled in Cambridge, where he was made a Fellow-Commoner of his old college, Sidney Sussex.

== Arms ==
Coat of arms of Wilfrid Scott-Giles
Adopted 1936 Crest On a torse argent & gules issuing from a circular chain square-linked or a demi-swan rousant the head lowered proper. Escutcheon Ermine, a cross double parted & fretted gules interlaced with an annulet or. Motto Strive and Thrive
