= Georgiana Buller =

British hospital administrator

Dame Georgiana Buller DBE RRC
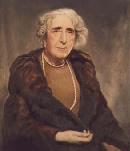
- Born: Audrey Charlotte Georgiana Buller; 4 August 1884; Crediton, Devon, England
- Died: 22 June 1953 (aged 68); Exeter, Devon, England
- Known for: Founder of St Loye's Foundation
- Parent(s): General Sir Redvers Buller; Lady Audrey Buller, née Townshend

Dame Audrey Charlotte Georgiana Buller DBE RRC (4 August 1884 – 22 June 1953) was a British hospital administrator and the founder of the first school dedicated to occupational therapy in the United Kingdom.

Buller was born in Crediton, Devon, the only daughter of General Sir Redvers Buller and his wife, Lady Audrey, youngest daughter of the 4th Marquess Townshend. She joined the British Red Cross Society and by the outbreak of the First World War in 1914 she was Deputy County Director of the Voluntary Aid Organisation for Devon. She was asked to establish a hospital in Exeter; by August 1915 the original 160 beds had grown to over 1,400.

Established as the Red Cross Voluntary Aided Hospital, in 1915 it was taken over by the War Office as the Central Military Hospital Exeter and Buller remained as administrator, the only woman to hold such a post in a major military hospital during the war. She was also responsible for forty-four affiliated auxiliary hospitals. By 1918 more than 35,000 patients had passed through the hospital. For her work she was appointed Dame Commander of the Order of the British Empire (DBE) in the 1920 civilian war honours and also awarded the Royal Red Cross 1st Class (RRC).

After the war, Buller began collecting funds to establish an orthopaedic hospital for children in Devon. In 1927 she opened the Princess Elizabeth Orthopaedic Hospital in Exeter. In 1937 this was followed by the St Loye's Training Centre for Cripples (which later became St Loye's College for Training the Disabled and is now St Loye's Foundation), also in Exeter. In 1932 she opened the Cripple's Training College (which later became Queen Elizabeth's Training College and is now Queen Elizabeth's Foundation for Disabled People), which is based in Leatherhead, Surrey. She also founded the British Council for Rehabilitation.

She was an early disability rights pioneer, and often spoke on the subject of disability with great passion and eloquence:

Normality! This is the goal to which every disabled individual, without exception, passionately aspires and which all, in their degrees, can achieve if given the right encouragement and opportunity.

‘In nature there’s no blemish but the mind. None can be called deformed but the unkind.’

Shakespeare, with the perception of a poet, saw to the heart of the problem long before the word ‘rehabilitation’ was added to the English Language. Few of us are without handicaps of one sort or another – moral, psychological, physical. The last category may often be less hampering than either of the others, and those who suffer from them have as good a claim as their fellows to be regarded as ordinary human beings, neither to be recognized nor over-indulged nor segregated. Until this fact is recognized by the community as a whole, legislation, however comprehensive and well designed, will not give to the disabled the status which should be theirs as much for the benefit of the nation generally as for their own.

Buller died at her home at Bellair House in Exeter from cancer in 1953, aged 68. She never married and had no children.
