= Committee on Heraldry of the New England Historic Genealogical Society =

- The coat of arms of the Committee.
- Founded: 1864
- Type: Heraldry society
- Location: Boston, Massachusetts, US
- Coordinates: 42.3518°N 71.0753°W
- Region served: United States
- Services: Heraldic registration and recording
- Fields: Heraldry
- Chairman: Ryan J. Woods
- Parent organization: New England Historic Genealogical Society
- Website: www.committeeonheraldry.org

The Committee on Heraldry of the New England Historic Genealogical Society, established in 1864, is the world's oldest non-governmental body primarily concerned with heraldry.

== Purpose ==
The committee was charged, on 3 February 1864, by the council of the New England Historic Genealogical Society "to collect and preserve information in regard to heraldry" and to otherwise deal with all matters to do with the subject for the society.

== Roll of Arms ==
The committee authenticates and registers coats of arms rightfully borne by "American colonists, or immigrants to the United States, who were rightfully armigerous according to the authorities and customs of their countries of origin, or those already resident here during colonial times who were granted arms by such authorities", publishing these historic arms in their Roll of Arms. Only historic arms dating from before 1900 are published in this Roll of Arms. The roll itself is published in pamphlets called parts, the first of which was published in 1928; but each segment of the roll also appears in an issue of The New England Historical and Genealogical Register.

The committee illustrates the published Roll of Arms with only the escutcheons or shield of arms for the registration. However, in the text of the Roll of Arms the full achievement, and other related matters are discussed.

In 2013 the Committee on Heraldry published a one-volume edition of the complete Roll of Arms to date (registrations 1–741), edited and with a historical introduction and notes by the committee's secretary at the time, Henry L. P. Beckwith.

One need not be entitled to the arms in order to apply for their registration. Genealogists and others often apply to register arms having nothing to do with their own ancestry purely to put them on record with the committee.

The first entry in the Roll of Arms, the coat of arms of John Washington, the great-grandfather of George Washington

The second entry in the Roll of Arms, the coat of arms of Samuel Appleton (1625–1696), an ancestor of Samuel Appleton.

The thirtieth entry in the Roll of Arms, the coat of arms of Percival Lowell, of the Boston Brahmin Lowell family.

== Recording of modern and assumed arms ==
As of 1933, the Committee on Heraldry has also recorded coats of arms which are not eligible for inclusion in the above Roll of Arms. At that time, the committee began recording assumed arms (arms created and used in colonial or recent times without formal sanction by a government heraldic authority). In 1972, the committee no longer included in their Roll of Arms any arms granted in the 20th century to the use of Americans by foreign heraldic authorities; these also are now recorded separately.

== History ==
The committee's 1899 and 1914 reports on heraldry are considered two of the key documents in the history of United States Heraldry.

== Committee Members ==
Committee members serve an indefinite term and many serve for life. Members of the committee as of October 1, 2024:

- Ryan J. Woods, Chair
- Nathaniel Lane Taylor, Registrar
- Joseph McMillan, Corresponding Secretary
- Bertram Lippincott III, Corporate Secretary
- Julian V. Brandt
- Brady Brim-DeForest
- Christopher C. Child
- John Blythe Dobson
- Peter O'Donoghue, York Herald, College of Arms
- John Shannon
- D. Brenton Simons

Prominent past members include Harold Bowditch, Henry Ernest Wood, and Robert Dickson Weston.

== See also ==
- United States heraldry
- Heraldry societies
- The Heraldry Society
- Heraldry Society of Scotland
- Royal Heraldry Society of Canada
- Royal Belgian Genealogical and Heraldic Office
- International Register of Arms
