= Heraldry Society of Southern Africa =

Heraldic society

The Heraldry Society of Southern Africa (HSSA) was founded in Cape Town on 27 August 1953. It has not been active since 2007, but as it has not been wound up it is, in effect, in suspense.

== Activities ==
The HSSA's main activity was regular meetings and lectures.

In its early years, the HSSA also took an active role in promoting good heraldic practice in South Africa, as there was no official heraldry authority in the country at that time, the HSSA provided a design and advice service, with particular emphasis on municipal arms. The HSSA also acted as unofficial liaison with the College of Arms in London, through the then Chester Herald, who was an HSSA member.

The HSSA staged the first heraldry exhibition in South Africa, "Heraldry at the Cape", in 1956.

== Publications ==
The HSSA published a regular Newsletter from 1953 to 1958. This was replaced with a quarterly journal named Arma, in 1958.

== President and chairmen ==
During the 54 years that it was active, the HSSA had only five chairmen:

- Colin Graham Botha: 1953-54
- Frank Waller: 1954-1957
- Dr Cornelis Pama: 1957-1994
- Robert Laing: 1994-2002
- Frederick Brownell: 2002-

C. Graham Botha was honorary life president from 1954 until his death in 1973.

== See also ==
- South African heraldry
- Heraldry societies
- Heraldry Society (disambiguation)
- Southern African Vexillological Association
