= White Lion Society =

British organisation

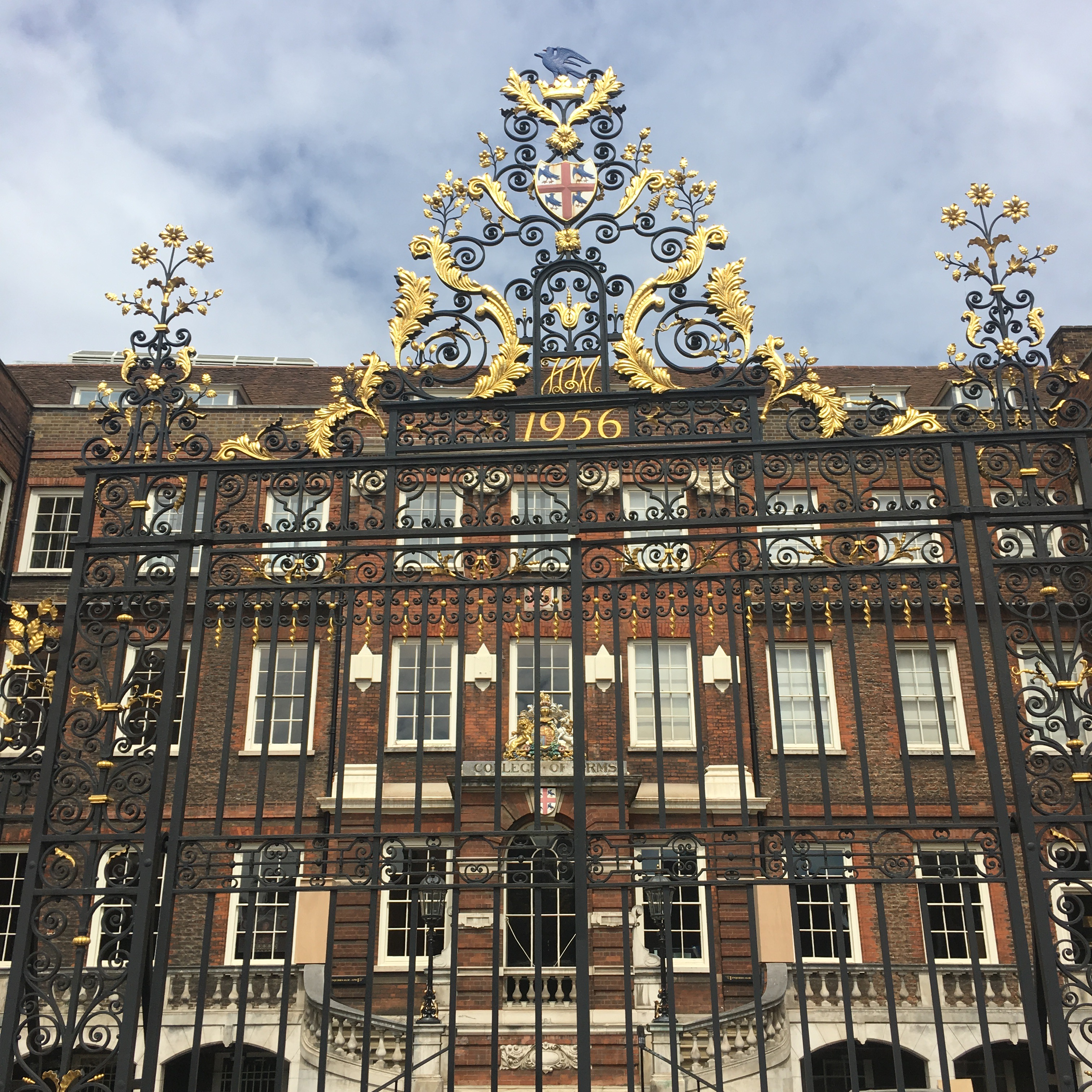
College of Arms

The White Lion Society was founded in 1986 as a society to benefit the College of Arms through donations of useful items and publications. John Brooke-Little, while Norroy and Ulster King of Arms, was integral to the foundation of the Society. In 1984, at a meeting of The Heraldry Society, it was suggested to Brooke-Little that it would be appropriate to found a "Society of Friends" of the College of Arms. Brooke-Little explained that the late Charles Wilfrid Scott-Giles, Fitzalan Pursuivant of Arms Extraordinary, had previously suggested the same idea, giving it the notional name of The White Lion Society after the heraldic supporters of the College of Arms being two white lions taken from the Earl Marshal's Mowbray Supporters. Brooke-Little put the idea before the Chapter of the college shortly after and with its approval, the Society came into being in 1986.
