= Polish Nobility Association =

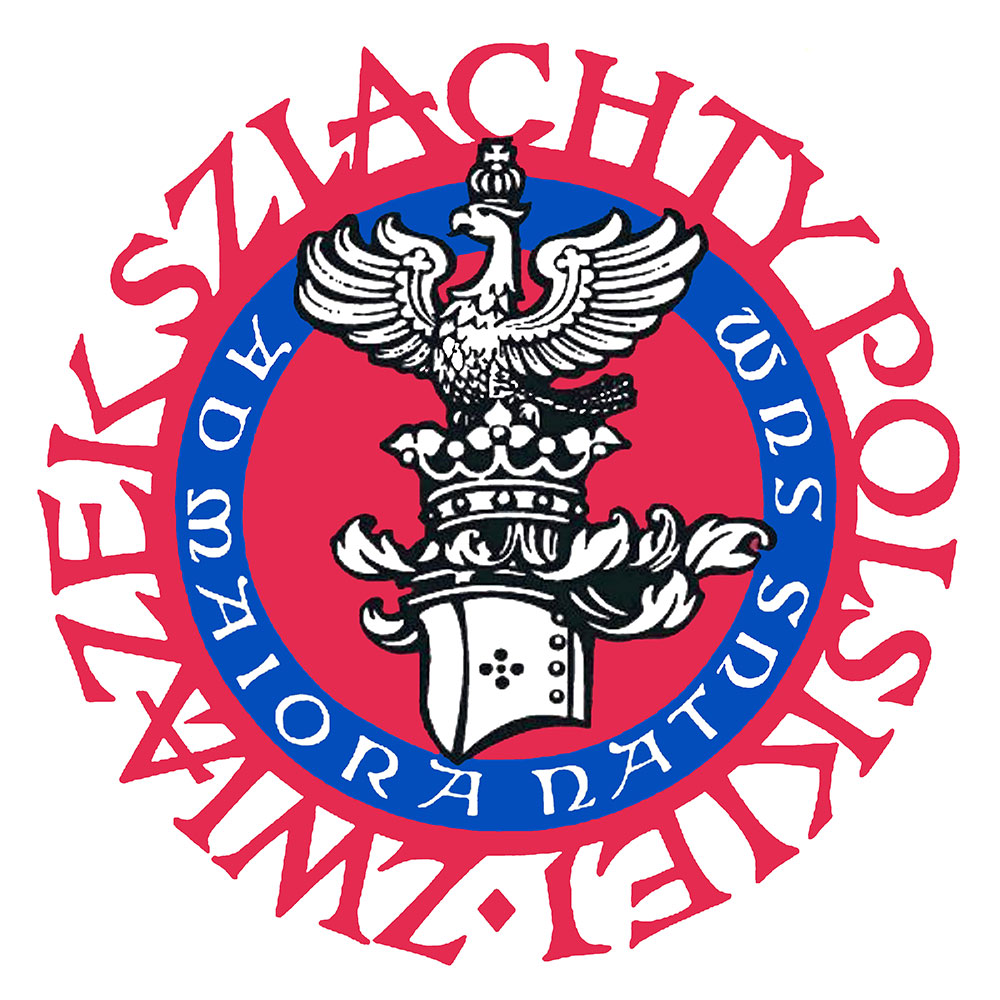
- The logo of the association
- Abbreviation: PNA (Polish: ZSzP)
- Formation: 1995
- Legal status: Association
- Headquarters: Warsaw, Poland
- Location: ul. Żurawia 43 lok. 116, 00-680 Warsaw, Poland
- Coordinates: 52.22764°N 21.01190°E
- Region served: Poland
- Members: private persons, families
- Official language: Polish, English
- President: Marcin Witold Forkiewicz
- Main organ: The Main Board
- Website: PNA

The Polish Nobility Association (PNA) (Polish: Związek Szlachty Polskiej, ZSzP) – is a sociocultural organization, registered in 1995 in Gdańsk. The association aims to integrate the nobility of the once Polish–Lithuanian Commonwealth, take care of cultural monuments of the nobles, popularize the history and traditions of the Polish nobility, szlachta, and promote the ethos of chivalry.

== Basic information ==
The association is legally recognized, as the statute was affirmed by the Regional Court Gdańsk-Północ on 16 February 2006. The current association headquarters is located in the capital city of Warsaw, Poland.

To become a member of the association, one has to be of noble origin in the male line, i.e., to be a son or daughter of a male noble.

The association cooperates with other such organizations in the country and abroad such as: the Institute Saint Georges pour la Noblesse from France, the Institute Fernando el Catolico from Zaragoza in Spain, the Russian Noble Assembly from Moscow, the Confederation of the Belarusian Nobility from Minsk, and many others. In Poland, PNA cooperates with independent family organizations, supporting and promoting their activities. PNA continuously cooperates with the Polish branch of the Sovereign Military Order of Malta, with the foundation Pomoc Maltańska, with the Polish Landed Gentry Society and with the Polish Heraldry Society, of which some of the members are genealogy experts for the association.

The association doesn't grant titles of nobility or titles of aristocracy and it doesn't cooperate with organizations which it considers to be usurpatory, pseudo-aristocratic, pseudo-monarchistic or pseudo-military orders.

The association's magazine, Verbum Nobile, first publication was in 1992 and is still being published up to this day. The magazine's Registration No. in Press Registry: 296, ISSN: 1230-4573. To date, (August 2010) there have been 15 issued publications, including 2 double volume publications. This magazine is focused on the broader themes of the nobility – the tradition, culture, history (including heraldry and genealogy), as well as current affairs and its contents deemed important to the members and supporters of the organization.

== Local chapters ==
The association has its local branches in the following cities: Białystok, Gdańsk, Kraków, Szczecin, Toruń, Warsaw, Wrocław.

Regional representatives of the association play an important role in the organization. Currently PNA has its permanent representatives in Ciechanów, Łomża, Olsztyn, Ostrów Mazowiecka, Płock, Przemyśl, Szczecin; abroad in Lithuania, Canada, in Germany, in Sweden and in the United Kingdom.

== Major initiatives and achievements ==
- since 1995 the organization of a series of lectures, symposia and scientific sessions on the history, traditions and culture of the nobles in Poland;
- support of local cultural initiatives, for example, in 2009 the chapter of PNA in Białystok founded a special award in the category of soloists in the X International Moniuszko Competition "Evening Song" in Białystok;
- contacts with Poles abroad (including the donation of books and copies of the magazine Verbum Nobile to the Polish community – individuals and organizations that have asked for such support);
- the delegation of the association participates in the celebration of national holidays (for example, representatives of the association on Polish Independence Day placing bouquets at the Tomb of the Unknown Soldier).

== Sources ==
- The Official Website of the Polish Nobility Association
- National Court Register registration number 0000102686
- Lenczewski, T. (2010) Szlachta polska po 1918 r. – aspekt prawny i organizacje, „Pro Fide Rege et Lege” 45/2003, pages 16–21.
