= Cornelis Pama =

Dutch heraldist and genealogist (1916 - 1994)

- Born: 5 November 1916; Rotterdam
- Died: 23 October 1994 (aged 77)
- Occupations: Dutch bookseller, publisher, heraldist and genealogist
- Known for: Honorary doctorate in philosophy; Founded the journal Nederlands Archief voor Genealogie en Heraldiek; Chairman of the Heraldry Society of Southern Africa

Cornelis Pama (1916–1994) was a Dutch bookseller, publisher, heraldist and genealogist, who spent the second half of his life in South Africa.

He was born in Rotterdam. During World War II, when the Netherlands were under German occupation, he was conscripted for forced labour in Germany. After the war, he moved to England, where he lived until emigrating to South Africa in 1955. He spent the rest of his life there.

Pama was awarded an honorary doctorate in philosophy by a Belgian university in 1963.

== Heraldry ==
Pama is probably best known as a heraldist and genealogist, in both the Netherlands and South Africa. He was a prolific writer in both countries.

=== Netherlands ===
Pama founded the journal Nederlands Archief voor Genealogie en Heraldiek in 1935. His Netherlands publications included several editions of Rietstap's Handboek der Wapenkunde (1943 - 1987), Heraldiek en Ex-Libris (1943), Het Volkskarakter in de Heraldiek (1943), Ons Familiewapens (1943) and Prisma van de Heraldiek en Genealogie (1990).

=== South Africa ===
In 1956, Pama served on a committee of enquiry which investigated the requirements for a national heraldry authority. From 1959 to 1963, he was consultant to the government's new Heraldry Section (headed by Dr Coenraad Beyers), and in that capacity he designed official insignia for the new Republic of South Africa in 1961 : the state president's sash of office and official flag, a new mace for the House of Assembly, and a new Black Rod for the Senate. From 1963 to 1989, he was a member of the Heraldry Council. In 1993, he served on the Commission for National Symbols, which was tasked with designing a new national flag and coat of arms (but whose recommendations were not accepted).

Pama was chairman of the Heraldry Society of Southern Africa from 1957 until his death. He also edited the society's journal Arma from 1977. He was a founder member of the Genealogical Society of South Africa in 1964, edited its journal Familia from 1964, and served a term as its chairman.

Pama designed coats of arms and flags for dozens of schools, corporate bodies, municipalities, and private individuals. They included the Milnerton, Clanwilliam, Malmesbury and Brackenfell municipalities, the Conradie Hospital, and the Wellington Teachers Training College and its successor the Boland Teachers College. He also designed the seal of the General Synod of the Dutch Reformed Church in South Africa.

His South African publications included Heraldiek in Suid-Afrika (1956), Die Unievlag (1957), Die Wapens van die Ou Afrikaanse Families (1959), Simbole van die Unie (1960), Lions and Virgins (1965), Heraldry of South African Families (1972), Die Vlae van Ons Land (1976), Heraldiek ABC (1980), Flags of Southern Africa (1981), Die Groot Afrikaanse Familienaamboek (1983), Vlae van Suider-Afrika (1983) and British Families in South Africa (1992). He also revised and re-published C.C. de Villiers' Geslagregisters van Ou Afrikaans Families (1966).

Pama also published a few local history works : Vintage Cape Town (1973), Regency Cape Town (1975), Bowler's Cape Town (1977), Wagon Road to Wynberg (1979) and Wine Estates of South Africa (1979).
