= Institute of Heraldic and Genealogical Studies =

The United Kingdom's Institute of Heraldic and Genealogical Studies (IHGS) was founded in 1961 at Canterbury, Kent (its current location) by Cecil Humphery-Smith. Its library was created by donations from Humphery-Smith, Aylmer Buesst and others. The Institute promotes research, study, and training in all aspects of family history, including heraldry.

Courses may be undertaken by full-time students, through a series of evening classes combined with other studies, or by a correspondence course. Those who complete approved courses may sit the diploma examination after submitting adequate evidence of practical experience. Those who hold the diploma and produce an acceptable dissertation or thesis can qualify as Licentiates of the Institute, or LHG. Students, armorists, genealogists and family historians are able to make use of the extensive collection of books and manuscripts in the Institute's library.

The research arm of the Institute, Achievements, conducts family history research on behalf of clients wishing to explore their family tree. Various research packages are available including customised reports, pedigree charts and heraldic artwork as required.

In 2024, Dr Paul A. Fox became Principal of the Institute.

== Arms ==
In 1982, armorial bearings were granted to the Institute. These are blazoned Azure a Cross patonce within an orle of eight Acorns cups inward Or.

Coat of arms of Institute of Heraldic and Genealogical Studies
Notes Granted 21 August 1982 Escutcheon Azure, a cross patonce within an orle of eight acorns cups inwards Or. Motto 'Tentaverunt me Patres Vestri'

== See also ==
- Heraldry societies
- The Heraldry Society
- The College of Arms
