= The Heraldry Society =

British learned society

Coat of arms of the Heraldry Society. The black unicorns are a reference to the arms of the founder, John Brooke-Little, who became Clarenceux King of Arms.

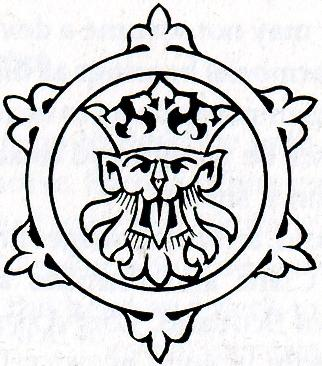
Badge of the Heraldry Society

The Heraldry Society is a British organization that is devoted to studying and promoting heraldry and related subjects. In 1947, a twenty-year-old John Brooke-Little founded the Society of Heraldic Antiquaries. This name was changed to the Heraldry Society in 1950. It was incorporated in 1956 and is now a registered educational charity, with the registered charity number 241456.

The principal object of the society is to extend interest in and knowledge of heraldry, genealogy, precedence, and related disciplines. The society also offers qualifications for heraldists: in conjunction with the Institute of Heraldic and Genealogical Studies three examination levels are offered – Elementary, Intermediate, and Advanced – which when taken successfully in sequence lead to an award of the Society's Diploma and the post-nominal DipHS.

For fifty years, John Brooke-Little served as the chairman of the Heraldry Society. In 1997, as he was ending his career as an officer of arms, he changed roles in the society to become its president. He served in this role until his death in February 2006. In addition to being chairman and president of the society, Brooke-Little served as the Honorary Editor of the society's scholarly journal, The Coat of Arms. From the first publication of the journal until the middle of 1965, his mother, Constance Egan, served as the managing editor of The Coat of Arms, though Brooke-Little always had a guiding influence on the publication. It was not until 2005 that Brooke-Little finally handed complete control of the journal to two young officers of arms, Peter O'Donoghue (then Bluemantle Pursuivant) and Clive Cheesman (then Rouge Dragon Pursuivant).

Although based in London, the society has an international membership. In December 2006, the Patron of the society, The 18th Duke of Norfolk, became President of the society, leaving the post of Patron vacant.

The Heraldry Society also publishes reference works about Heraldry and Coat of Arms, notably The Illustrated Book of Heraldry by member Stephen Slater.

== See also ==
- College of Arms
- Heraldry Society of Scotland
- The Heraldry Society of New Zealand
- Royal Heraldry Society of Canada
- American College of Heraldry and Arms
- Committee on Heraldry of the New England Historic Genealogical Society
- White Lion Society
- Flag Institute
- The Armorial Register
