= Fitzalan Pursuivant Extraordinary =

English royal officer of arms

- The heraldic badge of Fitzalan Pursuivant of Arms Extraordinary
- Heraldic tradition: Gallo-British
- Jurisdiction: England, Wales and Northern Ireland
- Governing body: College of Arms

Fitzalan Pursuivant of Arms Extraordinary is a current officer of arms in England. As a pursuivant extraordinary, Fitzalan is a royal officer of arms, but is not a member of the corporation of the College of Arms in London. As with many other extraordinary offices of arms, Fitzalan Pursuivant obtains its title from one of the baronies held by the Duke of Norfolk, Earl Marshal of England; the appointment was first made for the coronation of Queen Victoria in 1837. The badge of office was assigned in 1958 and is derived from a Fitzalan badge of the fifteenth century. It can be blazoned An Oak Sprig Vert Acorns Or, but is also recorded as A Sprig of Oak proper.

The first four Fitzalans, beginning with Sir Albert Woods, subsequently became Garter Principal King of Arms. Charles Wilfrid Scott-Giles, the well-known heraldic writer, also served as Fitzalan Pursuivant. The current Fitzalan Pursuivant of Arms Extraordinary is Alastair Andrew Bernard Reibey Bruce of Crionaich, second cousin to the Hon. Adam Bruce, Marchmont Herald of Arms.

== Holders of the office ==
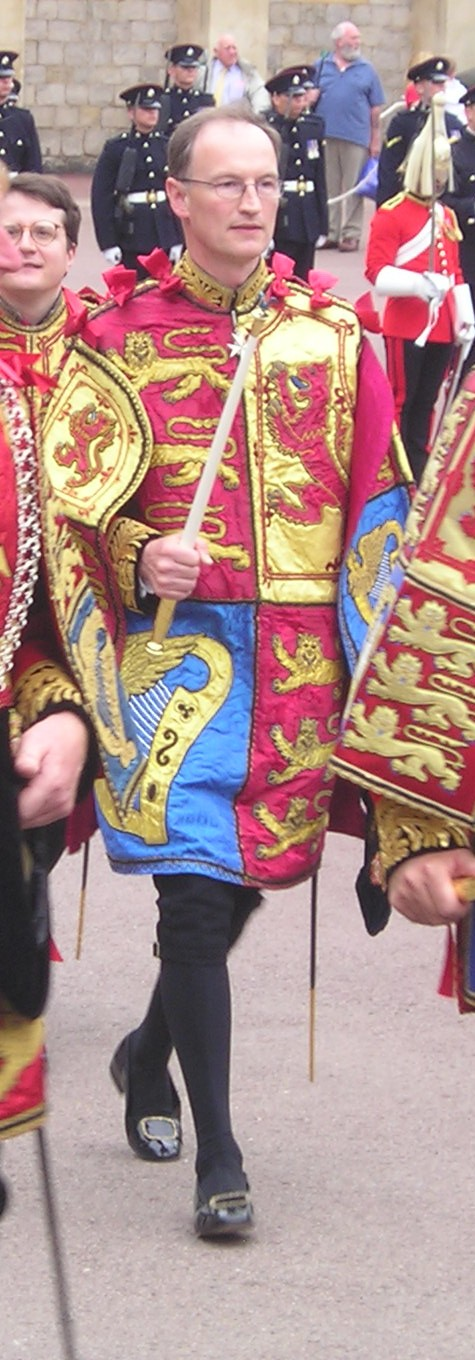
Alastair Bruce of Crionaich, 2006

Arms	Name	Date of appointment	Ref
	Albert William Woods	1837	
	Gerald Woods Wollaston	28 May 1902–1906	
	Algar Henry Stafford Howard	(23 May–October) 1911	
	Alexander Colin Cole	27 April 1953–1957	
	Wilfrid Scott-Giles	22 August 1957–1982	
	John Martin Robinson	1 October 1982–1989	
	Alastair Bruce of Crionaich	7 October 1998–Present	

== See also ==
- Heraldry
- Officer of Arms
