= Polish Heraldry Society =

- Polskie Towarzystwo Heraldyczne
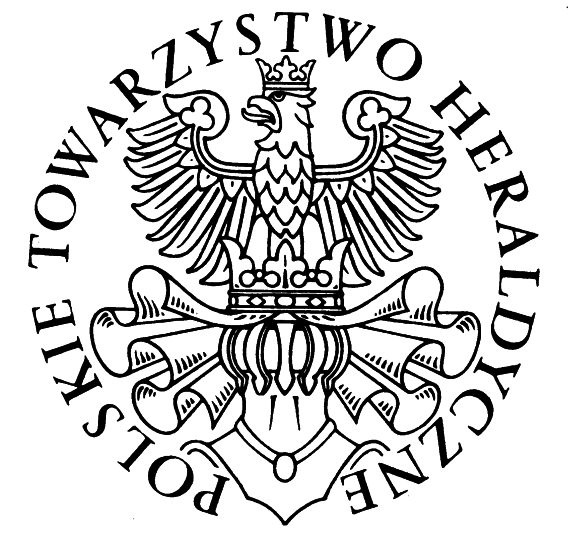
- Emblem of the Polish Heraldry Society
- Abbreviation: PTHer
- Formation: 1987
- Type: Learned society
- Registration no.: 0000276917
- Legal status: Active
- Headquarters: Warsaw, Poland
- Fields: Heraldry
- President: Sławomir Górzyński
- Website: pther.org

The Polish Heraldry Society (PTHer) (Polish: Polskie Towarzystwo Heraldyczne) is a Polish learned society specializing in Polish heraldry, founded in 1987 in Warsaw.

== History ==
Emblem of the Polish Heraldry Society from 1987 to 1991

The founding meeting was chaired by one of the last then-living authors publishing in the pre-war journal Miesięcznik Heraldyczny (Heraldry Monthly) by Prof. Dr. Aleksander Gieysztor, although he was not a member of the pre-war Society.

== Activity ==
In accordance with its statutory goals, the society aims to develop, deepen, and disseminate research in the field of heraldry as a historical science. Furthermore, the members' area of interest also covers other sciences related to heraldry such as genealogy. The organization cooperates with the Polish Academy of Sciences, universities, archives, and museums in Poland and abroad, as well as with other heraldic societies.

The society is a member of the International Confederation of Genealogy and Heraldry (French: Confédération Internationale d'Héraldique et de Généalogie). Outside of Warsaw, the society has regional branches in Kraków, Lublin, and Poznań. One of the statutory goals of the PTHer is to consult with local government authorities on heraldic matters, especially the creation of new coats of arms. Members of the Society sit on the Heraldic Commission at the Ministry of the Interior and Administration.

The PTHer also conducts publishing and exhibition activities (including "Ars Heraldica" – Warsaw 1991, "Orzeł Biały" – Kraków 1994). The cyclic publications of the PTHer include:

- Biuletyn Polskiego Towarzystwa Heraldycznego (Bulletin of the Polish Heraldry Society)
- Rocznik Polskiego Towarzystwa Heraldycznego (Yearbook of the Polish Heraldry Society)

Among the projects carried out by the Society, notable ones include the preparation of a digital version of the Crown Metrica, the preparation of a register of Płock officials, dozens of monographs and collective works, and the digitization of court records from the Old Polish period of Płock, Kowal, Przedecz, and southern Masovia among others.

The scientific activity of the Society also includes numerous academic meetings held in Warsaw as well as meetings at the branches in Kraków, Lublin, and Poznań.

The Society also carries out projects outside of Poland, including the conservation of tombstones in France (Mieczysław Kamieński at the Montmartre Cemetery, Michał Wiszniewski at the Cimiez Cemetery in Nice, Polish graves in Ouarville, Konstanty Czyszkowski at the Montée de Silhol Cemetery in Alès, Jan Nepomucen Mieszkowski in Poitiers; in 2024, two graves at the Trabuquet Cemetery in Menton will be restored).

In 2017, the PTHer organized the 1st Congress of Polish Heraldry. The 2nd Congress was held in 2023.

== Board of Directors ==
The President of the Society (since 2010):

- Prof. dr hab. Sławomir Górzyński – President

Main Board of the PTHer (elected in 2021):

- Dr hab. prof. UKSW Przemysław Mrozowski – Vice President
- Prof. dr hab. Jarosław Wenta – Vice President
- Prof. dr hab. Andrzej Sikorski – Secretary General
- Dr hab. Tomisław Giergiel – Deputy Secretary General
- Dr hab. prof. UKSW Artur Górak – Treasurer
- Dr hab. prof. UŁ Marek Adamczewski – Deputy Treasurer
- Prof. dr hab. Andrzej Wojciech Rachuba – Member of the Main Board
- Jerzy Adam Mrozowicki – Member of the Main Board
- Dr Tomasz Sławiński – Member of the Main Board
- Dr hab. prof. UJ Marcin Starzyński – Member of the Main Board
- Dr hab. prof. UJ Janusz Pezda – Member of the Main Board
- Dr hab. prof. UMK Wiesław Nowosad – Member of the Main Board

== Honorary members ==
- Adam Heymowski
- Conrad Marshall Swan
- Andrzej Ciechanowiecki
- Stefan Krzysztof Kuczyński
- Włodzimierz Dworzaczek

== See also ==
- Polish heraldry
- Heraldic Commission
