= The Heraldry Society of New Zealand =

- Formation: 1962
- Headquarters: Auckland, New Zealand
- President: Colin R. J. Davis, JP KCHS DipLGA DipTP DipUrbVal FHSNZ
- Patron: Dame Cindy Kiro, GNZM QSO DStJ
- Website: heraldry.nz

The Heraldry Society of New Zealand, established in 1962, is the principal New Zealand learned society concerned with the scholarly study of heraldry.

Operationally and constitutionally, it is completely independent of The Heraldry Society in England. It was known as The Heraldry Society (New Zealand Branch) until November 2007.

It publishes a quarterly journal, The New Zealand Armorist, and its present patron is Dame Cindy Kiro GNZM QSO DStJ, 22nd Governor-General of New Zealand. The current president of the Society is Colin Davis.

== Badge ==
In November 2008, the Heraldry Society of New Zealand adopted an heraldic badge, the blazon of which is:

On a roundel Vert, a lion sejant affronty Or, langued Gules, armed Argent, crowned with an ancient crown Or, supporting with its fore-paws an escutcheon quarterly Azure and Gules, on an inescutcheon between four stars (mullets) in cross Argent, a lymphad, sail furled, oars in action Sable, flagged Gules; in the dexter chief of the roundel, a scroll Or with the motto ONWARD Gules.

The green (Vert) background of the roundel is intended to symbolise the forests of New Zealand, and the shields (escutcheon and inescutcheon) are meant to represent heraldry.

The blue (Azure) and red (Gules) quarters of the shield, the black (Sable) lymphad on white (Argent), the stars of the Southern Cross, were all influenced by the coat of arms of New Zealand. The motto "Onward" comes from the 1911 version of the New Zealand arms.

The colours of the quarters of the shield were also influenced by the arms of their former parent society, as were the lion’s face and ancient crown.

The lion is gold (Or) like the English royal lions, and faces the viewer (sejant affronty) like that in the crest of the royal coat of arms in Scotland.

== See also ==
- New Zealand heraldry
- Heraldry societies
