= Step One (charity) =

British charity

- Staff helping to launch the charity's new name
- Type: Charity
- Website: www.steponecharity.co.uk
- Formerly called: St. Loyes College for the Training and Rehabilitation of the Disabled; St Loye's Foundation

Step One is an English charity that supports people to fulfil their potential through specialist mental health, employment and supported living services. It was formerly known as St Loye's Foundation.

== History ==
St Loye's Foundation and its subsidiary Community Care Trust merged in 2015 because of increasing recognition of the links between support for people with disabilities and mental health conditions.

Elizabeth II was patron of St Loye's Foundation and supported the charity from 1946.

The charity ran Cypress Independent Hospital until it closed in 2018.
