= The Armorial Register =

British publisher of heraldry

The Armorial Register Limited
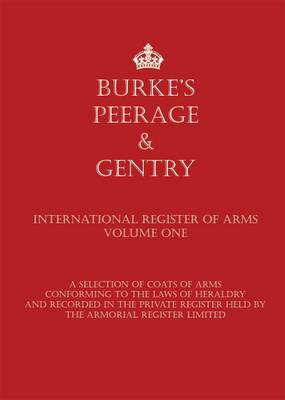
- Founded: 2006
- Country of origin: United Kingdom
- Headquarters location: Glasgow, Scotland
- Publication types: Books
- Nonfiction topics: Heraldry and genealogy
- Official website: armorialregister.com

The Armorial Register Limited is a British publishing company focused on heraldic and genealogical topics. It was founded in 2006 with the aim of producing works related to heraldry and associated fields of study.

== Publications ==
The Armorial Register Limited's main publication is the Armorial Register - International Register of Arms. This work was originally titled Burke's Peerage & Gentry International Register of Arms when the publishing rights were held under license by Burke's Peerage until 2011. At this point, the license was surrendered by the company and the publication was rebranded under its current name.

The publication functions as a roll of arms, allowing individuals from around the world to record legitimately granted, inherited or assumed coats of arms. However, as a private venture, it holds no official heraldic authority or powers of judgment over genealogical matters.

The contents of the publication are periodically compiled and edited into bound volume book formats. Thus far, four such volumes of the book have been released since the founding of the publisher in 2006.

== Arms ==
Coat of arms of the Armorial Register Limited
Escutcheon Azure, within an Orle of chains Or linking eight Escutcheons Argent an open Book Proper fore-edges and binding Or.

The Armorial Register Limited petitioned for and received a grant of armorial bearings from the Court of the Lord Lyon: Granted by the Court of the Lord Lyon Scotland: 69th Page 90th Volume of the Public Register of All Arms and bearings of Scotland, 23 December 2013.

== See also ==
- College of Arms
- Lyon Court
- Canadian Heraldic Authority
- Chief Herald of Ireland
- Council of Heraldry and Vexillology (Belgium)
- Committee on Heraldry of the New England Historic Genealogical Society
- Burke's Peerage & Baronetage
