= Nobility association =

A nobility association is a hereditary society which admits mostly or exclusively persons it considers to belong to its country's nobility, according to either current law if it recognises nobility, or according to historical law if it doesn't recognise it anymore. Nobility associations function as social clubs and organise events such as balls, galas, and youth meetings, provide aid to members in need, represent the interests of the nobility in public, organise charitable endeavours, perform genealogical research, regulate succession to noble titles if the state does not, and combat heraldic, chivalric and nobiliary fraud. Most legitimate European nobility associations belong to the Commission d'information et de liaison des associations nobles d'Europe (CILANE).

== Classification ==
Nobility associations use the current or former nobiliary law of the country they are based in to determine eligibility for membership while most other hereditary societies set their own rules for admission. For the purpose of establishing nobility in countries that no longer recognise it in law, historical law that was valid at the time the nobility was officially abolished is consulted.

Candidates for membership typically have to provide irrefutable genealogical proof of membership in the nobility or possession of a title to be admitted. Typically, but not always, only descent from a person who was ennobled or recognised as noble by a sovereign state in accordance with laws that were valid at that time is a qualification for admission. This definition is used by CILANE. In most countries, nobility is only inherited in the male-line.

=== By scope ===
Most nobility associations have a national or even regional nature, owing to differences between the nobiliary laws of various countries and the common identity of their nobilities. CILANE is a federation of European nobility associations; it allows its member associations to admit foreign nobles as long as they are eligible for membership in another member association. The Swiss nobility association includes some families of local feudal or patrician extraction but also Swiss families ennobled by foreign monarchs.

=== By form of establishment and structure ===
Some nobility associations, such as the Swedish and Finnish Knights' Houses and the Baltic Knighthoods, were originally established as official estate representations in accordance with public law and formerly had legislative functions, but most were founded as private clubs. Many have obtained non-profit status.

The German association of nobility associations is a federal structure like CILANE and consists of several regional nobility associations.

=== By membership rules and voting rights ===
The Swedish and Finnish Knights' Houses consider themselves to be associations of noble families and only allow full, voting membership for the head of the family. Some associations only admit titleholders and sometimes their heirs, such as the Permanent Deputation and Council of Grandees of Spain and Titles of the Kingdom, the Japanese Kasumi Kaikan and the British Hereditary Peerage Association, Standing Council of the Baronetage and Standing Council of Scottish Chiefs. Sometimes, both titled and untitled nobles can become members of the association but only titleholders are eligible for election to the organisation's board. Most nobility associations allow full voting membership for all nobles, regardless of rank.

Some nobility associations are of a confessional nature, for example the Association of Catholic Nobles in Bavaria.

The admission of legally non-noble persons to nobility associations is a controversial issue which can affect whether an organisation is considered a nobility association. This can include:

- Children of noble mothers, illegitimate children and female-line descendants of nobles, who typically do not inherit nobility themselves;
- Persons who purport to have been ennobled by a royal pretender or in accordance with laws that were no longer valid at that moment;
- Heraldists and genealogists who have provided services to the association.

Associations which grant such exceptions do so for a variety of motivations, such as a lack of new members stemming from declining birthrates and the lack of new ennoblements, equality concerns (Note: Apart from Spain, no extant monarchy has, so far, attempted to change its nobiliary law, and the provision that nobility is only inherited in the legitimate male line has been affirmed as constitutionally permissible in Belgium and in the Netherlands.) or seeing non-noble descendants of nobles as carriers of noble culture. Associations which accept ennoblements by non-ruling pretenders typically consider themselves legitimist, while those that do not tend to avoid the discussion of succession to their country's throne.

CILANE generally only allows its member associations to grant non-voting, associate membership for non-noble persons. Notable exceptions are the Italian nobility association, which grants full membership to descendants of persons ennobled by King Umberto II after his deposition (but not by one of the two current pretenders to the Italian throne), and the nobility associations of Germany, some of which can admit non-nobles by decision of a special commission, usually individuals who have taken the surname of their noble mother to prevent its extinction.

== Examples ==
=== CILANE ===
The Commission d'information et de liaison des associations nobles d'Europe (CILANE) was established in 1959 as an umbrella organisation for European nobility associations. It only admits one association per country, and has strict criteria for recognising an organisation as legitimate.

As of March 2025, it includes the following associations:

- Belgium: Association de la Noblesse du Royaume de Belgique (ANRB-VAKB)
- Croatia: Croatian Nobility Association
- Denmark: Danish Nobility Association (Danish: Dansk Adels Forening, DAF)
- Germany: Vereinigung der Deutschen Adelsverbände (VdDA), (Note: The Austrian and Czech nobilities are represented by the VdDA. There is currently no Austrian nobility association.) itself consisting of 22 regional and confessional associations.
  - The Baltic Knighthoods are represented by the VdDA, even though their members generally (also) belong to the Russian and often also to the Swedish nobility.
- Finland: Finnish House of Nobility (Riddarhuset - Ritarihuone)
- France: Association d'entraide de la Noblesse Française (ANF)
- Holy See: Réunion de la Noblesse Pontificale (RNP)
- Hungary: Magyar Történelmi Családok Egyesülete (MTCSE)
- Italy: Corpo della Nobiltà Italiana (CNI)
- Malta: Committee of Privileges of the Maltese Nobility
- Netherlands: Nederlands Adelvereniging (NAV)
- Portugal: Associação da Nobreza Histórica Portugal (ANHP)
- Russia: Союз Дворян - Union de la Noblesse Russe (UNR)
- Spain: Jóvenes de la Nobleza Española (JNE)
- Sweden: Swedish House of Nobility (Riddarhuset)
- Switzerland: Association de Familles Suisses (AFS)
- United Kingdom: Commission and Association for the Armigerous Families of Great Britain (AFGB) (Note: AFGB recognises all persons with a right to arms granted by the College of Arms or Lord Lyon as belonging to the British nobility. Therefore, Irish historically noble families are eligible to join AFGB, as long as their arms were registered with the British authorities prior to independence.)

=== Non-CILANE ===
Some nobility associations are not part of CILANE because they are outside its geographic scope (Europe), because they disagree with or violate CILANE's criteria for recognition, because they do not seek to represent the entire nobility but only a subset, or because there is already an association representing the nobility of their country. These include:

- Britain:
  - Hereditary Peerage Association
  - Standing Council of the Baronetage
  - Standing Council of Scottish Chiefs
- Ireland: Standing Council of Irish Chiefs and Chieftains
- Italy:
  - Venetian Nobility Association (covers territories of the Republic of Venice)
- Japan: Kasumi Kaikan
- Poland: Polish Nobility Association
- Russia:
  - Russian Nobility Association in America
  - Russian Nobility Assembly
- Spain:
  - Permanent Deputation and Council of Grandees of Spain and Titles of the Kingdom, founded in 1815
  - Royal Association of Hidalgos of Spain (formerly part of CILANE, suspended)

== Similar concepts ==
=== Associations of descendants of nobles ===
Some associations which admit female-line descendants of nobles consider themselves associations of descendants of nobles rather than nobility associations in the narrow sense, either because they do not assume that nobility still exists legally or to avoid conflicts with nobiliary law. An Union of Descendants of Nobles of the Russian Empire was founded in Moscow in 2025.

=== Orders of chivalry requiring nobility ===
Some orders of chivalry require nobility for admission or for promotion to high grades. Depending on the strictness of the rules and the number of non-noble individuals admitted exceptionally, they can be considered nobility associations and often have the same social functions, but typically do not define themselves as such. Examples of such orders are the Order of Saint John in the Netherlands and the Order of Saint John in Sweden. The Order of Malta and the Most Venerable Order of Saint John in the United Kingdom require nobility for some grades, also admitting non-noble members. The Spanish military orders also have a nobiliary character.

Certain orders, instead of requiring nobility for admission, ennoble recipients at least on a personal basis. This is the case for British orders (depending on grade) and for those of the Russian Empire.

=== Para-nobiliary organisations ===
Some hereditary societies share common characteristics with nobility associations because the reference group from which their members descend was not noble but socially privileged, and because they also only recognise or prefer descent in the male line. This includes the Dutch and Catholic Burgher Unions of Sri Lanka, as well as the Society of the Cincinnati in the United States, which admits descendants of American Revolutionary War officers and was criticised by some Founding Fathers for its quasi-noble character.

There are also social clubs which do not have a hereditary character and do not require nobility for membership, but consist of nobles to a significant part, with non-noble members typically belonging to the upper bourgeoisie or to families closely related to the nobility. A notable example is the Jockey-Club de Paris.
