= CILANE =

Nobility association

The European Commission of the Nobility (French: Commission d'information et de liaison des associations nobles d'Europe, CILANE) is an organisation for cooperation of European nobility associations, established in 1959. Its seat is in Paris, France.

== Functioning ==
The CILANE has no president but rather a "Coordinator", elected for three years. The coordinator's role is to prepare and conduct the spring and autumn sessions of the CILANE and to carry out its decisions, enabling each national association to carry out projects together. It holds an international congress every three years.

National associations recognised by CILANE are hereditary societies which must only grant full membership to persons who are legally noble under the current or former laws of their countries. There is no personal membership; instead, members of associations recognised by CILANE participate in its activities through their associations.

The spring session takes place traditionally in Paris, the seat of the CILANE. In autumn the sessions are held in one of the other member countries. Significantly, most of the organisations represented in CILANE are private initiatives, particularly in nations where titles of nobility are no longer recognised by their respective states and therefore unregulated by law.

Due to the position of the Permanent Deputation and Council of Grandees of Spain and Titles of the Kingdom of only recognizing foreign titles as such if "...the succession in these titles should only be reflected when they have been possessed by people who have recognized the succession of kings effectively reigning, but not claimants or holders in exile of disappeared kingdoms", particularly "...in the case of titles of the extinct Kingdom of the Two Sicilies, such a kingdom no longer exists and the claimants to it are not effectively reigning monarchs", and the consequent internal divisions within it, Spain does not have official representation in the coordinating organization of the European nobility CILANE.

== Member associations ==
As of March 2025, CILANE includes the following associations:

- Belgium: Association de la Noblesse du Royaume de Belgique (ANRB-VAKB)
- Croatia: Croatian Nobility Association
- Denmark: Danish Nobility Association (Danish: Dansk Adels Forening, DAF)
- Germany: Vereinigung der Deutschen Adelsverbände (VdDA), (Note: The Austrian and Czech nobilities is represented by the VdDA. There is currently no Austrian nobility association.) itself consisting of 22 regional and confessional associations.
  - The Baltic Knighthoods are represented by the VdDA, even though their members generally (also) belong to the Russian and often also to the Swedish nobility.
- Finland: Finnish House of Nobility (Riddarhuset – Ritarihuone)
- France: Association d'entraide de la Noblesse Française (ANF)
- Holy See: Réunion de la Noblesse Pontificale (RNP)
- Hungary: Magyar Történelmi Családok Egyesülete (MTCSE)
- United Kingdom: Commission and Association for the Armigerous Families of Great Britain (AFGB) (Note: AFGB recognises all persons with a right to arms granted by the College of Arms or Lord Lyon as belonging to the British nobility. Therefore, Irish historically noble families are eligible to join AFGB, as long as their arms were registered with the British authorities prior to independence.)
- Italy: Corpo della Nobiltà Italiana (CNI)
- Malta: Committee of Privileges of the Maltese Nobility
- Netherlands: Nederlands Adelvereniging (NAV)
- Portugal: Associação da Nobreza Histórica Portugal (ANHP)
- Russia: Союз Дворян – Union de la Noblesse Russe (UNR)
- Spain: Jóvenes de la Nobleza Española (JNE)
- Sweden: Swedish House of Nobility (Riddarhuset)
- Switzerland: Association de Familles Suisses (AFS)

=== Great Britain ===
The Commission and Association for the Armigerous Families of Great Britain (AFGB) is the sole British nobility association recognised by CILANE. It was founded in 1996. AFGB was founded in 1996 under the auspices of the 17th Duke of Norfolk. Throughout its existence, it has cooperated with the English and Scottish heraldic authorities, and some of their representatives, such as Sir Henry Paston-Bedingfield, have joined the organisation.

AFGB admits members of the peerage and the gentry, using the right to heraldic arms as the main criterion for determining membership in the British nobility. All persons who have been granted arms by the College of Arms or Lord Lyon, as well as their male-line descendants entitled to the arms (or, in Scotland, entitled to matriculate a differenced version thereof) according to the Law of Arms may be admitted to the organisation. The AFGB utilises the same test of nobility as the Order of Malta, which equates the right to arms and the status of gentleman confirmed by it with untitled nobility in its British association. Feudal barons, esquires or gentlemen by prescription or office who are not also armigerous cannot be admitted to AFGB, but knights, baronets and peers can theoretically, even though a knighthood or hereditary title normally qualifies one for a grant of arms. AFGB only recognises a grant of arms as a nobiliary act if the recipient is a British citizen or is naturalised later.

Apart from being an association which admits persons who belong to the British nobility, AFGB also operates a commission, which seeks to coordinate the activities of more narrow organisations such as the Hereditary Peerage Association and facilitate their communication with CILANE and foreign nobility associations. The Duke of Norfolk presides over it. Current officers are:

- Coordinator of AFGB: Sir Henry Paston-Bedingfield, Bt, former Norroy and Ulster King of Arms
- Delegate to CILANE: Michael Sayer, Esq.
- Vice-Delegates to CILANE: Lord Abinger and Sir Richard Rowley, Bt
- Youth Organiser for CILANE: Viscount Jocelyn

== See also ==
- International Commission on Orders of Chivalry
