= Bucket shop =

A bucket shop was an unlicensed tavern in 19th-century London that sold discarded alcohol.

It also refers to:

- a business engaged in heraldic fraud, the sale of illegitimate heraldic credentials
- bucket shop (stock market), a gambling parlor that allows speculation on prices of stocks or commodities.
- an airline consolidator that specializes in multi-stop trips
