= BYA =

BYA may refer to:

- Black-Yellow Alliance, a monarchist movement in Austria
- Brigham Young Academy, an American school
- bya, a unit of time
- BYA (airline), an American charter airline
- BYA (railway station), a railway station serving the remote settlement of Berney Arms in the English county of Norfolk
