= Henry Paston-Bedingfeld =

British baronet and retired officer of arms

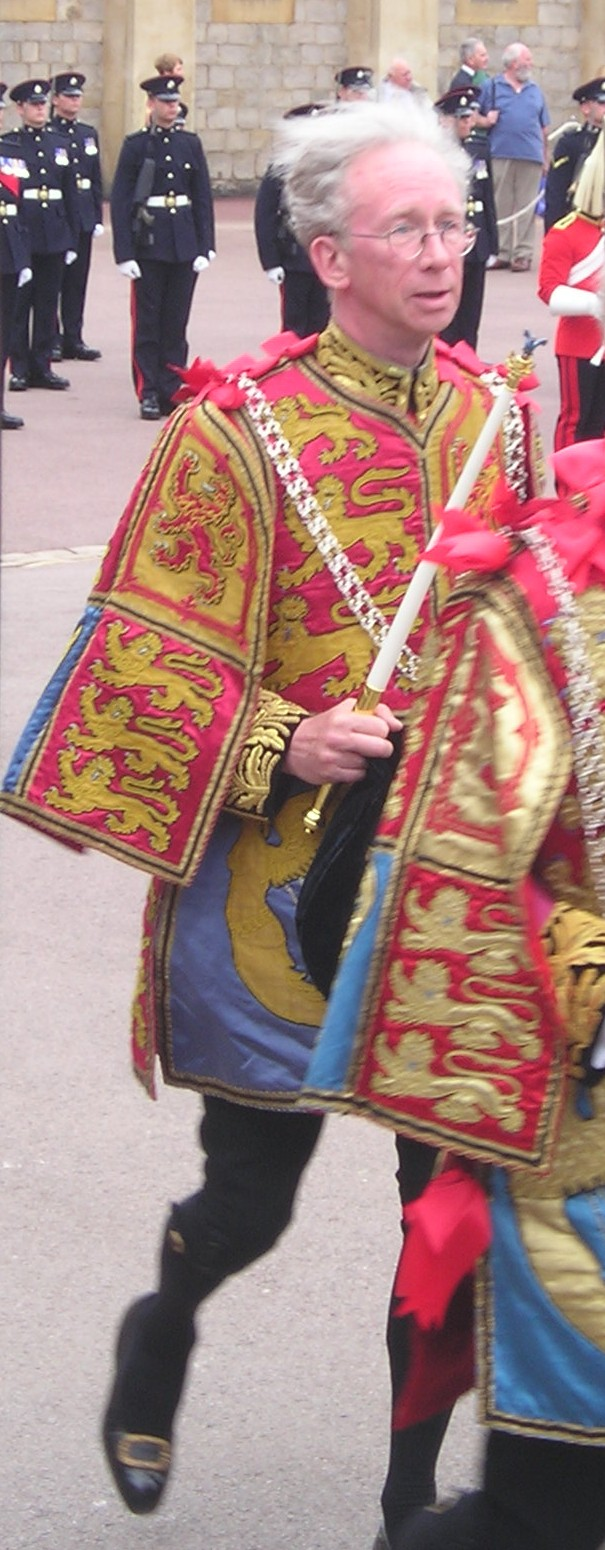
Sir Henry Paston-Bedingfeld wearing his ceremonial tabard during an annual Garter Service at St George's Windsor

Sir Henry Edgar Paston-Bedingfeld, 10th Baronet (born 7 December 1943) is a British baronet and retired officer of arms.

== Family and career ==
Paston-Bedingfeld is the only son of Sir Edmund Paston-Bedingfeld, 9th Baronet of Oxburgh Hall, Norfolk, by his wife Joan Lynette Rees. He succeeded to the family title upon his father's death on 24 May 2011. He was educated at Ampleforth College, then an all-boys Catholic private school in Ampleforth, Yorkshire.

Paston-Bedingfeld served as Rouge Croix Pursuivant from 1983, and then in 1993 became York Herald. In 2010 he was promoted to Norroy and Ulster King of Arms, the junior of the two provincial Kings-at-Arms, with jurisdiction over the north of England and Northern Ireland. In July 2014, he retired and was succeeded by Timothy Duke.

He is an Honorary Vice-president of the Cambridge University Heraldic and Genealogical Society and of the Norfolk Record Society; Sir Henry is also a liveryman of the Bowyers' Company and served as Master of the Scriveners' Company for 2012–13.

In 1968, Paston-Bedingfield married Mary Kathleen, a daughter of Brigadier Robert Ambrose CIE OBE MC, and they have two sons and two daughters; their elder son, Richard (born 1975) is heir apparent to the baronetcy.

Sir Henry Paston-Bedingfield is the current Coordinator of the Commission and Association for the Armigerous Families of Great Britain.

== Selected heraldic designs by Paston-Bedingfeld ==
- Derby Grammar School
- Institute of Traffic Accident Inspectors
- Royal Society of St George

== Honours ==
- – Baronet
- – Knight of Malta

=== Arms ===
Coat of arms of Henry Paston-Bedingfeld
Crest: 1. An Eagle displayed Or (Bedingfeld), 2. A Griffin sejant wings elevated Or gorged with a Collar Gules therefrom a Line held in the beak and terminating in a Ring of the Last (Paston); Helm That of a Knight Escutcheon Quarterly, 1st & 4th Ermine an Eagle displayed Gules (Bedingfeld), 2nd & 3rd Argent six Fleurs-de-lys three two and one Azure a Chief indented Or (Paston) Motto: 1. Despicio terrena, Solem contemplor ("I despise earthly things, I gaze upon the Sun"), 2. De mieulx je pense en mieulx ("I think of better and better things"); Orders A baronet's badge suspended beneath the arms Symbolism A Baronet's badge: Previous versions Sir Henry impaled his company's arms with those of his family during his year of office as Master Scrivener

== See also ==
- Heraldry
- College of Arms
- Oxburgh Hall
- Paston-Bedingfeld baronets

Baronetage of England
Preceded by Sir Edmund Paston-Bedingfeld	Baronet (of Oxburgh); 2011–present	Incumbent
Heraldic offices
Preceded by Sir Thomas Woodcock	Rouge Croix Pursuivant; 1983–1993	Succeeded by David White
Preceded by Peter Spurrier	York Herald; 1993–2010	Succeeded by Peter O'Donoghue
Preceded by Patric Dickinson	Norroy and Ulster King of Arms; 2010–2014	Succeeded by Timothy Duke
Civic offices
Preceded by Peter Esslemont	Master of the Worshipful Company of Scriveners; 2012–2013	Succeeded by John Tunesi of Liongam
