= Edmund Paston-Bedingfeld =

British Army officer

Sir Edmund Paston-Bedingfeld, Bt
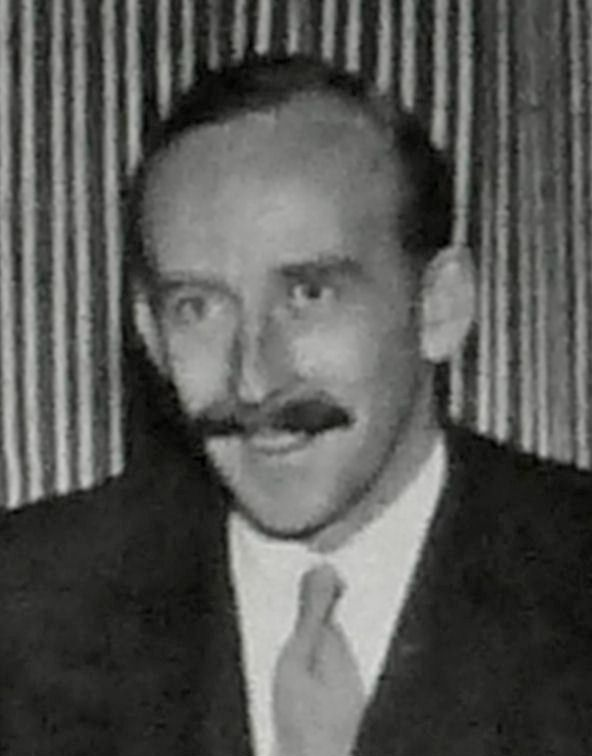
- Photograph of Paston-Bedingfeld, in 1948
- Born: Edmund George Felix Paston-Bedingfeld; 2 June 1915
- Died: 24 May 2011 (aged 95)
- Education: The Oratory School
- Alma mater: New College, Oxford
- Spouse(s): Joan Lynette Rees (m. 1942; div. 1952) Agnes Gluck (m. 1957; died 1974) Peggy Hannaford-Hill (m. 1975; died 1991) Sheila Douglas (m. 1992; died 2011)
- Children: Henry Paston-Bedingfeld; Alexandra Pemberton
- Parent(s): Sir Henry Paston-Bedingfeld, 8th Baronet; Sybil Lyne-Stephens
- Relatives: Sir Henry Paston-Bedingfeld, 7th Baronet (grandfather)

Sir Edmund George Felix Paston-Bedingfeld, 9th Baronet (2 June 1915 – 24 May 2011) was a landowner and British Army officer.

== Early life ==
Paston-Bedingfield was born on 2 June 1915. He was the third, but eldest surviving, son of Maj. Sir Henry Paston-Bedingfeld, 8th Baronet and Sybil Lyne-Stephens.

His paternal grandparents were Sir Henry Paston-Bedingfeld, 7th Baronet and the former Augusta Lucy Clavering, only child and heiress of Edward John Clavering, of Callaly Castle. His mother was the eldest daughter of Henry Alexander Claremont Lyne-Stephens of Grove House, Roehampton (son of Edward Stopford Claremont), and Katherine Gregory Walker (who married his grandfather's younger brother, Raoul, after his grandfather's death).

He was educated at The Oratory School and at New College, Oxford.

== Career ==
He was a member of the 5th battalion, Royal Norfolk Regiment in the 1930s, before becoming a Major in the Welsh Guards Regiment, during World War II. He served in north-west Europe in 1940, and from 1944 to 1945, and was mentioned in despatches. He was a member of the London Guards' Club. A major Norfolk landowner and Lord of the manor of Oxborough, he succeeded to the baronetcy in 1941 upon the death of his father.

== Personal life ==
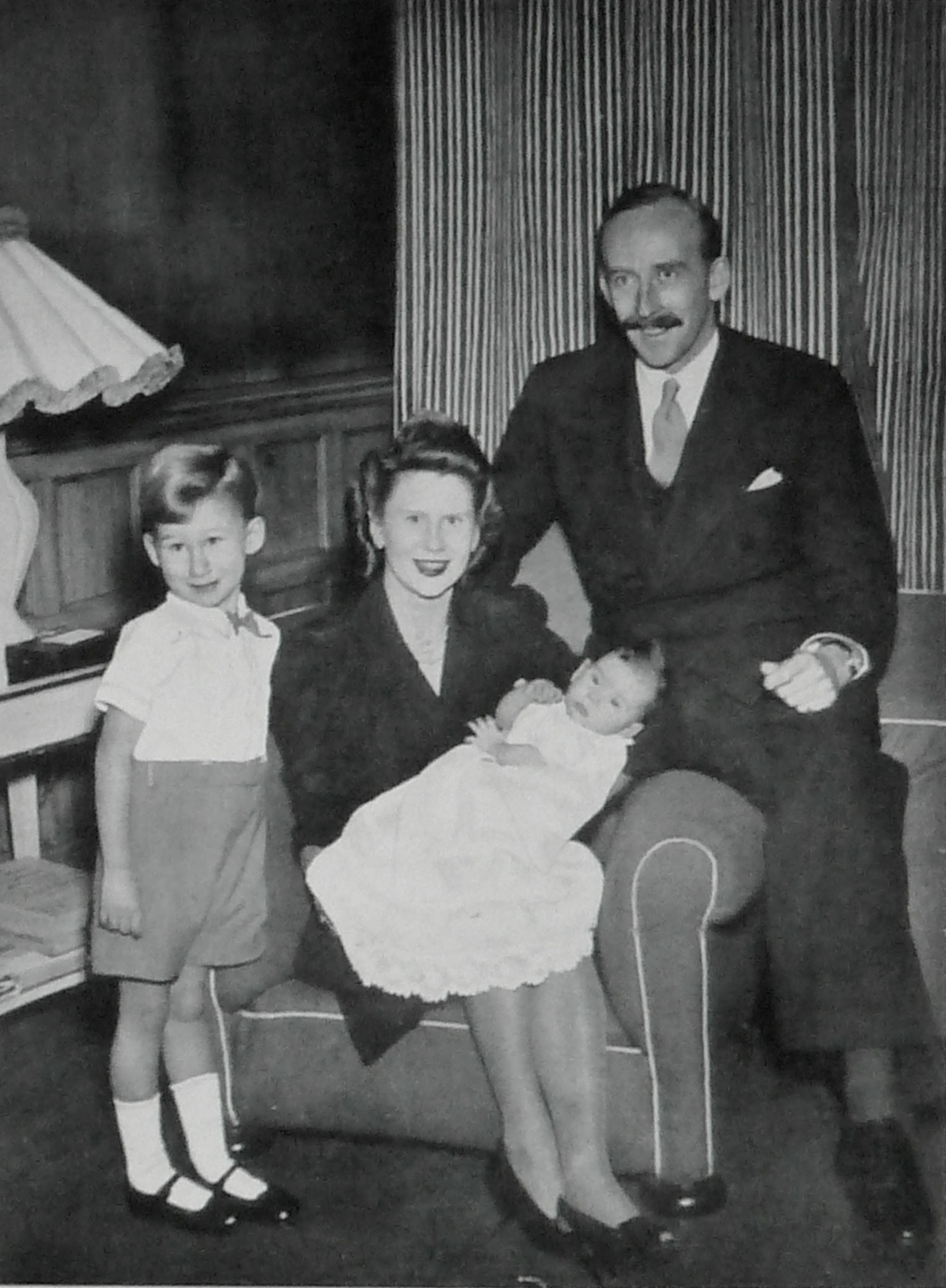
Photograph of Sir Edmund with his first wife and two children, 1948

On 6 June 1942, Paston-Bedingfeld married Joan Lynette Rees (d. 1965), a daughter of Edgar Rees, of Lwyneithin, Llanelly, Wales. Before their divorce in 1952, on the grounds of his adultery, they had a son and a daughter:

- Sir Henry Edgar Paston-Bedingfeld, 10th Baronet (b. 1943), who married Mary Kathleen Ambrose, a daughter of Brig. Robert Ambrose, in 1968.
- Alexandra Winifred Mary Paston-Bedingfeld (b. 1947), who married James Michael Yearsley, son of J. Yearsley, in 1970. They divorced in 1977 and she married Jack Pemberton in 1978.

After their divorce, Joan married Richard Dewar Neame and then Hon. John David Coulson Fellowes (a grandson of the 2nd Baron de Ramsey). Five years later, he married Agnes Kathleen Susan Anne Gluck (d. 1974), daughter of Miklos Gluck (of Budapest), on 31 May 1957. She died in 1974.

His third marriage was on 20 November 1975, to Peggy Hannaford-Hill. She died in 1991.

His fourth, and last, marriage was to Sheila Douglas, daughter of John Douglas, on 15 February 1992.

Sir Edmund he died on 24 May 2011 at age 95 at Bury St. Edmunds, Suffolk, and was succeeded by his son Henry, who has retired as Norroy and Ulster King of Arms.

Baronetage of England
Preceded by Henry Paston-Bedingfield	Baronet (of Oxburgh); 1941–2011	Succeeded by Henry Paston-Bedingfeld
