= Order of Saint John of Jerusalem (Russia) =

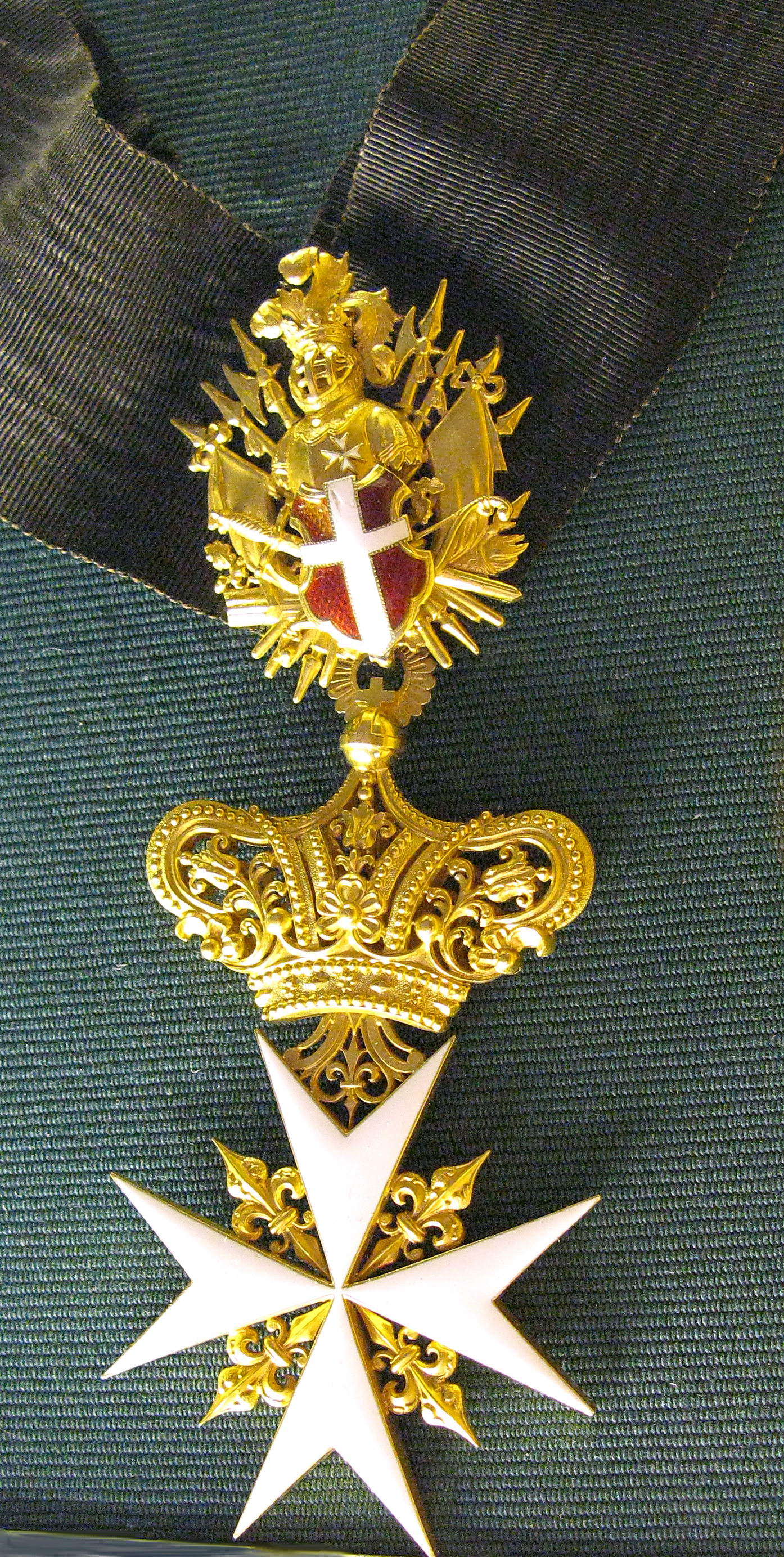
- Commander's Cross of the Order of Saint John of Jerusalem
- Established: December 10, 1798
- Ribbon: Black
- Status: Not awarded
- Founder: Pavel I
- Classes: 3
- Ribbon of the Order

The Order of Saint John of Jerusalem (Maltese Cross) was an order of the Russian Empire that was named after Saint John the Baptist.

== History ==
In 1798, when Napoleon I captured Malta during an expedition to Egypt, the knights of the order turned to the Russian Emperor Paul I with a request to assume the rank of Grand Master of the Order of Saint John of Jerusalem, to which the latter agreed. On November 29, 1798, Paul I issued the highest Manifesto on the Establishment in Favor of the Russian Nobility of the Order of Saint John of Jerusalem and the Rule for the Acceptance of the Nobility of the Russian Empire into this order.

During the reign of Paul I, the Order of Saint John of Jerusalem became, in essence, the highest distinction awarded for civil and military merit. The award of the commandery surpassed in its significance even the awarding of the Order of Saint Andrew the First–Called, since this expressed the personal benevolence of the sovereign. On the day of his coronation on April 5, 1797, Paul I united the order corporations existing in Russia into a single Russian Cavalier Order, or Cavalier Society. However, it did not include holders of the orders established by Empress Catherine II – Saint George and Saint Vladimir.

The successor of Paul I on the Russian throne, Alexander I, removed the Maltese cross from the State Emblem and resigned as Grand Master. The awarding of the Order was discontinued, while the Order as an organization continued to exist. On February 26, 1810, Alexander I issued a decree prescribing, "leaving the existence of this Order to the discretion in its present position", to transfer the financial activities of the Order to the State Treasury.

On January 20, 1817, the highest decree "On the Prohibition of Those Receiving the Order of Saint John of Jerusalem at the Present Time to Wear It" followed. The decree was issued due to the fact that, through the mediation of the holder of the Grand Commander's Cross of the Order of Saint John of Jerusalem, the envoy of Serra de Capriola, several Russian citizens received this order shortly before the decree was issued. In the decree, the ban was motivated by the fact that the Russian Priory Order no longer exists. (Note: De jure, this meant that from the date of issuance of the decree, the order should have been considered foreign.) The decree did not contain a ban on wearing the order received during the existence of his Russian Priory.

Badges of the Order of Saint John of Jerusalem

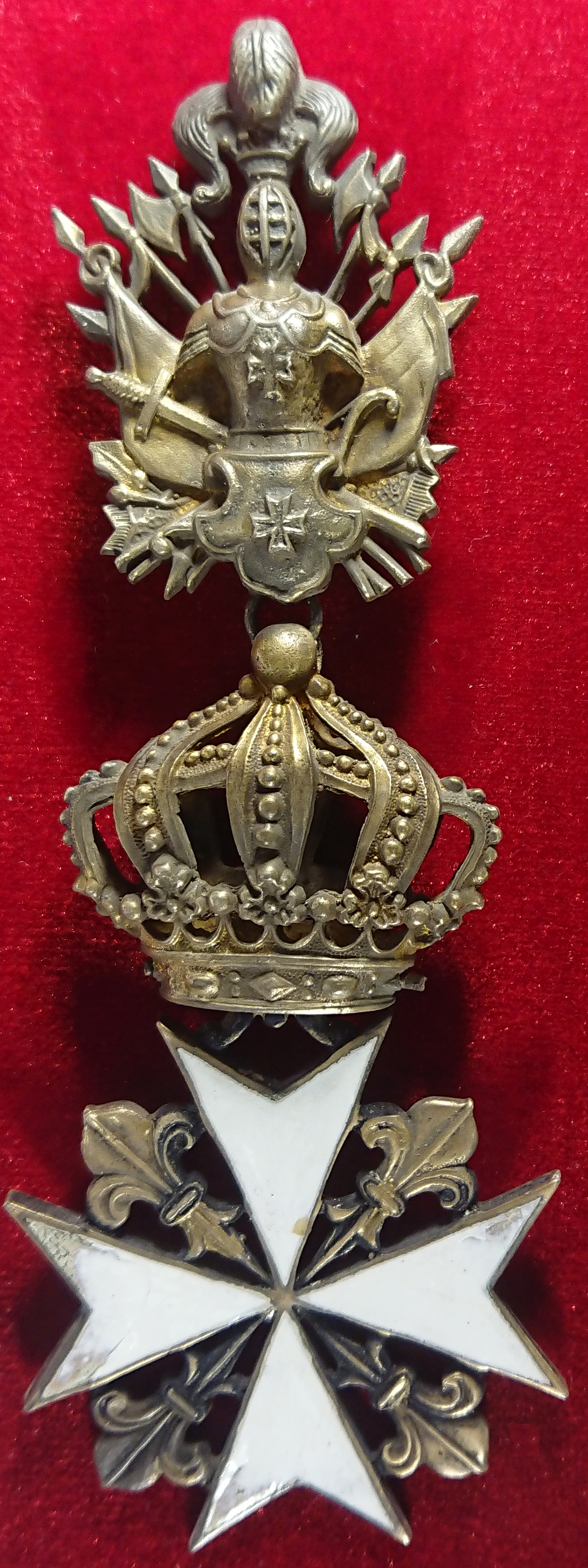

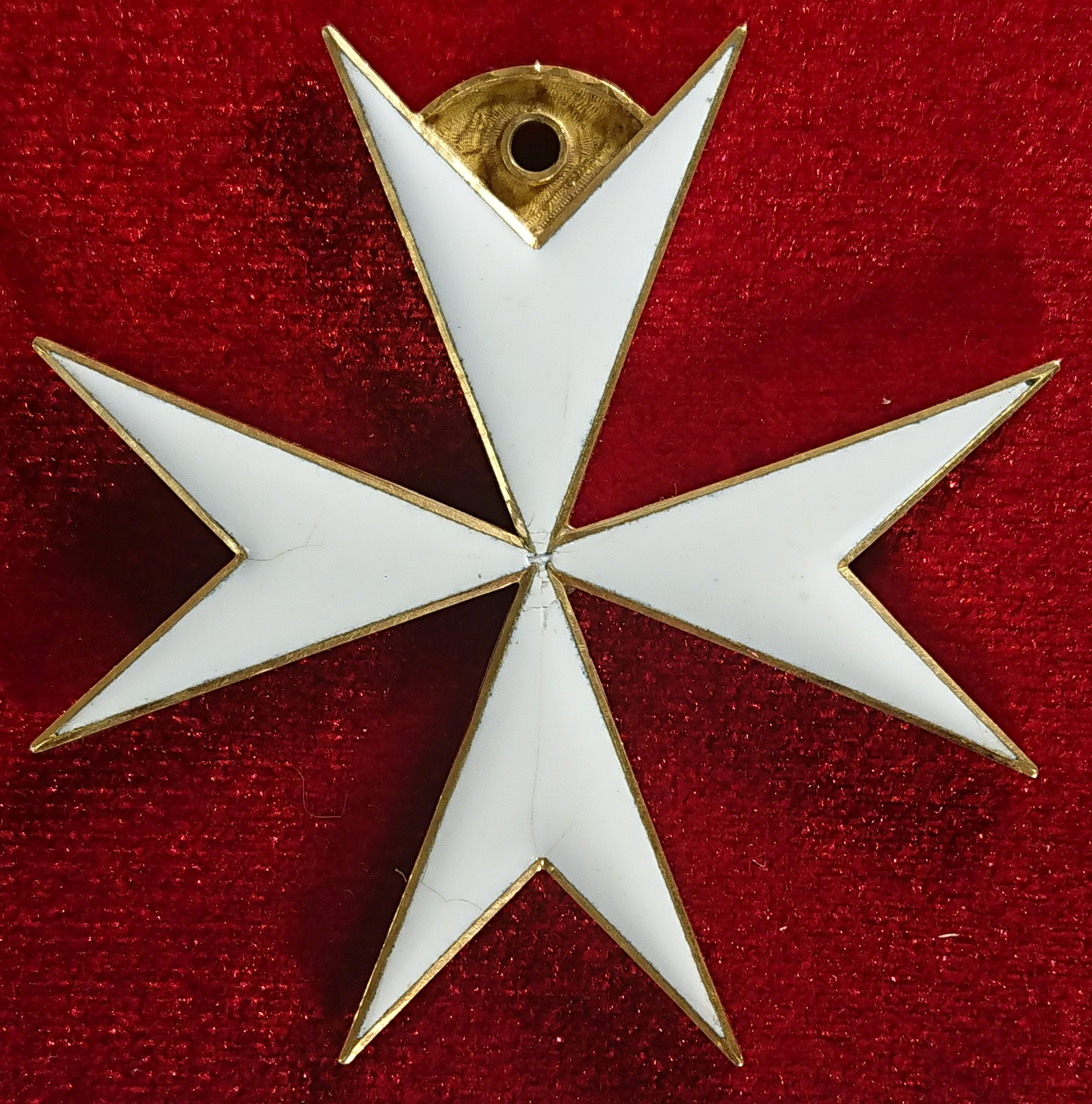

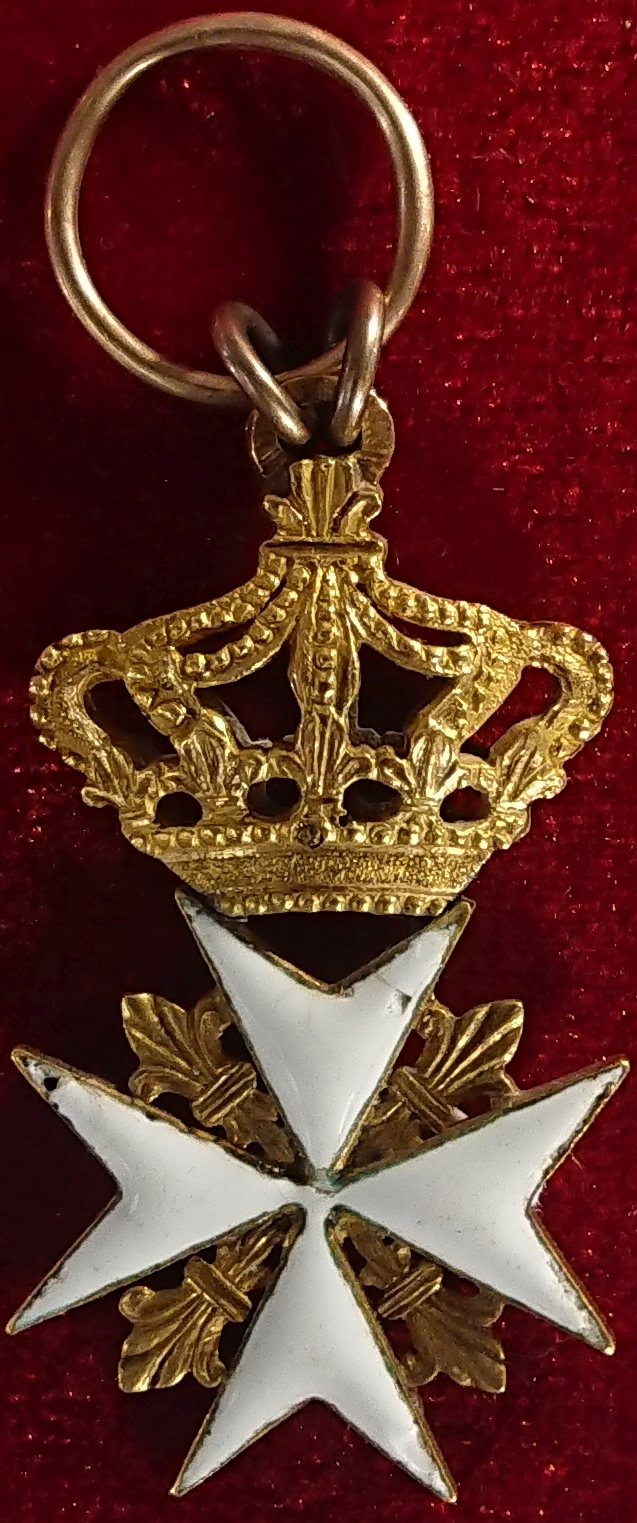

== Degrees ==
The order had three degrees:

- I degree – Grand Commander's Cross;
- II degree – Commander;
- III degree – Cavalier.

== Gallery ==
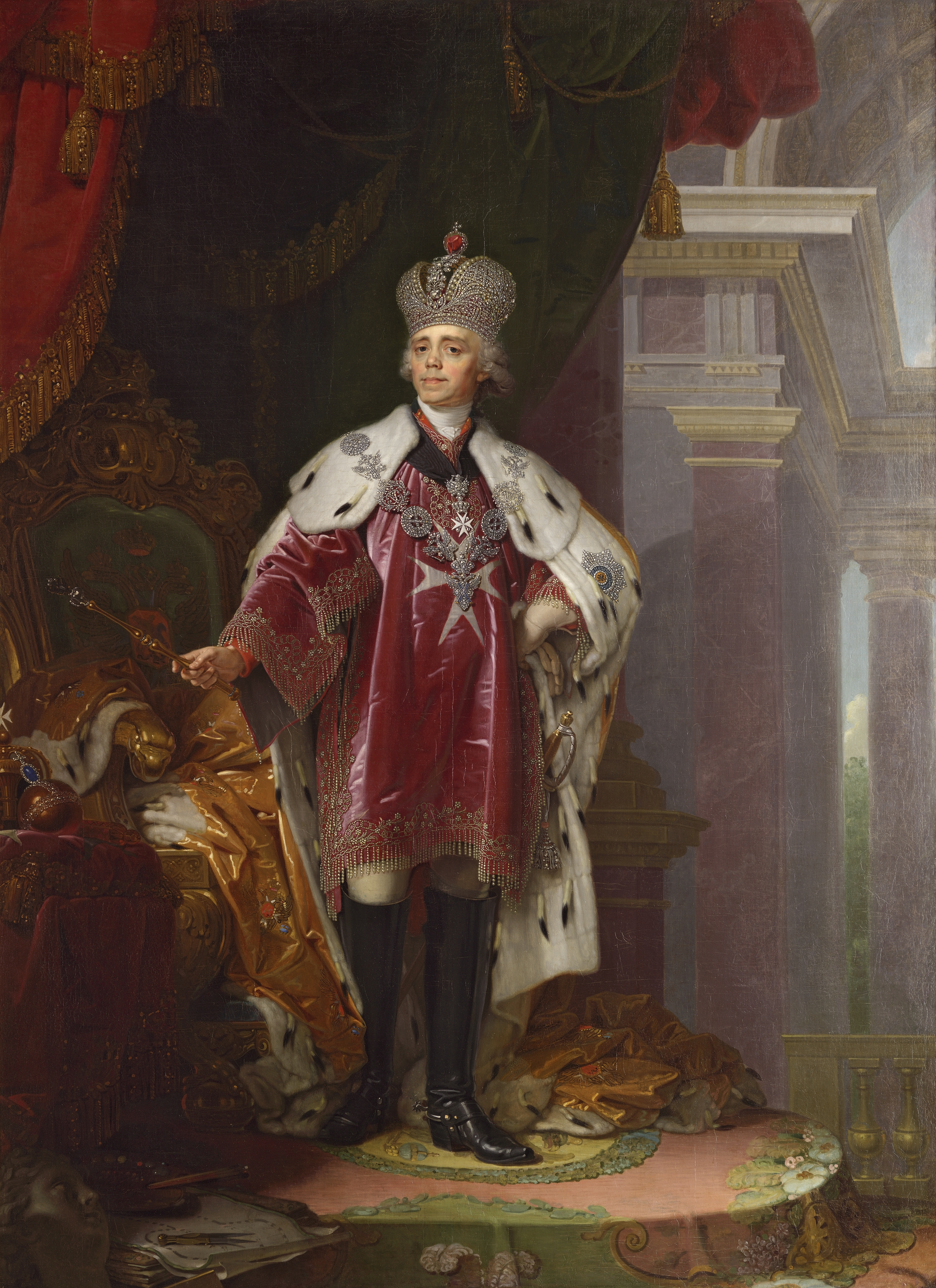
Portrait of Paul I dressed as Grand Master of the Order of Malta by Vladimir Borovikovsky, 1800

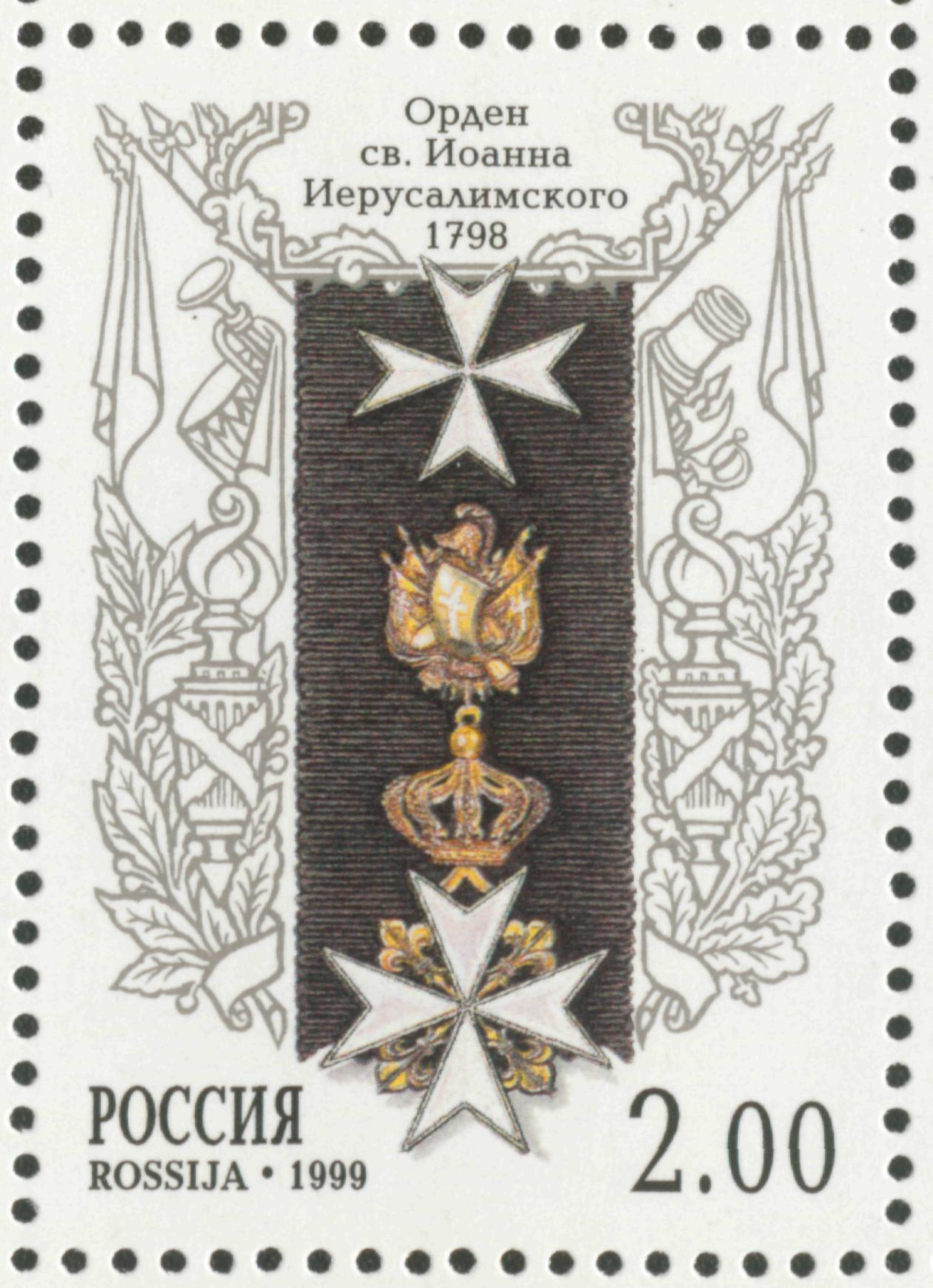
Postage stamp of Russia, 1999

== See also ==
- Orders of the Russian Empire
- Sovereign Military Order of Malta
- Russian tradition of the Knights Hospitaller

== Sources ==
- Yuri Miloslavsky. Hospitables: Orthodox Branch of the Sovereign Order of the Knights Hospitaller of Saint John of Jerusalem – Saint Petersburg: Tsarskoye Delo, 2001 – 240 Pages
- Ivan Spassky (1993). Foreign and Russian Orders Until 1917. Saint Petersburg: Dorval. ISBN 5-8308-0042-X.
- Leonid Shepelev (1999). Official World of Russia: 18th – Early 20th Centuries. Saint Petersburg: Art, Saint Petersburg. ISBN 5-210-01518-1.
