= Hereditary Commander =

Hereditary military position

A Hereditary Commander is a (Knight) Commander whose family holds that title by hereditary right.

== Hereditary Commanders of the Russian tradition ==
Russian tradition of the Knights Hospitaller was officially launched by Paul I of Russia in January 1797. The original 1797 statute allotted ten revenue-producing estates, the commanderies, to be issued to the most deserving knights of the Order. The award was not hereditary; the recipients (commanders) were obligated to contribute a share of commandery revenue to the Order. In November–December 1798 Paul assumed the title of Grand Master of the Order and expanded its operation in Russia, increasing the number of non-hereditary commanderies to 99. In 1799 Paul decreed the statute for hereditary commanderies (Russian: родовые командорства, also translated as ancestral or familial commanderies). Unlike ordinary commanderies that provided direct financial benefits to their commanders, hereditary commanderies were financed by the applicants themselves. An eligible applicant needed to pledge his own real estate to the order, provided that it was sufficiently large to generate 3,000 roubles annual income. Hereditary commanderies remitted 10% of their revenue to the Order.

Two examples within the Order of St John of Jerusalem of Ancestral Commanderies before the creation of the Russian Grand Priory are the Priory of Bohemia and the Priory of Poland prior to its absorption into the Russian Priory. One early precedent is that of Grand Master Jean de Lascaris-Castellar (1636–1657) granting an hereditary knighthood to the Vicomte d'Arpajon for assisting in checking a Turkish attack on Malta.

Ancestral Commanderies during the reigns of Paul I and Alexander I of Russia were:

1. Narychkine, 2. Count Chéréméteff, 3. Prince Youssoupoff †, 4. Stroganov †, 5. Count Samoiloif ‡, 6. Prince Belosselsky, 7. Prince Dolgoroukov, 8. Davydov, 9. Prince Barytinsky, 10. Démidoff, 11. Prince Troubetzkoy, 12. Count Worontzoff, 13. Maruzzi †, 14. Beklechev †, 15. Prince Tioufiakine †, 16. Count Olsoufieff, 17. Gerebtzoff, 18. Count Strogonoff †, 19. Boutourline, 20. Potemkine †, 21. Tchirikoff †, 22. Prince Khilkoff ‡, 23. Prince Odoevsky †, 24 Prince Youssoupoff †.

Key. † Direct Male line from the first Commander extinct. ‡ Direct Male line is extinct, but the family was reinstated via the female line by the Imperium.

There were originally 24 Commanders of Families registered in 23 families (with two Commanderies in one family). Under the Imperial Ukase 19.044 of 1799 (July 21 Old Style) it is clear that there can be only one Commander per Commandery. Thus only 24 Hereditary Commanders could ever have existed. In Article XI, it is also true that more than one Commandery per family could be founded, and this happened (Youssoupoff). However all such Commanderies were created under the regulations given in the Ukase "Ancestral Commanderies of Jus Patronatus" of 1799. Furthermore, pluralities were listed separately.

=== Changes to the Russian Ancestral Commanderies in 1810 and 1811 ===
The Beneficed Commanderies were weaned of state funds in 1810 (Ukase 24.134. of 1810), their holders being given other posts with comparable compensation, and the affected properties of the Family Commanders were handed back to the families, provided a redemption payment was made (Ukase 24.882. of 1811). The Order's properties were also reclaimed by the state; for example, the Palace of the Sovereign Order of St John of Jerusalem in St. Petersburg was given to the Corps des Pages to serve as a military academy.

=== Qualifications needed by candidates ===
Russian Hereditary Commanders, must be confirmed as such under the Russian Laws which gave birth to that category of membership; Ukase 19.044 of 1799 specifies inter alia "5 years of seniority in the Order and 2 years of seniority of military service" in the Order's troops, in other words five years belonging to the Order, and two years military service in the Order. None of the descendants of the Family Commanders in the days of the Empire and into exile qualified in these respects.

Even where the candidate is qualified, he must demonstrate that he is the "present representative elder of the masculine posterity of its first beneficiary"; Professor Baron Michel Alexsandrovitch, de Taube. L'Empereur Paul I de Russie, Grand Maître de l'Ordre de Malte, et son Grand Prieuré Russe, Paris 1955, page 50.

=== Hereditary Commanders in exile 1928 ===
On June 24, 1928, twelve Russian Hereditary Commanders met in Paris to re-establish the activities of the Russian Grand Priory. They were supported by three other Russian nobles who were aspirants and admitted as Knights, and a Hereditary Commander of the Catholic Grand Priory of Russia.

The signatories of the founding document were (See Taube ibidem pages 52–53); Count Dmitri Cheremeteff; Prince Serge Belosselsky-Belozersky; Count Hilarion Worontzoff-Dachkoff; Paul Demidoff; Prince Wladimir Galitzine (Aspirant); Count Wladimir Borch (HC of the RC Grand Priory); Dmitri Boutourline; Prince Serge Dolgorouki; Denis Davydoff; Léon Narichkine; Count Alexandre Mordvinoff, (Aspirant); Prince Nikita Troubetzkoi; Count André Lanskoi (Aspirant); Dmitri Jerebzoff Nicolas Tchirikoff; Count Dmitri Olzoufieff.

Although Prince Nikita Troubetzkoy was counted as a Commander, and was a subsequent member of the Council, he was a distant cousin to the Prince Troubetkoy who qualified; Prince Cyrille Troubetzkoy. Baron Michael de Taube was aware of the mistake, and had met the qualifying Commander in Paris (Taube ibidem page 43).

By 1955, out of a possible 14 Commanders, only 6 were in membership of the Paris Group; Taube ibid page 50. Those families in membership are listed in italics, and the families where the direct descendants had come to an end, were signified by a Latin cross.

Under the guidance of Grand Duke Vladimir, applicants claiming to the Hereditary Commanders were carefully scrutinised, and those qualifying admitted under the signature of Grand Duke Vladimir – claimant to the Russian Throne.

The numbers of qualifying Commanders in membership of the Paris group continued to decline into the 1970s, and lines of several Hereditary Commanders coming to an end continued. For example, in 1974, Nicholas Tchirikoff, the Dean of the Paris Group died without an heir to the Commandery.

The Priory of Dacia in Denmark makes a claim to the tradition, (which was acknowledged as a legal part of the Union) but none met the original requirements.

=== Dissolution of the Union in 1975 ===
In recent years there has been speculation about the demise of the Paris Group, with a question about a possible dormancy of the institution - in other words whether a group of individuals could resurrect the institution, and thereby claim to continue it. If done, this would open the way to abuse of claims by such as the self-styled "Russian Orders". One group did exactly this in July 2006, connected to the self-styled Order the "Sovereign Order of Orthodox Knights Hospitaller Saint John of Jerusalem" created in 1977 but by so doing leaving themselves open to challenge by the Sovereign Military Order of Malta, who have proprietary rights over the phrase "St John of Jerusalem" in France (St Jean de Jerusalem).

The original Union ended with the death of its General Secretary General Georges Rticheff in 1975. Following this, the President of the Union, Grand Duke Vladimir (claimant to the throne) authorised a Bailiff of the Sovereign Military Order of Malta, to intervene in his "name and to help the Sovereign Military and Hospitaller Order of Saint John of Jerusalem, of Rhodes and Malta on any occasions which presents itself to act against the false orders, which, usurping the names belonging to the Sovereign Order of Malta, pretending themselves to be of Russian Imperial origin."

The Union Order founded in 1928, was via the Imperial Grand Dukes, Kirill, Alexandre, Andrei and Vladimir of 'Imperial origin'. The self-styled Orders claiming the Russian tradition, even with those of Russian descent, are clearly not of 'Imperial' origin.

== Hereditary Commanders of the Italian Tradition ==
Similar to those of the Russian Tradition of the Order of St. John, the grade of Hereditary Commander is a traditional entitlement within the Italian Order of Saints Maurice and Lazarus. These privileges were suspended in 1851, but restored when the order's constitution was revised in 1985.

== Hereditary Commanders of the French Tradition ==
In Feudal France, Hereditary Commanders (known in French as Châtelains) who governed castles without resident nobles acquired considerable powers, and the position actually became a hereditary fiefdom.

== Hereditary Commanders of the Spanish Tradition ==
In Spain during the Middle Ages and the early renaissance, Hereditary Commanders from noble houses were responsible for the managing the defense and leading the military forces of some cities. For example, Don Luis de Soto, was the Hereditary Commander of Cádiz during the British attack on that city in 1625.

== Hereditary Commanders of the Japanese Tradition ==
Shōgun is a traditional rank and historical title for Hereditary Commanders of military forces in Japan. The Japanese word is made up of two kanji words: shō, meaning "commander", "general", or "admiral", and gun meaning troops or warriors. It is the short form of Sei-i Taishōgun (征夷大将軍), the governing individual at various times in the history of Japan, ending when Tokugawa Yoshinobu relinquished the office to the Meiji Emperor in 1867.

== See also ==
- Baronet
