= Danmarks Adels Aarbog =

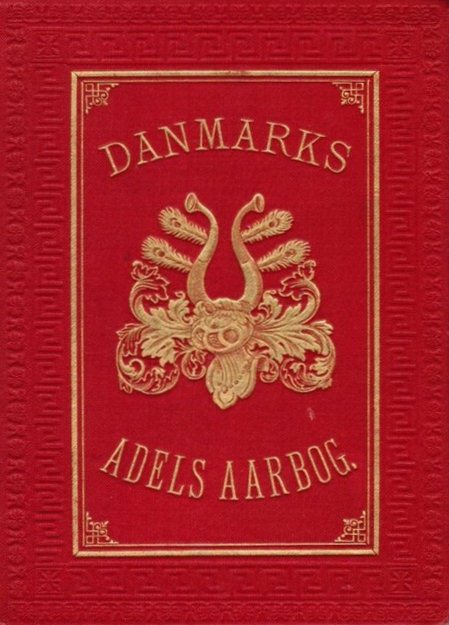
Cover of Danmarks Adels Aarbog (Yearbook of the Danish Nobility)

Danmarks Adels Aarbog (Yearbook of the Danish Nobility) is an annual – now tri-annual – publication that details the genealogies, titles, and coats of arms of Danish and Norwegian noble families. It was first published in 1884, making it one of the oldest such publications. The most recent volume, 2012–14, is volume 100 in the series, which has detailed more than 700 pedigrees. It is published by the Danish Nobility Association.

Each volume has a new version of the index of the families, that have a pedigree in DAA. The index was revised in vol 2012–14, and is on the net, link below.

Most volumes have a section of new corrections and additions to earlier pedigrees. So each pedigree may have a number of corrections scatter through the many volumes. The corrections should be consulted by users of a pedigree(!) All corrections and additions can be found on the Net, sorted by family name. Link below.
