= Black-Yellow Alliance =

Black-Yellow Alliance Die Monarchisten – Schwarz-Gelbe Allianz
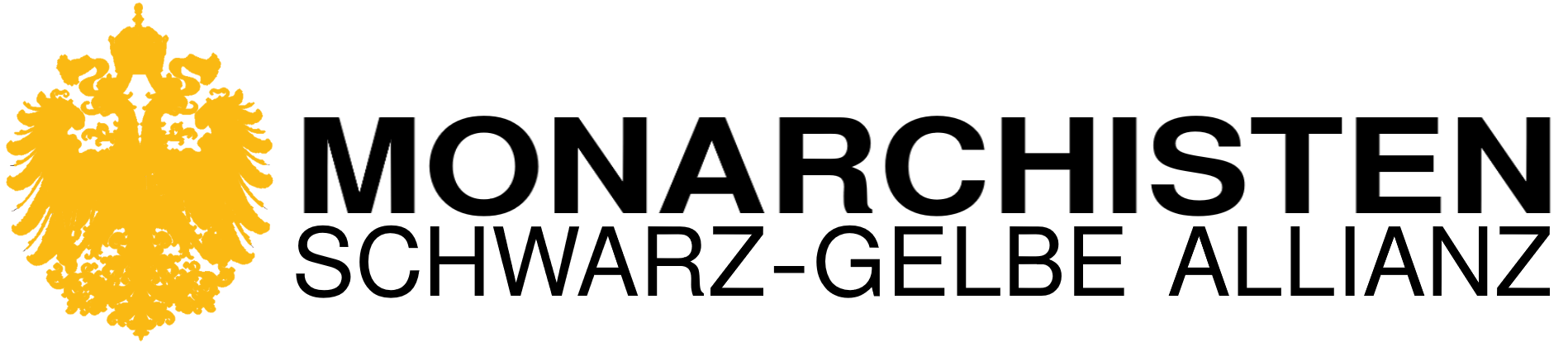
- Abbreviation: SGA
- President: Nicole Fara
- Vice President: Günther Kenyeri
- Founded: 6 August 2004
- Headquarters: Hermesstraße 70; 1130 Vienna
- Newspaper: Corona ~ Nachrichten für Monarchisten
- Student wing: Black Yellow students
- Ideology: Monarchism; Legitimism; Conservatism; Reactionism; Christian Democracy; Soft Euroscepticism
- Political position: Center-right to right-wing
- Colours: Black, Yellow
- Federal Council (Bundesrat): 0 / 60
- National Council (Nationalrat): 0 / 183

Website
- sga.monarchisten.org

Flag of the Habsburg monarchy and the Austrian Empire (used c. 1700–1867)

Scope of the new empire by SGA plan (Same as CEDC)

The Black-Yellow Alliance (German: Schwarz-Gelbe Allianz, SGA) is a monarchist movement in Austria founded on 6 August 2004. Its aim is the restoration of the monarchy in Austria with the House of Habsburg-Lorraine. They also advocate for a Central European monarchic union of the states which have emerged after the dissolution of Austria-Hungary.

== History ==
After more than 800 years of rule of the House of Habsburg, the Austrian monarchy ended after the Entente Powers won World War I, and a republic was introduced.

The Black-Yellow Alliance was founded on June 26, 2004 in Bad Ischl and registered in the Vienna register of associations on August 6, 2004 under the name "Schwarz-Gelbe Allianz". The association's registered office is in Vienna. The association's board currently consists of Nicole Fara as chairwoman and Günther Kenyeri as vice chairman.

The "SGA" attracted considerable political interest on November 12, 2007, the 89th anniversary of the founding of the Austrian Republic, when the movement presented itself to the public at Café Landtmann in Vienna. Heinz Christian Strache, the FPÖ federal party chairman, responded by raising concerns about constitutional and criminal law regarding the activities of the SGA in two different parliamentary questions to the then Minister of the Interior, Günther Platter (ÖVP), and the then Minister of Justice, Maria Berger (SPÖ). In both of their responses, the Minister of the Interior and the Minister of Justice saw “no reason to prohibit” the public appearance of the "SGA".

Politically, the Black-Yellow Alliance has not yet become very well established. So far, the "SGA" has only been active as a politically active association, not a true political party. Under the same name, the group tried to participate in the Austrian National Council election in 2008, but did not receive enough declarations of support.

During the 2010 Austrian presidential election campaign, the "SGA" made headlines again when they supported the efforts of Ulrich Habsburg-Lothringen in collecting statements of support for his presidential bid. The official patron of the "SGA" is currently Ulrich Habsburg-Lothringen.

== Political orientation ==
The aim of the "SGA" is to re-establish the Austro-Hungarian monarchy in the form of an international confederation of the former Austro-Hungarian crown states. The "SGA" sees itself as a supranational and non-denominational citizens' movement. One of the major goals of the SGA is a close alliance of the successor states of the Danube Monarchy.

The political program of the Black-Yellow Alliance includes points such as the constitutional restoration of the Habsburg monarchy in Austria and the return and re-legalization of noble titles in Austria. The Black-Yellow Alliance also supports the continued funding of the Austrian Armed Forces and the continued usage of mandatory conscription. The organization also espouses the tighter control of non-EU migration, as well as more government support of the traditional family unit.

== Leaders ==
- The president of the organization was tourism school professor Dr. Helga Vereno until 6 December 2013.
- As of 2017, the chairperson of the party is Nicole Fara.
