= Russian tradition of the Knights Hospitaller =

Charitable organizations

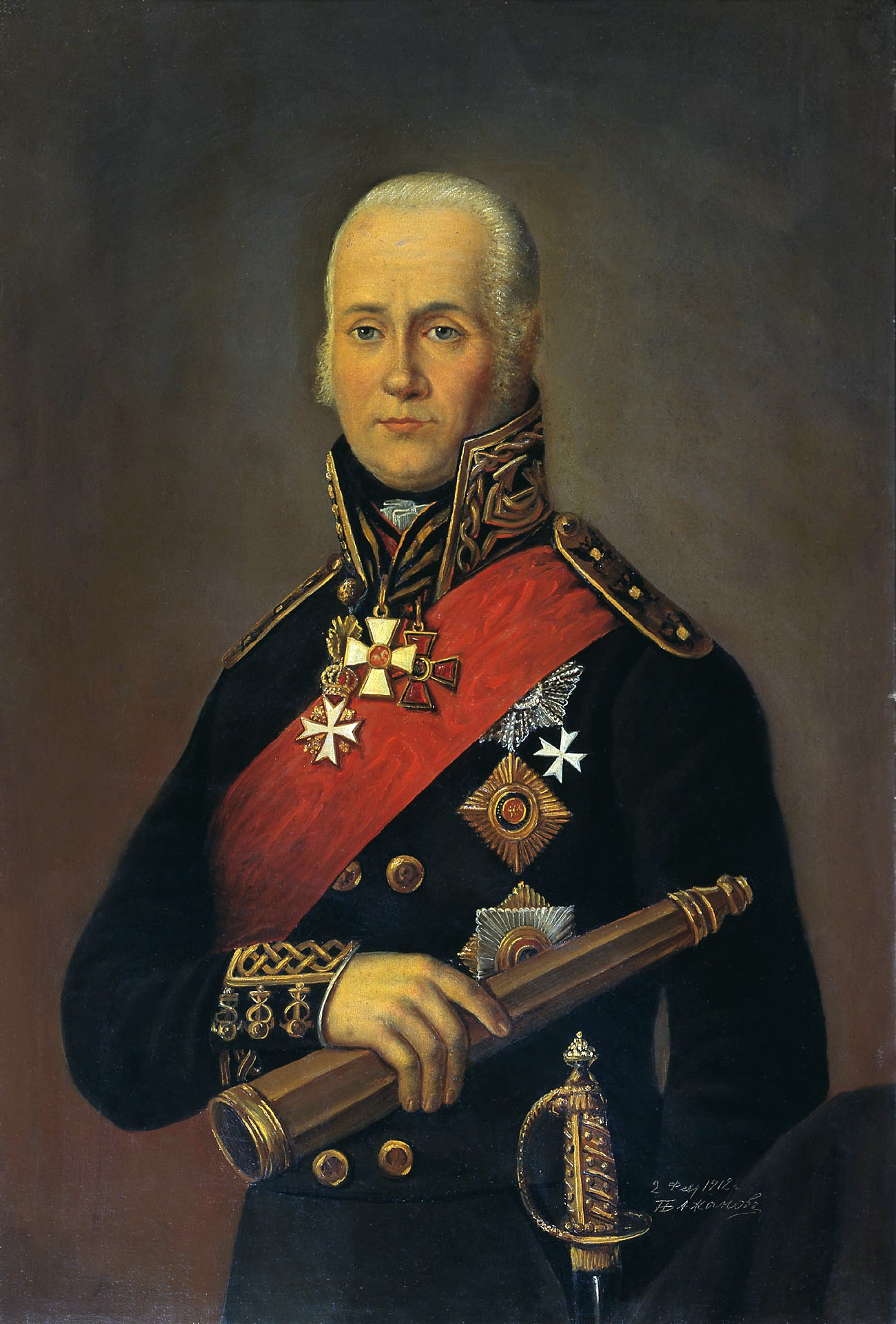
A portrait of Russian Admiral Fyodor Ushakov, Commander of the Black Sea Fleet. He is shown wearing the regalia of a Knight of Malta. The Knights moved to Russia during the times of the Revolution and Napoleon.

The Russian tradition of the Knights Hospitaller is a collection of charitable organisations claiming continuity with the Russian Orthodox grand priory of the Order of Saint John.

The order emerged when Malta was captured by Napoleon in 1798 during the expedition to Egypt. The Grand Master at the stronghold of Malta, Ferdinand von Hompesch, failed to anticipate or prepare for the threat. The Order continued to exist in a diminished form and negotiated with European governments for a return to power. The Emperor of Russia gave shelter to the largest number of Knights in St Petersburg and this gave rise to the Russian tradition of the Knights Hospitaller and recognition within the Russian Imperial Orders. In gratitude the Knights declared Ferdinand von Hompesch deposed and Emperor Paul I was elected as the new Grand Master. The continuous Order was also approved by the Papacy, but due to British fear of Russians establishing a presence in the Mediterranean and because many knights were Orthodox Christians, the Russian order was not universally recognized.

The organisations that claim to belong to the Russian tradition of the Knights Hospitaller are usually ecumenical, admitting baptized Christians from various Christian denominations.

== Origin ==
Blessed Gerard created the Order of St John of Jerusalem as a distinctive Order from the previous Benedictine establishment of Hospitallers (Госпитальеры). It provided medical care and protection for pilgrims visiting Jerusalem. After the success of the First Crusade, it became an independent monastic order, and then as circumstances demanded grafted on a military identity, to become an Order of knighthood. The Grand Priory of the Order moved to Rhodes in 1312, where it ruled as a sovereign power, then to Malta in 1530 as a sovereign/vassal power.

== 17th century ==
In 1698, Peter the Great sent a delegation to Malta under Field Marshal Boris Sheremetev, to observe the training and abilities of the Knights of Malta and their fleet. Sheremetev also investigated the possibility of future joint ventures with the Knights, including action against the Turks and the possibility of a future Russian naval base.

Before leaving Malta, Ambassador Sheremetev, established diplomatic relations and was invested as a Knight of Devotion of the order.

== 18th century ==
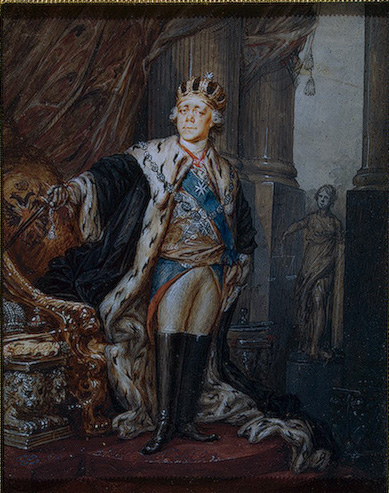
Emperor Paul wearing the Crown of the Grand Master of the Order of Malta (1799).

The special relationship between the Knights of Malta and the crown of Russia continued into the 18th century.

From 1766 to 1769, Catherine the Great sent many distinguished Russian naval officers for special training with the Knights of Malta.

From 1770 to 1798 there was a continuing presence of the Russian Navy among the Knights of Malta.

From 1772 to 1773, Grand Master Pinto sent Baillif Sagramoso as an ambassador to Russia, with the aim of maintaining the Order's cordial relationship with the northern giant.

In 1789, Bailiff Count Giulio Renato de Litta, while on an official visit from the Knights of Malta, assisted with the reorganization of Russia's Baltic Fleet, and later served as a commander with the Russian Imperial Navy in the war against Sweden.

In 1782, Empress Catherine sent her son Grand Duke Paul to visit Grand Master De Rohan as a gesture of her respect and admiration. The next year, she sent Count Psaro as an envoy to visit De Rohan in Malta to solidify her relationship with the Knights of Malta, and further Russian influence in the Mediterranean.

In 1797, Paul I, Emperor of Russia signed a Treaty with the Order of Malta, establishing a Roman Catholic Grand Priory of 10 Commanderies in Russia in compensation for the loss of income from the former Polish Grand Priory (of 6 Commanderies), which lay in the Polish territory annexed by Russia.

In 1798, following Napoleon's taking of Malta, the Order was dispersed, but with a large number of refugee Knights sheltering in St Petersburg, where they elected the Russian Emperor, Paul I as their Grand Master, replacing Ferdinand Hompesch then held in disgrace. Hompesch abdicated in 1799, under pressure from the Austrian Court, leaving Paul as the De facto Grand Master. Although Paul I was the leader of the Russian Orthodox Church, he assumed leadership of the order, which he structured as a Grand Priory with two divisions, a Catholic priory and an Ecumenical priory (for Lutherans and Orthodox Christians).

== 19th century – October Revolution of 1917 ==
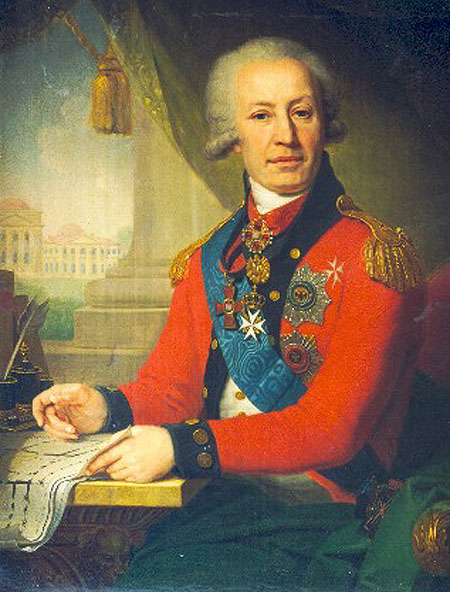
Count Vassiliev, a 19th-century Knight Commander, and Minister of Finance under Alexander I of Russia

In 1802, the mission of the Corps des Pages (founded in 1759 as a school for training chamber pages) was broadened to that of a military academy, based on the ideals of the Order of St John. In 1810, the school was moved to the palace of the Sovereign Order of St John of Jerusalem. It continued at this location in St. Petersburg for over one hundred years (until the revolution).

There is disagreement about what happened next. Following Imperial Decrees of Alexander I of Russia in 1810–1811, the properties of Russian Grand Priory of Russia was nationalized, and the property basis of the until then hereditary commanderies became non-existent. Proponents of the view that a separate Russian order existed, see this as if a fiscal and legal separation of the Russian tradition of St John from the main Roman Catholic HQ was created (The main motive of these decrees was financial as Alexander sought to reduce his father's lavish expenditures and build up a war chest for his struggle against Napoleon. As early as May 1802, Lord St. Helens (British Minister to the Court of Russia) informed the Hon. Arthur Paget (Envoy Extraordinary and Minister Plenipotentiary to the Court of Austria) that the Russian Emperor was going to make the Russian Priory "an independent and separate Community", which would have stripped "perhaps nine-tenths of the Revenues that constituted the Order’s principal income!" Although the Emperor did not take this action in 1802, by 1810, necessity forced the independence. Proponents of the survival claim that a Russian Order came to exist from 1810 and was akin to the German Johanniter Order, a Johannine tradition, but legally separate.

Opponents of the interpretation of this as a creation of a separate Russian order have argued that Emperor Alexander I abolished the Russian Grand Priory and/or the Order based on Decree for 1810, not least due to taking away the substance of the commanderies. Proponents say in return that is a bad misreading, misleading even Russian authors such as V.A. Durov. The Decree of 1810 Ukase 24.134 – 26 February 1810, which removed the Order's property, specifically states that the Order is still to continue, and that "All the expenses connected with the maintenance and running of the Order should be paid from the State Treasury" cited from the Ukase. Opponents argue that this reference is to the Order of Malta in Italy, which the emperor had recognized.

The Court Almanachs following that period still listed the Order of St John, listing as "protecteur" Alexandre Pavlovitch. In the 1813 Almanac the total membership of the Russian Grand Priory was 853, and the Catholic Grand Priory numbered 152. A further 21 members of the Order resided in Russia, providing in excess of a 1000 members.

However, there is no documentary evidence of any new members being admitted to any Russian order. There is also no evidence of any Russians fulfilling the requirements for membership of the order and succession to a commandery set out in the statutes issued by Emperor Paul. There is also no surviving evidence of any office holders of a Russian Grand Priory beyond 1810. Perhaps most tellingly there is no documentation that Emperor Alexander or his successors signed or styled themselves as protectors, grand masters or grand priors of any such institution.

A further decree was issued in 1817 forbidding Army Officers from wearing their decorations because they received them from outside of Russia from a foreign Bailiff of the Roman Catholic Order, which no longer officially existed in Russia by then. No such decree was ever issued concerning members of the non-Roman Catholic Russian Grand Priory, and in fact the reverse was true.

One of the leading French Bailiffs of the Military Order of Malta, who had studied the Russian tradition provided a footnote in his book; "Nevertheless, the Tsars have exceptionally authorised the eldest sons of the descendants of hereditary commanders to wear the decorations. Such an authorisation can be cited in the military service records of 19 October 1867.(De Taube. p. 43) One can also find the name of Demidoff, in his quality as hereditary commander in the Almanach de Gotha (1885, p. 467 and 1923, p. 556) and in the Almanach de St Petersbourg, 1913/14 p. 178" Pierredon, Count Marie Henri Thierry Michel de, Histoire Politique de l'Ordre Souverain de Saint-Jean de Jerusalem, (Ordre de Malte) de 1789 à 1955, Vol 2, page 197.

In the Division of Petitions of His Imperial Majesty's Chancery, for 1912, Record No. 96803 permission is given to Count Alexander Vladimirovitch Armfeldt to wear the insignia of the Order of St. John of Jerusalem, with the transfer of that right, after his death, to his son.

Portraits of Russian nobility wearing insignias of the Order of St John can be found throughout the 19th Century, with listings of members found in the Court Almanacs from the early 19th century through to the 20th Century.

It has been claimed that there is evidence of the Order's existence in Russia throughout the 19th Century on into the 20th Century; however, this is only through secondary evidence in handbooks, etc., and not primary sources. Some of these works include:

- Alzog, The Reverend Dr Johannes Baptist. Translated by The Reverend Dr F.J. Pabisch and the Reverend Thomas S. Byrne, Manual of Universal Church History, R. Clarke & Co. Cincinnati Ohio, 1874 Volume II.
- Brière, L. de la. a Knight of Malta, writing in L'Ordre de Malte, le Passé, le Présent, Paris, 1897.
- Burke, Sir Bernard (ed). The Book of Orders of Knighthood and Decorations of Honour of all Nations. Hurst and Blackett, London 1858.
- Chambers's Encyclopædia, W. and R Chambers, London 1863, Vol V. Page 729.
- De Taube, Professor Baron Michel. L'Empereur Paul I de Russie, Grand Maître de l'Ordre de Malte, et son Grand Prieuré Russe, Paris 1955.
- Karnovich, Eugeme, Knights of Malta in Russia, St Petersburg, 1880.
- Leiber, Francis (Editor) Encyclopædia Americana, Carey and Lea, Philadelphia, 1832. Volume XI.
- Loumyer, Jean Francis Nicholas, Histoire, Costumes et Decorations de tous les Ordres de Chevalerie et Marques d'Honneur, Brussels Auguste Wahlen 1844.
- Magney C de, Recueil Historique des Ordres de Chevalerie, Paris 1843.
- Maigne, W. Dictionnaire Encyclopédique des Ordres de Chevalerie, Paris 1861.
- Romanoff, Grand Duke Nicolas Mikhailovitch, Portraits Russes, St. Petersburg; Tome I, Fascicle 1, Fascicle 2, Fascicle 3, Fascicle 4, 1905, Tome II, Fascicle 1, Fascicle 2, Fascicle 3, Fascicle 4, 1906, Tome III, Fascicle 1, Fascicle 2, Fascicle 3, Fascicle 4, 1907, Tome IV Fascicle 1, Fascicle 2, Fascicle 3, Fascicle 4, 1908, Tome V Fascicle 1, Fascicle 2, Fascicle 3, Fascicle 4, 1909.
- Yate, Arthur C, The Future of Rhodes, article in the Journal of the Central Asian Society Vol. I, 1914 Part II, The Central Asian Society, London 1914.

== 20th–21st centuries ==
This Russian Hospitaller tradition of St John continued within the Russian Empire. Russian émigrés who went into exile following the Revolution in 1917 have attempted to keep the Order alive.

On 24 June 1928, a group of 12 Russian Hereditary Commanders met in Paris to re-establish the activities of the Russian Grand Priory. They were supported by three other Russian Nobles who were aspirants and admitted as Knights, and a Hereditary Commander of the Catholic Grand Priory of Russia. They came under the leadership of Grand Duke Alexander Mikhailovich to 1933, and Grand Duke Andrei Vladimirovich to 1956, both holding the title of "Grand Prior". In 1939, Grand Duke Andrei and the Council agreed to the creation of a Priory in Denmark; the Priory of "Dacia". On 9 December 1953, the Hereditary Commanders held a reunion in Paris and drew up a Constitution for the Russian Grand Priory in exile. In February 1955, the exiled Grand Priory based in Paris was registered as a Foreign Association under French Law as "The Russian Grand Priory of the Order of Saint John of Jerusalem."

Grand Duke Vladimir Kirillovich of Russia became the "Protector" to the Paris group in 1956, but refused the title of Grand Prior. Commander Nicholas Tchirikoff became the Dean of the Union until 1974. Prince Nikita Troubetzkoy became the remaining member of the council, which effectively signalled the end of the formal Paris group.

In 1958, a working title was adopted; "Union des Descendants des Commandeurs Hereditaires et Chevaliers du Grand Prieure Russe de l'Ordre de St Jean de Jerusalem". Although by 1975, with the death of the secretary, the original leadership had died out and the jurisdiction of the Paris Group came to a definite legal end; it is asserted that the tradition has been maintained by the Priory of Dacia, (which was acknowledged as a legal part of the Union) together with a number of descendants of the Hereditary Commanders associated with the Russian Grand Priory Association. In 1977, however, Count Nicholas Bobrinsky, along with several of the Hereditary Commanders, also claimed to maintain this tradition and became what is now known as the Orthodox Order of the Knights of St. John, Russian Grand Priory. This international philanthropic and chivalric group in the Russian tradition is based in New York, and has over 600 members including descendants of hereditary Russian nobility including several of the original Hereditary Commander families, as well as descendants of the House of Romanov and other Royal Houses, and has recognition as an NGO/DPI by the United Nations.

Paul I had created under Russian law, the Family Commanders of the Russian Grand Priory with Hereditary Rights. It is the descendants of these Commanders who have, with the support of members of the Imperial family, continued that Russian tradition in exile. In the latter days of the Empire and into exile, these were known as "Hereditary Commanders". The Commanders organised within the "Russian Grand Priory", a corporate organisation which existed under various names; "Association of Hereditary Commanders" (1928), "Russian Philanthropic Association of the descendants of the hereditary commanders of Sovereign the Order of Malta" (1929–1932), "Union des Commandeurs Hereditaires et Chevaliers du Grand Prieure Russe de l'Ordre de St Jean de Jerusalem" (1957–1958) and the longer "Union" title given above (1958–1975). Today various groups claim to be the continuation of the Russian Priory.

In July 2014, Maria Vladimirovna, Grand Duchess of Russia, a dynast of the House of Romanov and a leading claimant to the Russian Throne, whose claims are disputed by some members of the Romanov family, issued a statement through her Chancellery, disavowing and denying that any chivalric orders, or noble or hereditary commanderies, associated with the Order of St John survived Alexander I's decrees, citing the history of the Order of Malta in Russia, as well as Russian source documents.

== Self styled / mimic orders ==
The history of the survival of this tradition has been complicated by various mimic orders. The large passage fees (alleged in some cases to be in the region of $50,000) collected by the American Association of the Sovereign Military Order of Malta in the early 1950s may well have tempted Charles Pichel to create his own "Sovereign Order of St John of Jerusalem, Knights Hospitaller" in 1956. Pichel avoided the problems of being an imitation of the Sovereign Military Order of Malta by giving his organization a mythical history, claiming that it was founded by Russian Hereditary Commanders living in, or visiting, the US and dated to 1908; a spurious claim, but which nevertheless misled many including some academics. In truth, the foundation of his organisation had no connection to the genuine Russian tradition of the Knights Hospitaller. Once created, the attraction of a few exiled Russian nobles into membership of Pichel's "Order" lent some credence to his claims. This organisation and others have led to scores of other self-styled Orders. Two offshoots of the Pichel Order were successful in gaining the backing of two exiled monarchs, the late King Peter II of Yugoslavia, and King Michael of Romania.

== See also ==
- Order of Saint John of Jerusalem (Russia)
