= Russian Nobility Association in America =

- Formation: 1933; 93 years ago
- Founded at: New York City
- Type: Non-political, not-for-profit organization
- Purpose: To provide assistance to members of the former Russian Nobility
- Region served: United States of America
- President: John Pouschine
- Website: Official website

The Russian Nobility Association in America is a non-political, not-for-profit organization in the United States of America. It is the only American hereditary society that officially is a nobility association.

== History ==
The Russian Nobility Association in America was founded in New York City in 1933. Its original efforts were to provide assistance to members of the former Russian Nobility who had fled the aftermath of the Russian Revolution of 1917, the Russian Civil War of 1917–1922, and the Stalinist purges of the 1930s. The Association also became a resource for members of the Russian Nobility who fled Europe before and during the Second World War. As it exists today, the Association is a non-political, not-for-profit organization. Its goals are philanthropic, historical, and genealogical.

The Association provides donations to charitable organizations in the United States and in Russia that provide food, housing, and medical treatment for the disadvantaged, and provides direct aid to orphanages, the elderly and indigent, Orthodox seminaries and parishes, and others in need of resources.

Right to vote in the Association is restricted to direct male-line descendants of the Russian Nobility recorded in the Nobility Archives of the Russian Imperial Senate incontestably ennobled before March 15, 1917. The Russian Nobility Association has one other membership category for collateral descendants of these families.

== Charities assisted ==
Among many other charities assisted by the RNA, the following have been mentioned as receiving their support:

- St. Petersburg State Healthcare Institution Specialized Orphanage #4, St. Petersburg, Russia.
- St. Dmitry's Orphanage, Moscow, Russia.
- Fortuna Center of Rehabilitation, Fortuna, CA, USA.
- St. George's Pathfinders, Shadow Hills, CA, USA.
- Holy Trinity Monastery, Jordanville, NY, USA.
- The Tolstoy Foundation, Valley Cottage, NY, USA.
- The Foundation of Russian History, Jordanville, NY, USA.
- Russian Gift of Life, Sea Cliff, NY, USA.
- ARVO Foundation for Eye Research, Rockville, MD, USA.
- Russian American Cultural Heritage Center, New York, NY, USA.
- The Russian Orthodox Church Abroad, New York, NY, USA.
- Northwest Moscow Children's Center, Moscow, Russia.
- Radonezh Children’s Home, Radonezh, Russia.
- St. Petersburg Community Welfare Organization, St. Petersburg, Russia.

== Presidents of the Association ==
- Prince Alexis Obolensky (1933–1939)
- Mr. Vassilii Wadkovsky (1939–1941)
- Count Boris von Berg (1941–1942)
- Count Paul de Kotzebue (1942–1953)
- Gen. Prince Leonid Eletskoy (1953–1958)
- Prince Serge Beloselsky-Belozersky (1958–1963)
- Col. Peter Martynov (1963–1971)
- Prince Alexis Scherbatow (1971–2002)
- Dr. Cyril E. Geacintov (2002–2017)
- Prince Vladimir K. Galitzine (2017-2018)
- Mr. John Pouschine (2018- )
