= Danish Nobility Association =

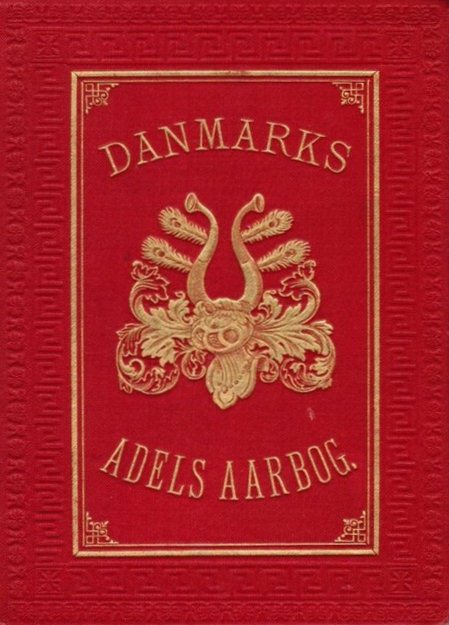
- The cover of Danmarks Adels Aarbog, the publication of which is the main purpose of the association.
- Abbreviation: DNA (Danish: DAF)
- Formation: 1983; 43 years ago 1908; 118 years ago (Dansk Adelsforbund)
- Merger of: Dansk Adelsforbund & The Association for the Publication of the Danish Nobility Yearbook
- Legal status: Association
- Headquarters: Copenhagen, Denmark
- Members: approx. 1000
- President: Anna von Lowzow
- Main organ: Board of Directors
- Website: https://adelsforeningen.dk/home

The Danish Nobility Association (or the Association of the Danish Nobility; Danish: Dansk Adels Forening, DAF) is an organization for the Danish and Norwegian nobility.

The main purpose of the association is the publication of the Yearbook of the Danish Nobility (Danish: Dansk Adels Aarbog), a publication that details the genealogies, titles, and coats of arms of Danish and Norwegian noble families. The Danish Nobility Association acts as an interest group on behalf of the Danish nobility, which has official status in the Kingdom of Denmark.

The association is a member of the pan-European umbrella-organisation for nobility, CILANE. The current President is Anna von Lowzow.

== History ==
The Danish Nobility Association was created by a merger of Dansk Adelsforbund (created in 1908) and the Association for the Publication of the Yearbook of the Danish Nobility (created in 1901). The merger took effect on 1 January 1983.

The Yearbook of the Danish Nobility was founded by archivist Anders Thiset and genealogist H.R. Hiort-Lorenzen in 1884, who around the year 1900, could not afford to continue the publication and who therefore turned to Baron Christopher Zytphen-Adeler, archivist in the Ministry of Foreign Affairs. He saw an opportunity to found an association that could be the voice of the nobility in turbulent times. In a way, it was opportune, for the change of system in 1901 had put a significant end to the established and reviled landlord system of the previous decades, which the nobility in particular had to suffer. And the nobility in particular feared the consequences of the June Constitution's promissory clause to abolish the majorats, i.e. the ties that had held counties, baronies and entailed estates together since the establishment of absolute monarchy by law in 1665.

Baron Zytphen-Adeler founded the "Association for the Publication of the Yearbook of the Danish Nobility" in 1901 with Tage lensbaron Reedtz-Thott as president. In 1907, Zytphen-Adeler further founded the "Danish Adelsforbund". The publisher of the present book is an amalgamation of these two associations, which in the 21st century have the dual function of protecting the interests of the nobility and publishing the Yearbook of the Danish Nobility.

== Sources ==
- Wilkenschildt, Merete (2017). Kongeligt leksikon [Royal Encyclopaedia] (in Danish) (1st ed.). Lindhardt & Ringhof. ISBN 9788711795033. OCLC 1188492162.
- Bisgaard, Lars; Jensen, Mogens Kragsig (2015). Adel - Den danske adel efter 1849 [Nobility - The Danish nobility after 1849]. Gads Forlag. ISBN 978-87-12-05088-9. OCLC 929455733.
