= Vereinigung der Deutschen Adelsverbände =

German association of nobles

The Vereinigung der Deutschen Adelsverbände (VdDA) is a German nobility association that consists of 23 branches and whose stated goals are to represent the nobility's interests in the public, encourage networking between the children of noble families, promote Christian values, and the preservation of noble assets.

== History ==
On February 26, 1874, the Deutsche Adelsgenossenschaft (DAG) was created by a small group of 30 North-German nobles, mostly as a counterweight to what the German nobility saw as the "liberalization" of society, to safeguard their interests, and they had plans to create a national registry for Prussian nobility. On March 7, 1883, Emperor Wilhelm I granted them the status of a legal entity. Women weren't allowed to be members until 1921. People who were excluded from membership were Freemasons, persons who had Black or Jewish ancestors before 1750, and people who were married or previously married to a member of these groups.

After World War I, the DAG lost much of its power because of the abolishment of nobility by the Weimar Republic's constitution and a large amount of their members dying in the war. They went from 2,400 members in 1914 to about 1,600 members in 1918. However, their membership began to increase with a much higher frequency than before the war, especially after allowing women to join. They reached 5,270 members in 1921, 8,938 in 1922, 11,268 in 1923, and 17,000 in 1926. The DAG swore an oath to Adolf Hitler and were forced to publish pro-Nazi propaganda in their publication Deutsches Adelsblatt. On November 22, 1943, the DAG's main building and central aid office in Berlin were destroyed in an air raid, destroying all the genealogical research there. Most of its other offices in other cities were also destroyed. By 1945, the DAG practically only existed in name, and after World War II the returning nobility attempted to operate the surviving branches of the DAG as their own independent groups for a short period. On May 15, 1956, the DAG was dissolved at the Hotel Luisenhof in Hanover by an emergency board, and its assets were transferred to the newly created Vereinigung der Deutschen Adelsverbände (VdDA). The VdDA also merged with a newly created post-war nobility group named the Arbeitsgemeinschaft deutscher Adelsverbände.

The VdDA is a founding member of the organization CILANE, which is an umbrella organization created in 1959 that helps the various noble associations of Europe work together to achieve common goals. Every country in Europe is only allowed one group as a member. The VdDA recreated the Deutsches Adelsarchiv (German Nobility Archives) in the late 1950s, and it was given non-profit status by the German government.

No official figures have ever been given on their total membership, but according to Count von Bernstorff, in 2011 there was about 25,000 members in the 23 branches.

== Branches ==
- Regional Associations
  - Vereinigung des Adels in Baden
  - Vereinigung des Adels in Bayern
  - Vereinigung des Historischen Adels in Berlin und Brandenburg
  - Vereinigung des Adels in Hamburg und Schleswig-Holstein
  - Vereinigung des Adels in Hessen
  - Vereinigung des Adels am Mittelrhein
  - Vereinigung des Adels in Niedersachsen
  - Vereinigung pommerscher Adelsfamilien
  - Der Historische Ostpreußische Adel
  - Vereinigung des Adels im Rheinland und in Westfalen-Lippe
  - Vereinigung des Adels an der Saar
  - Der Sächsische Adel
  - Vereinigung Schlesischer Adel
  - Vereinigung des Adels in Württemberg
- Knighthoods
  - Verband der Baltischen Ritterschaften
  - Verein der Althessischen Ritterschaft
  - Genossenschaft des Rheinischen Ritterbürtigen Adels
  - Schleswig-Holsteinische Prälaten und Ritterschaft
- Religious associations
  - Genossenschaft katholischer Edelleute in Bayern
  - Verein katholischen Adels Rheinland und Westfalen
  - Verein Katholischer Edelleute Südwestdeutschlands
  - Vereinigung katholischer Edelleute Schlesiens
