= Maltese nobility =

The feudal system was first established in Malta by the Kingdom of Sicily, which conquered the island between 1090 and 1091. The Sicilian titles were abolished after the Arab occupation of Malta. From 1530 to 1798 the island was ruled by the Knights Hospitaller (who became known as the Knights of Malta), and from 1800 to 1964 by the British. The Knights and the British both undertook to maintain the rights and privileges of the Maltese.

In the later nineteenth century the British government gave official recognition to several noble titles that had been created by the Grand Masters of the Knights of Malta and other fontes honorum. There were 29 title holders: nine marquises, ten counts and ten barons. The nobles were styled "The Most Noble" and took precedence among themselves according to the date of creation of their titles. Some nobles were also styled as "Illustrissimo", which was however, disputed by Grand Master Vilhena. In the Italian fashion, their heirs-apparent were styled marchesino, contino or baroncino, as appropriate.

Malta became an independent state in 1964 and a republic in 1974. Official recognition of titles of nobility by the Government of Malta were abolished in 1975. Even today, there are still descendants of Maltese noble families who live in Malta.
