= Hereditary Peerage Association =

British representative body

- Formation: 2002
- Founded at: House of Lords Act 1999
- Location: United Kingdom
- Official language: English

The Hereditary Peerage Association is a British representative body for hereditary peers in the United Kingdom formed in 2002 in the wake of the House of Lords Act 1999.

== Aims ==
It aims to provide a representative voice for hereditary peers thus attempting to clarify the rights of the remaining peers, and to protect the remaining rights and dignities of the hereditary peerage of the United Kingdom, and those peers whose titles derived from the former Peerages of Great Britain, and of Ireland, and to provide a forum for communication and debate of matters of common concern for members of the peerage. It seeks to maintain a common bond between hereditary peers through its active social events, and to protect and promote the heritage which they collectively represent in a "somewhat unlikely trade union."

In November 2003, the Hereditary Peerage Association responded to the white paper Constitutional Reform: next steps for the House of Lords, expressing opposition to the proposed removal of the then 92 remaining hereditary peers. On 13 March 2007 Flora Fraser, 21st Lady Saltoun suggested that the Hereditary Peerage Association could give advice on candidate selection in Peers' elections.

== Membership ==
Membership is open to all hereditary peers, with associate membership open to their heirs.

The Joint Chairmen are Viscount Torrington and Lord Newall, the committee being composed of Lord Newall as well as Lord Kilmaine, Lord St. Oswald, the Earl of Erroll, Viscount Trenchard and Lord Glanusk.

== Events ==
The HPA is active through an array of social events, including a monthly luncheon. On 28 February 2006 Windsor Herald William Hunt spoke on the subject of the Roll of the Peerage before an HPA luncheon.
