= Heraldic fraud =

Confabulating heraldic history to gain prestige or money

A typical piece of "bucket shop" heraldic artwork, which would be referred to as the "Morris family crest"

Heraldic fraud may mean either to falsely claim the right to a coat of arms (or other component of heraldic display) for oneself, or to falsely assert that someone else has that right in order to sell heraldic art to them. Both can be seen as a kind of fraud and an infringement of intellectual property rights.

== Fraudulent armigers ==
According to the law of arms in most heraldic jurisdictions, usage of a pre-existing coat of arms must be predicated on a specified form of family relationship. Typically, inheritance of arms flows through the male line, though in some jurisdictions it may under some circumstances flow through the female line as well. Many regions of the world have no official regulation of heraldic matters, so no distinction can be made between fraudulent and legitimate uses on the basis of legality.

== Fraudulent heraldic artists ==
In the United States, businesses selling heraldic memorabilia have existed since at least the 1880s.

The term "bucket shop" is sometimes used to refer to a company that will sell a coat of arms (often referred to by the misnomer "family crest") associated with the customer's surname, regardless of whether the customer can actually claim a relation to the original armiger. Bucket shops may work from a database of surnames and shields sourced from manuscripts, armorials, and various journals. Halberts Inc., a large 20th-century bucket shop, went as far as fabricating new arms for surnames which had none.

A common indicator of "bucket shop" arms is the display of the surname within what should be the motto scroll.

== Legislation ==
At least one country has passed legislation to clamp down on "bucket shops". In South Africa, it has been an offence since 1980 to furnish someone with a so-called "family coat of arms" without first obtaining a certificate from the State Herald at the Bureau of Heraldry to confirm that the arms are authentic. Non-compliance can result in prosecution, the prescribed penalties being a fine and/or imprisonment.

== See also ==
- Plagiarism § In other contexts
- High Court of Chivalry
- Lord Lyon King of Arms
