= Legitimists (disambiguation) =

Legitimists may refer to:

- Legitimists, Royalists in France who believe that the King of France and Navarre must be chosen according to the simple application of the Salic Law
- Monarchists, Austrian Legitimists who considered Otto von Habsburg the rightful head of state after the end of the Dual Monarchy
- Jacobitism, the political movement dedicated to the restoration of the Stuart kings to the thrones of England and Scotland
- Carlists, a traditionalist, legitimist political movement in Spain seeking, among other things, the establishment of a separate line of the Bourbon family on the Spanish throne
- Miguelistas, legitimists of Portugal
- Legitimist Party (Nicaragua)
- Irish republican legitimism
