= Scheibler Armorial =

The so-called Scheibler Armorial (Scheiblersches Wappenbuch, Bayerische Staatsbibliothek, Cod.icon. 312 c) is an armorial manuscript compiled, in two separate portions, over the course of the 15th to 17th centuries. It is named for its first known private owners, the baronial Scheibler family of Hülhoven in the Rhineland.

The first part can be dated to the later 15th century, ca. 1450–1480. It contains a total of 476 coats of arms. The second part, compiled during the 16th to early 17th centuries, adds 148 additional complete coats of arms, for a total of 624, not including 62 delineated coats of arms left empty. Page numbers and a register in alphabetic order were added in the late 17th century.

The collection includes coats of arms of noble families from much across the Holy Roman Empire, predominantly its southern areas, categorised as Bavaria, Swabia and Alsace, Franconia, the Rhineland and the Low Countries, Saxony, Meissen and Silesia, Austria, Styria, Tyrol, Turgovia and Raetia Curiensis. The younger part introduces the additional, more specific categories of Hegau, Lake Constance, Swiss, Breisgau, Allgäu, Westphalia, Walgau, Moravia and Bohemia.

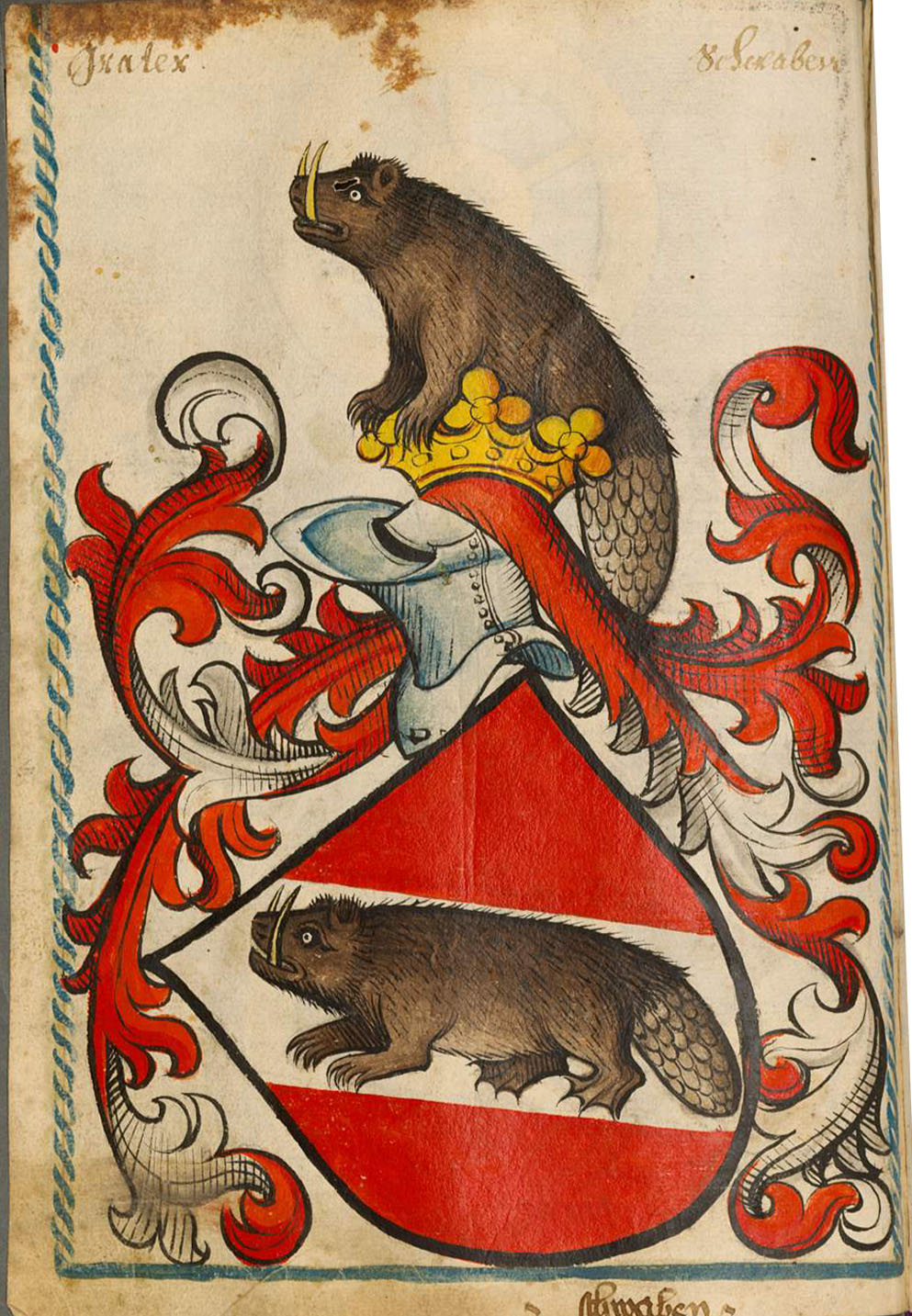
Grater (Swabia), p. 114

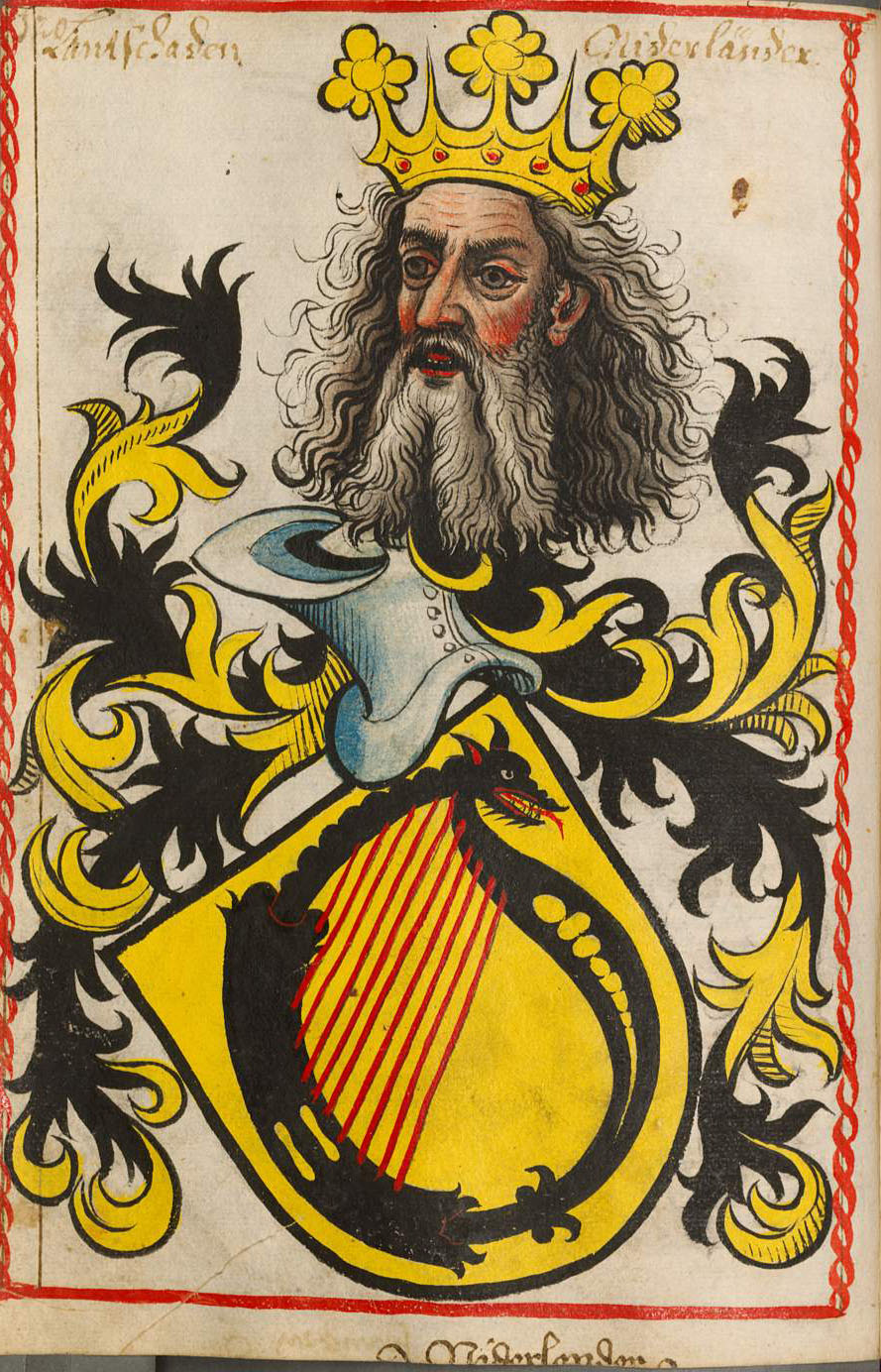
Landschaden (Low Countries), p. 120

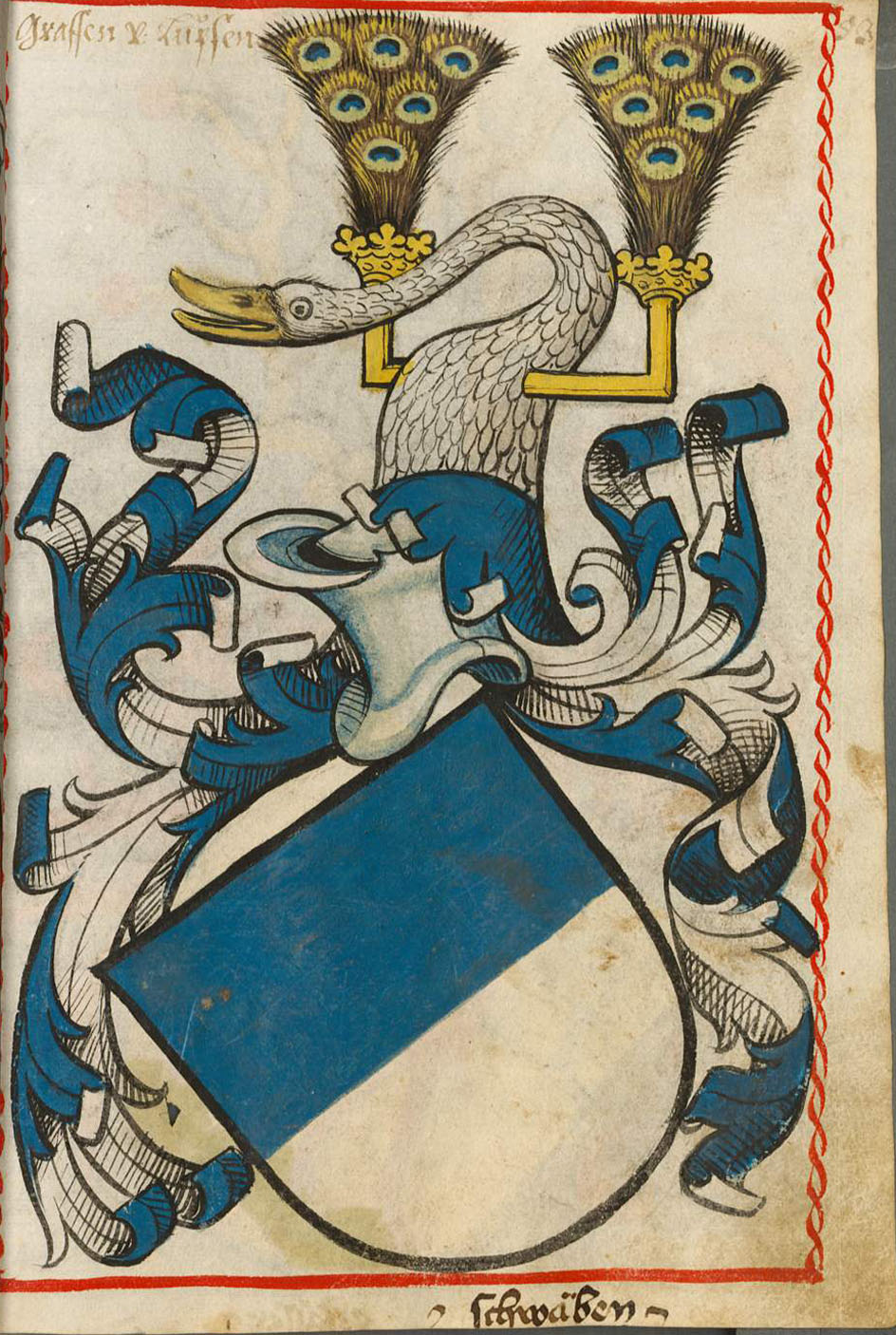
Lupfen (Swabia), p. 312

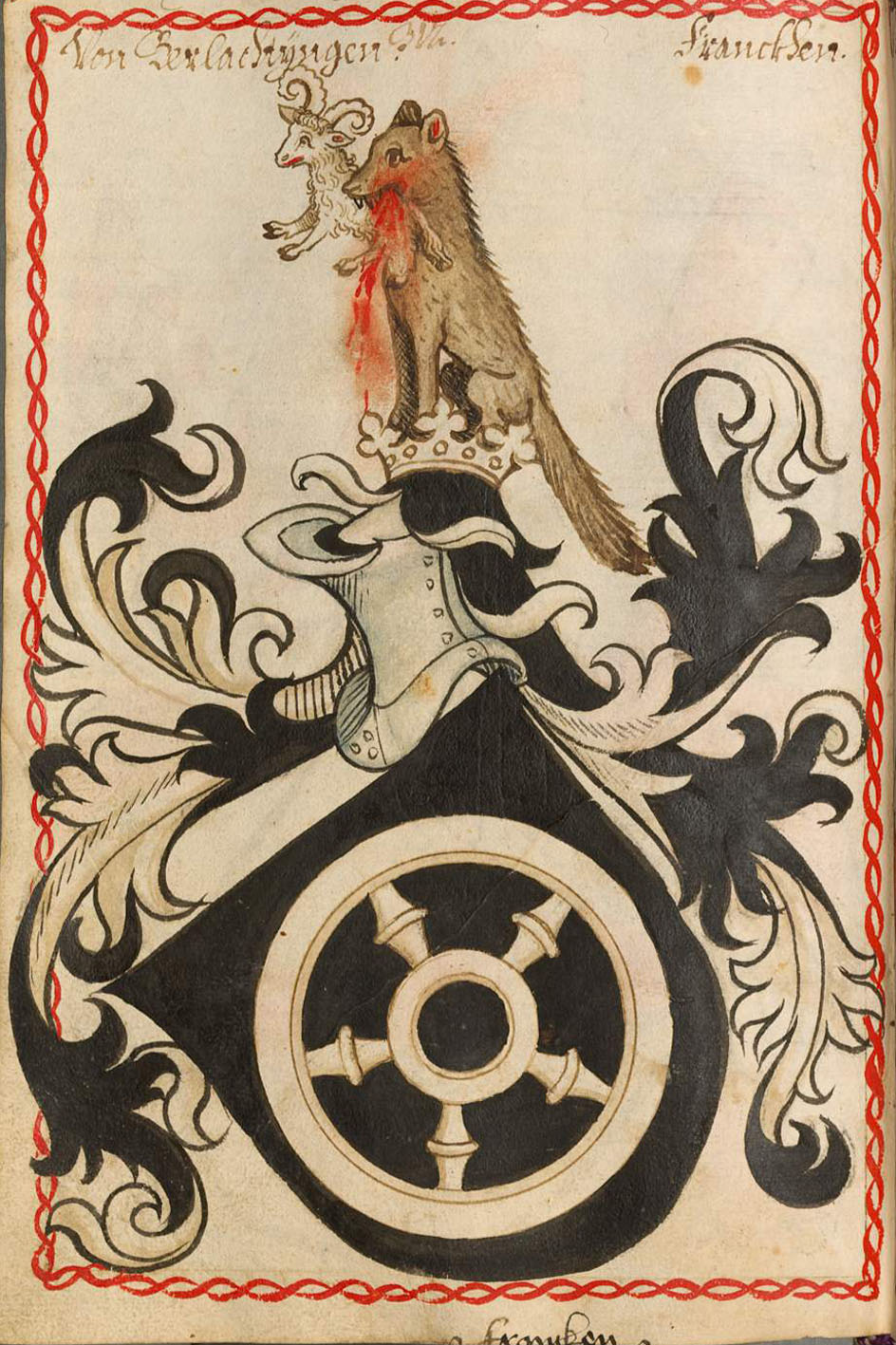
Berlichinen (Franconia) p. 312

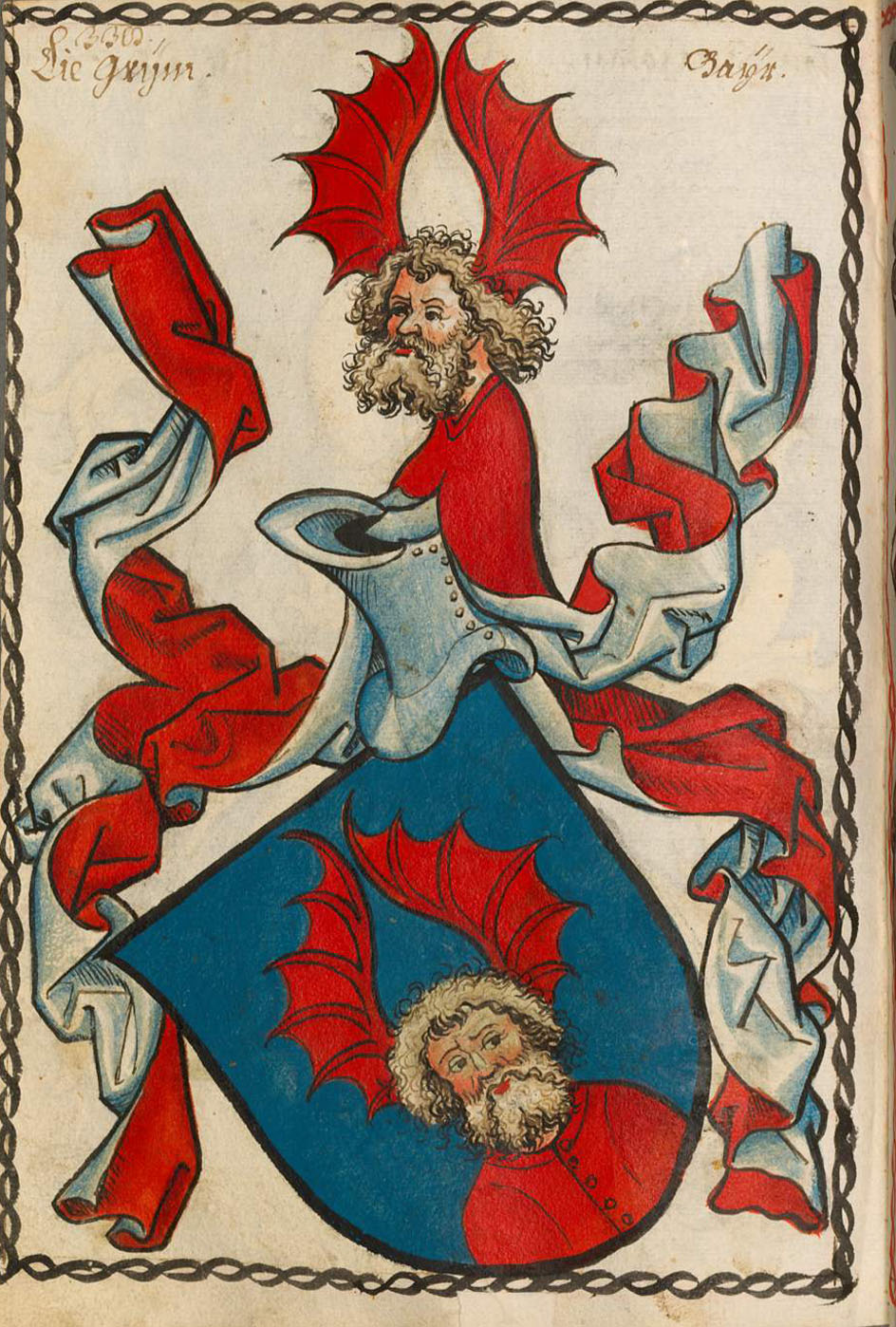
Grym (Bavaria), p. 338

== See also ==
- Heraldry of the Holy Roman Empire
- BSB cod. icon. 326
- Livro do Armeiro-Mor
