= Galloway Roll =

14th century English roll of arms

The Galloway Roll is an English roll of arms dating from the reign of King Edward I of England, drawn up during his Scottish campaign of 1300, containing 259 coats with blazons. It does not include the Earl of Warenne's division nor the king and his son.
