= Beyeren Armorial =

15th century Dutch roll of arms

- National Library of the Netherlands, signature KB 79 K21
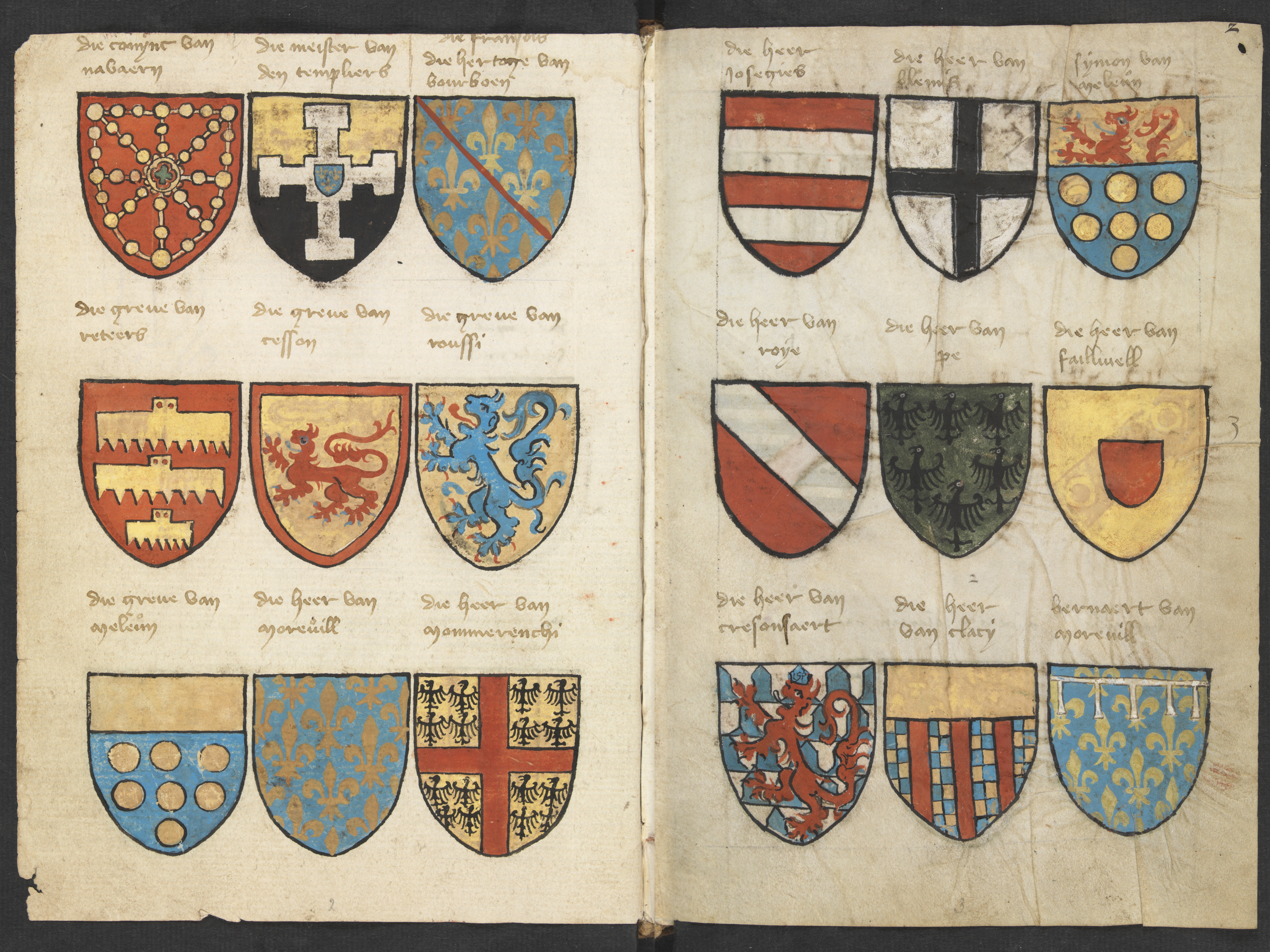
- First page spread (foll. 1v–2r) of the Beyeren Armorial
- Type: Armorial
- Date: Between 1402 and 1405, the book was completed on 23 June 1405. Binding is from 1581
- Place of origin: Holland, The Hague
- Language: Annotations in Dutch
- Author: Claes Heynenzoon
- Material: Parchment and paper
- Size: 62 folia
- Format: Circa 230 x 155 mm
- Script: Littera cursiva
- Contents: Five series: 1. (fol. 1r-8v, 18r-28v): 337 coats of arms from participants in a tournament in Compiègne; February 1238; 2. (fol. 28v-35v, 49r-52v): 191 coats of arms from participants in a tournament in Mons; 1310; 3. (fol. 52v-57v, 36r-48v, 9r-13r): 404 coats of arms from participants in a raid against the Frisians in Kuinre; 1396; 4. (fol. 13r-17v, 58r-60r): 122 coats of arms from participants in the siege of Gorinchem; 1402; 5. (fol. 60r-62v): 14 series of The Three Best
- Illumination: 1096 hand-colored coats of arms
- Accession: Description of the Beyeren Armorial in the catalogue of the KB]
- Other: KB Website: Description (ENG) Digitized version

The Beyeren Armorial is a manuscript roll of arms of the early 15th century, containing 1096 hand-colored coats of arms, with annotations in Middle Dutch. It is held by in the National Library of the Netherlands in The Hague (KB), shelf mark 79 K 21.

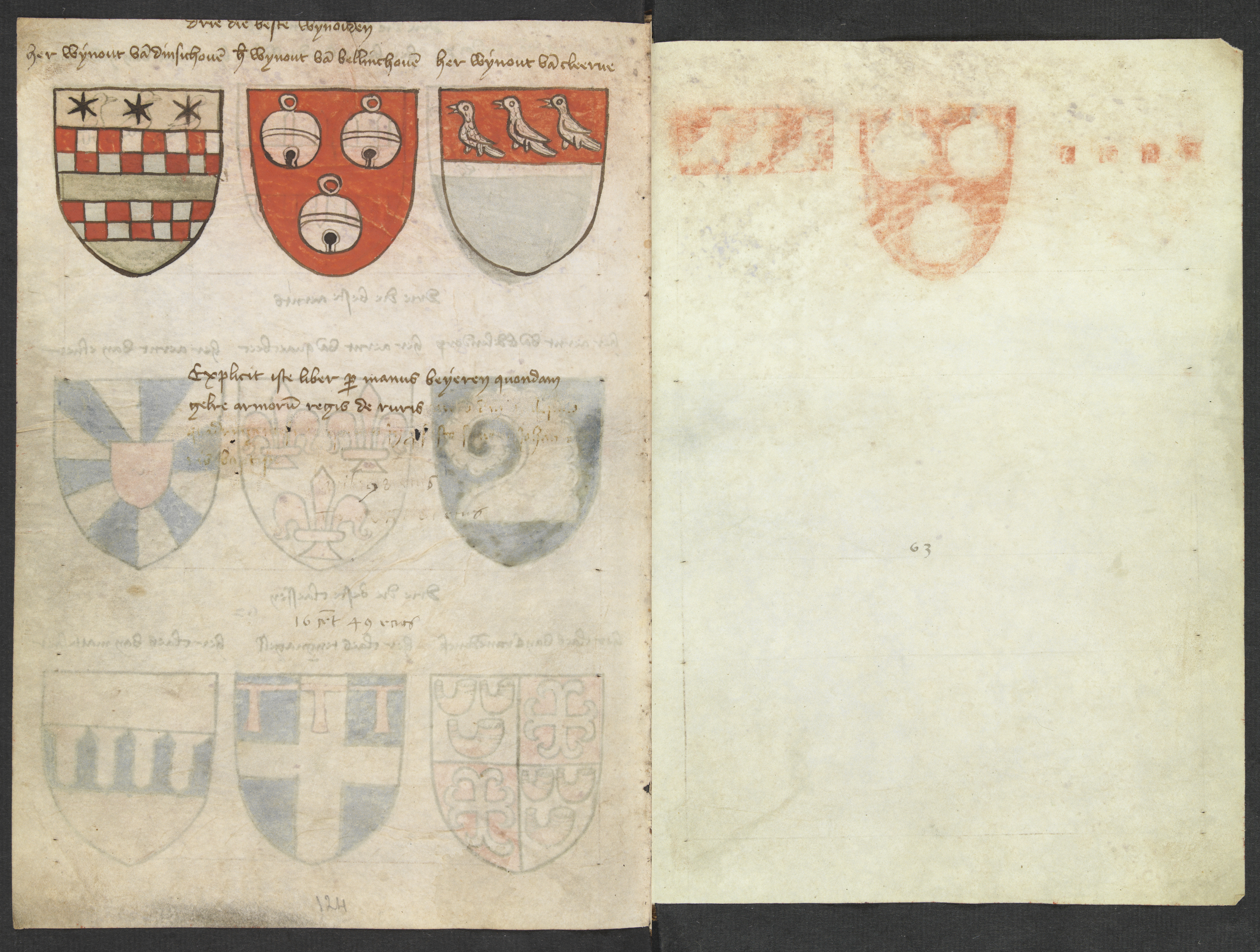
On the left folio it is stated that the book was completed on 23 June 1405: Explicit iste liber per manus beyeren quondam gelre armorum regis de ruris [anno domini milesimo quadringentesimo quinto in profesto sancti Johannis baptiste]. Translation: Here endeth this book by the hand of Bavaria, formerly Guelders, Ruwieren King of Arms [in the year of our Lord one thousand four hundred and five on the day before Saint John the Baptist's Day]

== History ==
The manuscript was compiled at the court of Holland and was completed on 23 June 1405 by Claes Heynenzoon (c.1345−1414). He was Ruwieren King of Arms, the chief herald of the Netherlands around 1400. He is also the creator of the Gelre (Guelders) Armorial, for which he has also been referred to as the "Gelre Herald".

== Contents ==
The manuscripts is divided into 5 series or chapters

- I (fol. 1r–8v, 18r–28v): 337 coats of arms from participants in a tournament in Compiègne, "February 1238" [mccxxxviii]: the indicated date is likely in error (as many of the coats of arms would be anachronistic), perhaps 1278 [mcclxxviii] is intended (the coat of arms of the king of Sicily is that of Anjou, for Charles I, r. 1266–1285); the Luxembourg lion for "Henry of Luxembourg" would then be in reference to Henry VI (1240–1288), father of emperor Henry VII.
- II (fol. 28v–35v, 49r–52v): 191 coats of arms from participants in a tournament in Mons; 1310
- III (fol. 52v–57v, 36r–48v, 9r–13r): 404 coats of arms from participants in a raid against the Frisians in Kuinre; 1396
- IV (fol. 13r–17v, 58r–60r): 122 coats of arms from participants in the siege of Gorinchem; 1402
- V (fol. 60r–62v): 14 series of The Three Best, by given name ("the three best Johns", "the three best Williams", etc.)

Fol. 64v has a doodle of heart symbols pierced by arrows with the maxim Wacht u, dool ich ("you wake, I sleep").
