= Camden Roll =

13th-century English roll of arms

The Camden Roll is a 13th-century English roll of arms believed to have been created c. 1280, containing 270 painted coats of arms with 185 French blazons for various English and European monarchs, lords and knights.

The original roll is now held at the British Library as Cotton Roll XV. 8. It consists of three vellum membranes in total measuring 6.25" by 63". The face of the roll consists of 270 painted shields arranged in 45 rows of six shields, each with associated names and/or titles listed above each shield. The dorse includes French blazons for 185 of the shields on the face.

== Provenance ==
The roll belonged to William Camden, Clarenceux King of Arms, c. 1605, and is believed to have been among several documents and manuscripts which were willed to Sir Robert Cotton in 1623. In 1700 Sir John Cotton, Sir Robert's grandson, sold the Cottonian library to the nation, and in 1753 the collection was granted to the British Museum in London.

== Contents ==
The coats on the face of the roll are loosely divided into the following sections:

- Shields 1–18: Emperors and kings
- Shields 19–24: Foreign dukes
- Shields 25, 27, 29, 30, 34, 36, 37: English earls
- Shield 26: "Sire Aunfour" (Alphonso of England, Earl of Chester, eldest son of Edward I)
- Shield 28: "Prince of Gales" (Prince of Wales)
- Shields 31–3, and 35: Foreign counts
- The rest are those of English lords and knights, with the following exceptions: 44–51, 54, 56–61, 71–2, 83, 88, 94, 102, 181, 184, 207–8, 226, 240, 243, 246, 256–67, 270

The blazons, written in French on the dorse, are of shields 1–202, with a small number of omissions: these include nos 9 "Rey de Escoce" (King of Scotland) and 86 "Johan Giffard" (John Giffard).

== Copies ==
16th Century

- A. Held at Queen's College, Oxford, MS 158, pp. 349–65. Tricked by Robert Glover, Somerset Herald.
- B. Held at the College of Arms, Vincent MS 164, fols. 111–19. Trick attributed to Richard Scarlett.
- C. Held at the British Library, Harley MS 6137, fols. 66b–72b. Tricked by Richard Kimbey.

17th Century

- D. Held at the College of Arms, MS L 14, fols. 62–70. Trick attributed to Nicholas Charles, Lancaster Herald.

== Illustrations ==
Below are a series of modern illustrations of the arms in the roll, based on the list of blazons published by James Greenstreet in 1882.

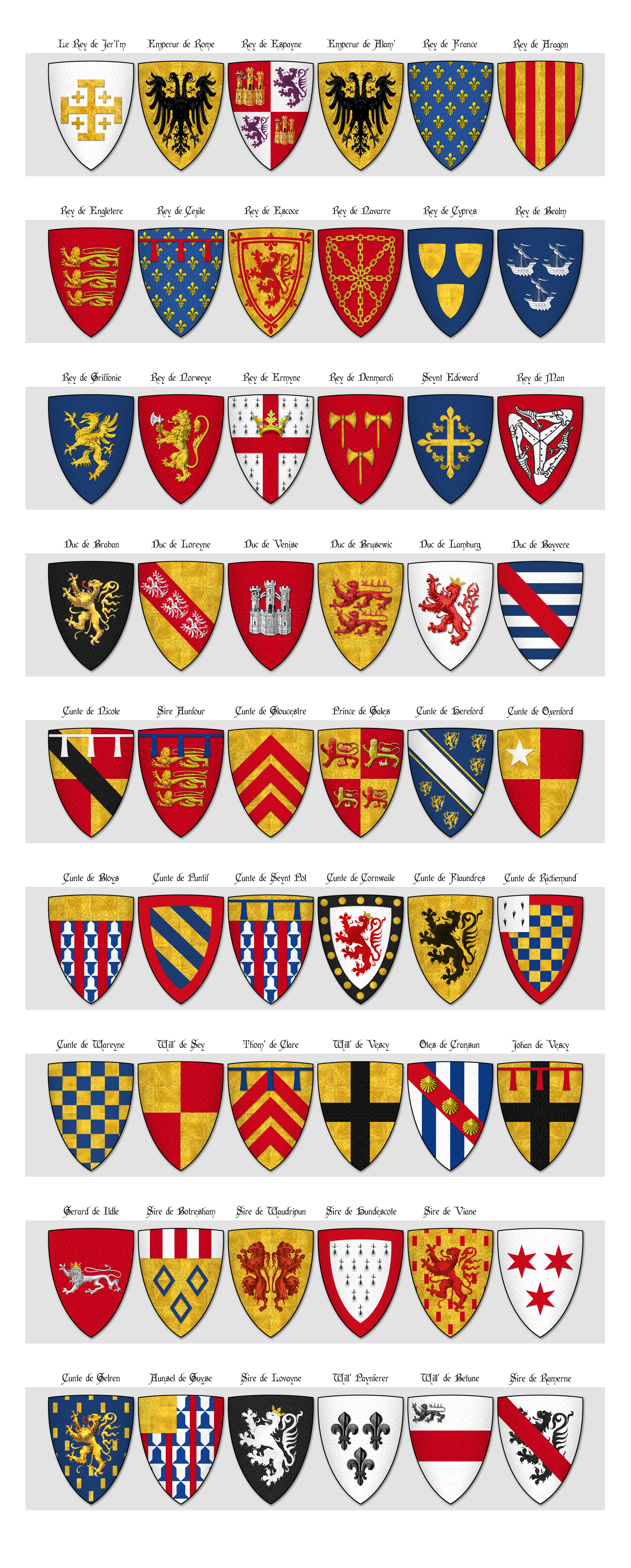
Panel 1 – shields 1 to 54

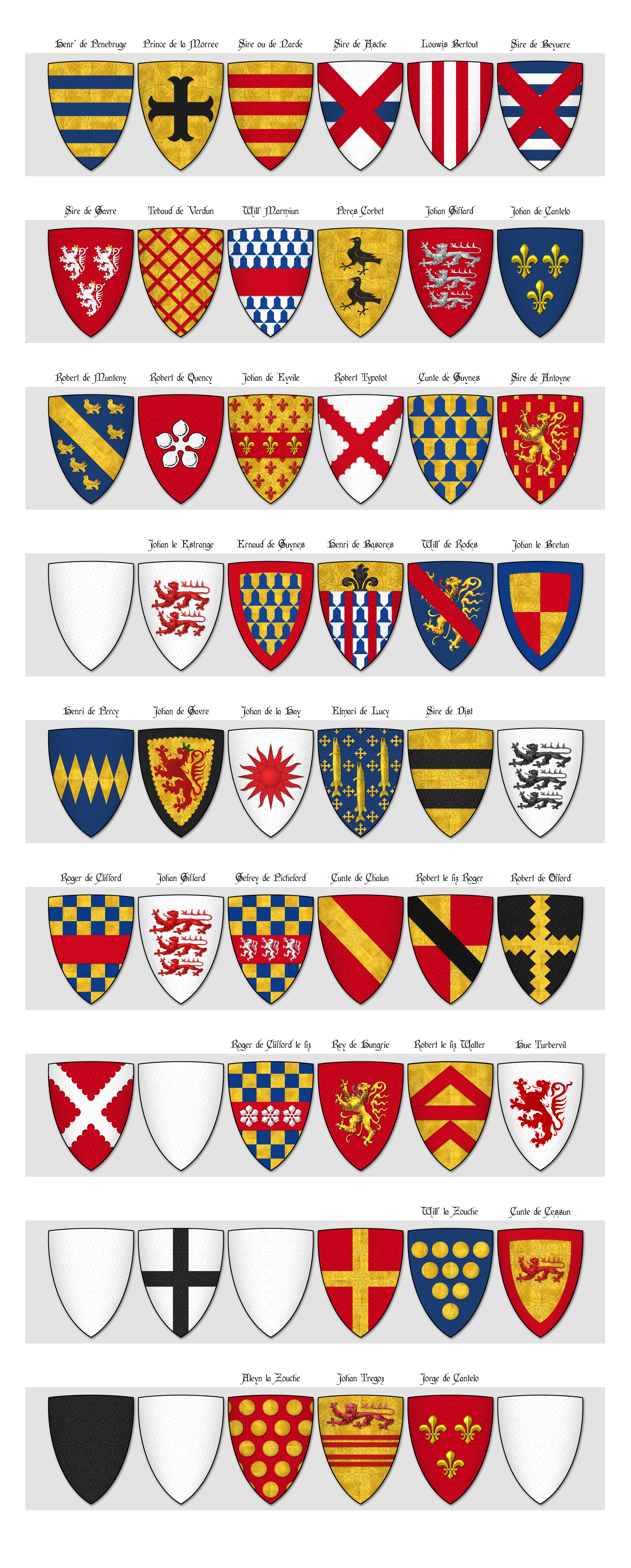
Panel 2 – shields 55 to 108

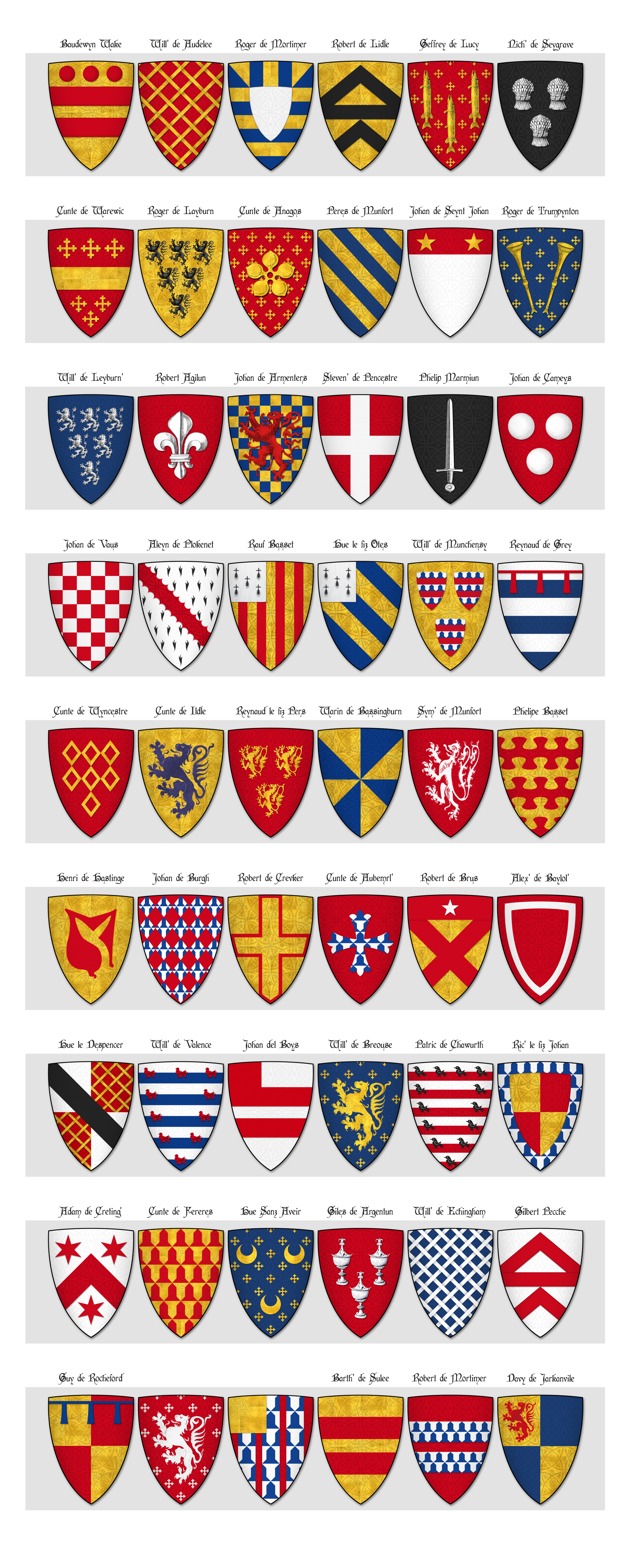
Panel 3 – shields 109 to 162

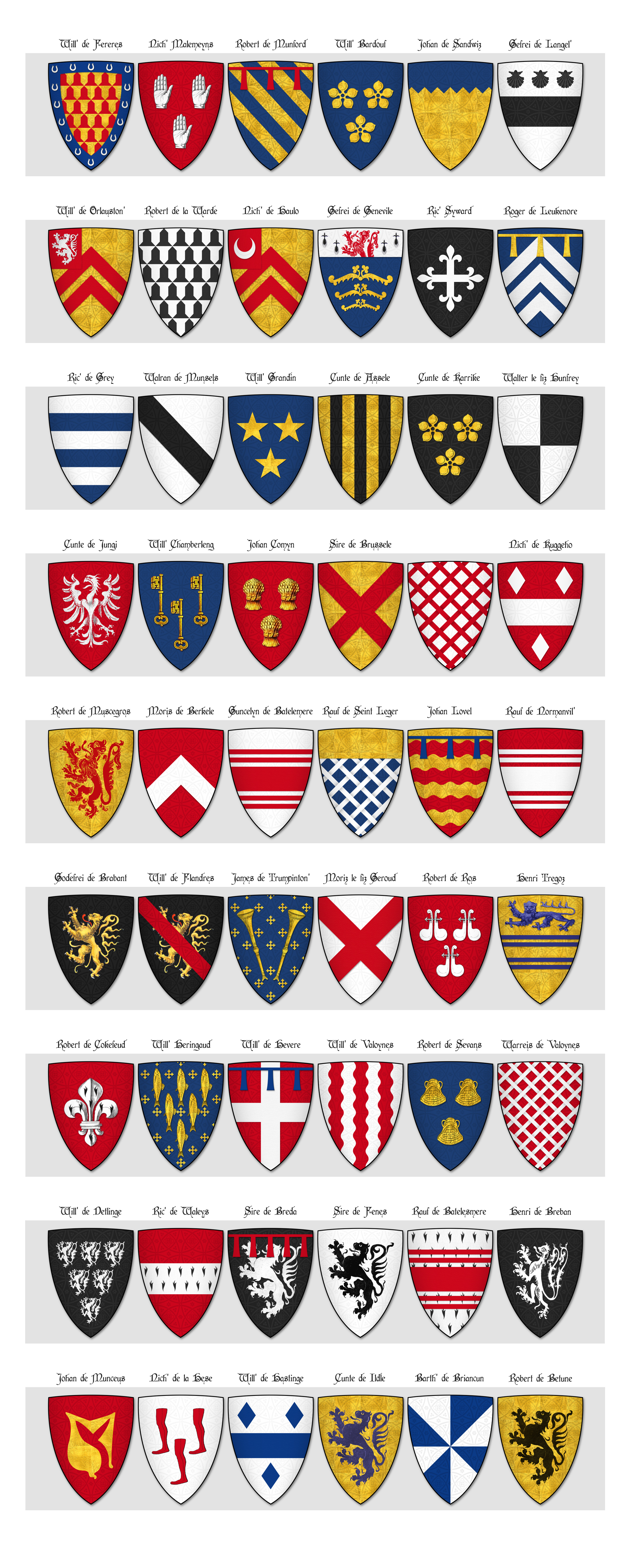
Panel 4 – shields 163 to 216

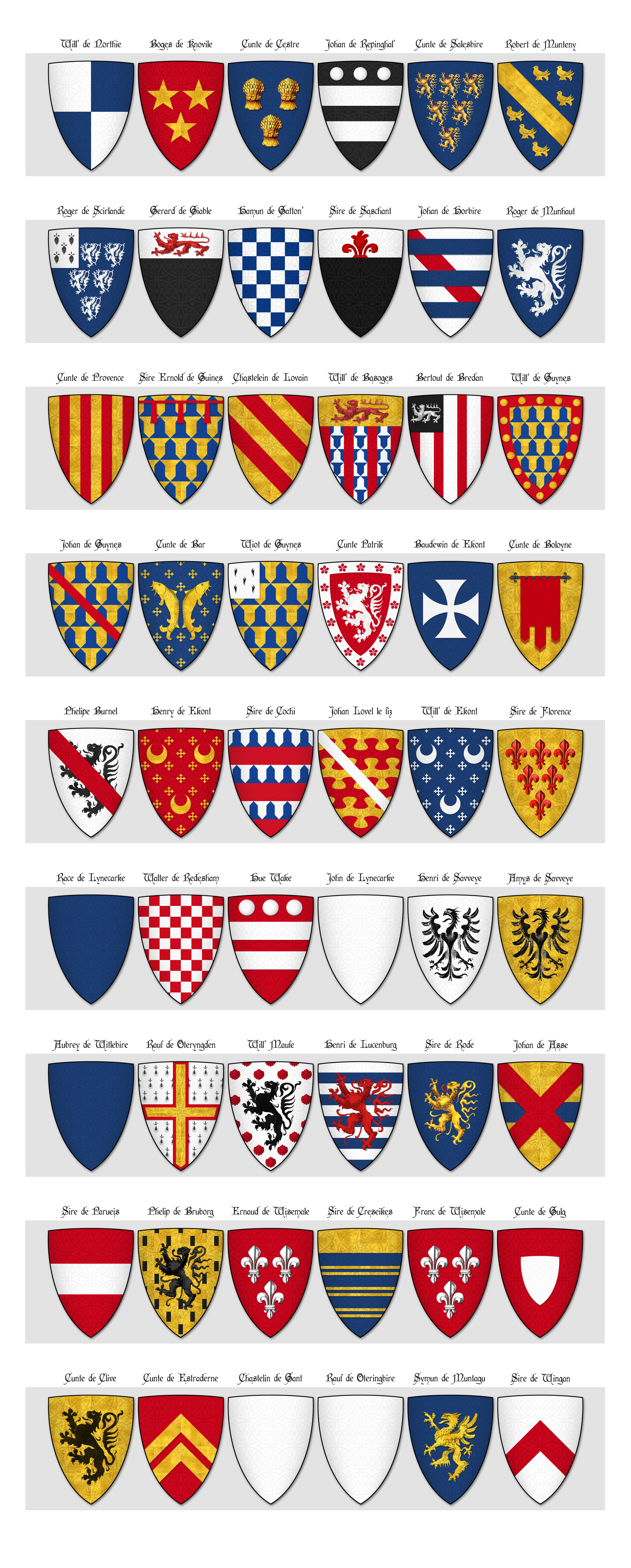
Panel 5 – shields 217 to 270
