= Armorial of Little Russia =

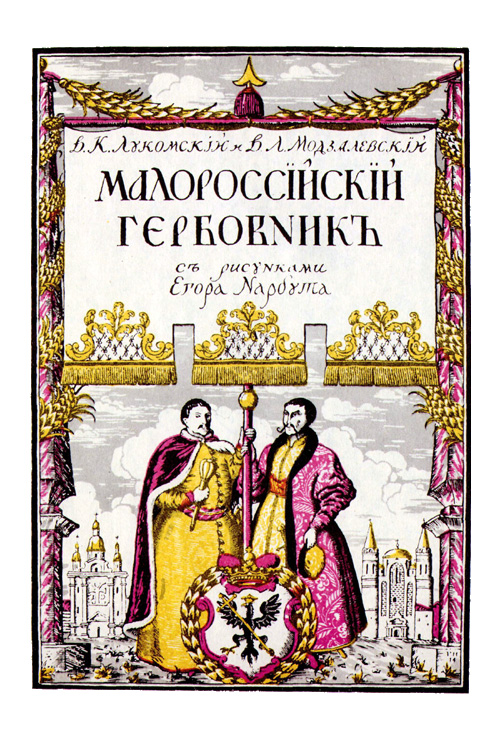
The cover of the Armorial of Little Russia

Armorial of Little Russia (pre-reform Russian: Малороссїйскїй гербовникъ) is an armorial of noble Ukrainian (Little Russian) families from the Russian Empire. It was published in 1914, in Saint Petersburg, by the nobility of Chernigov Governorate. The Armorial was edited by Russian historian Vladislav Lukomski and Ukrainian historian Vadym Modzalevski, and illustrated by Ukrainian artist Heorhiy Narbut. It contains images and description of 700 coats of arms of Ukrainian, predominantly Cossack, families.

== Gallery ==
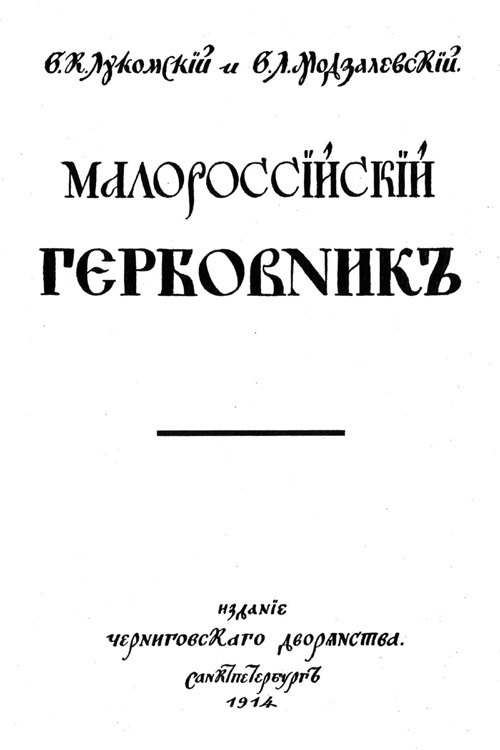
Title page

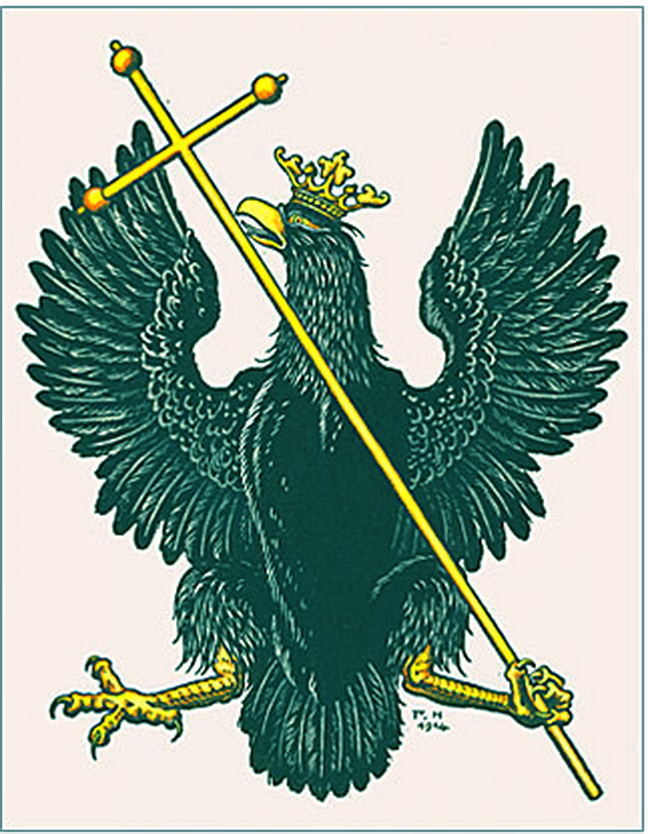
Arms of Chernigov Governorate

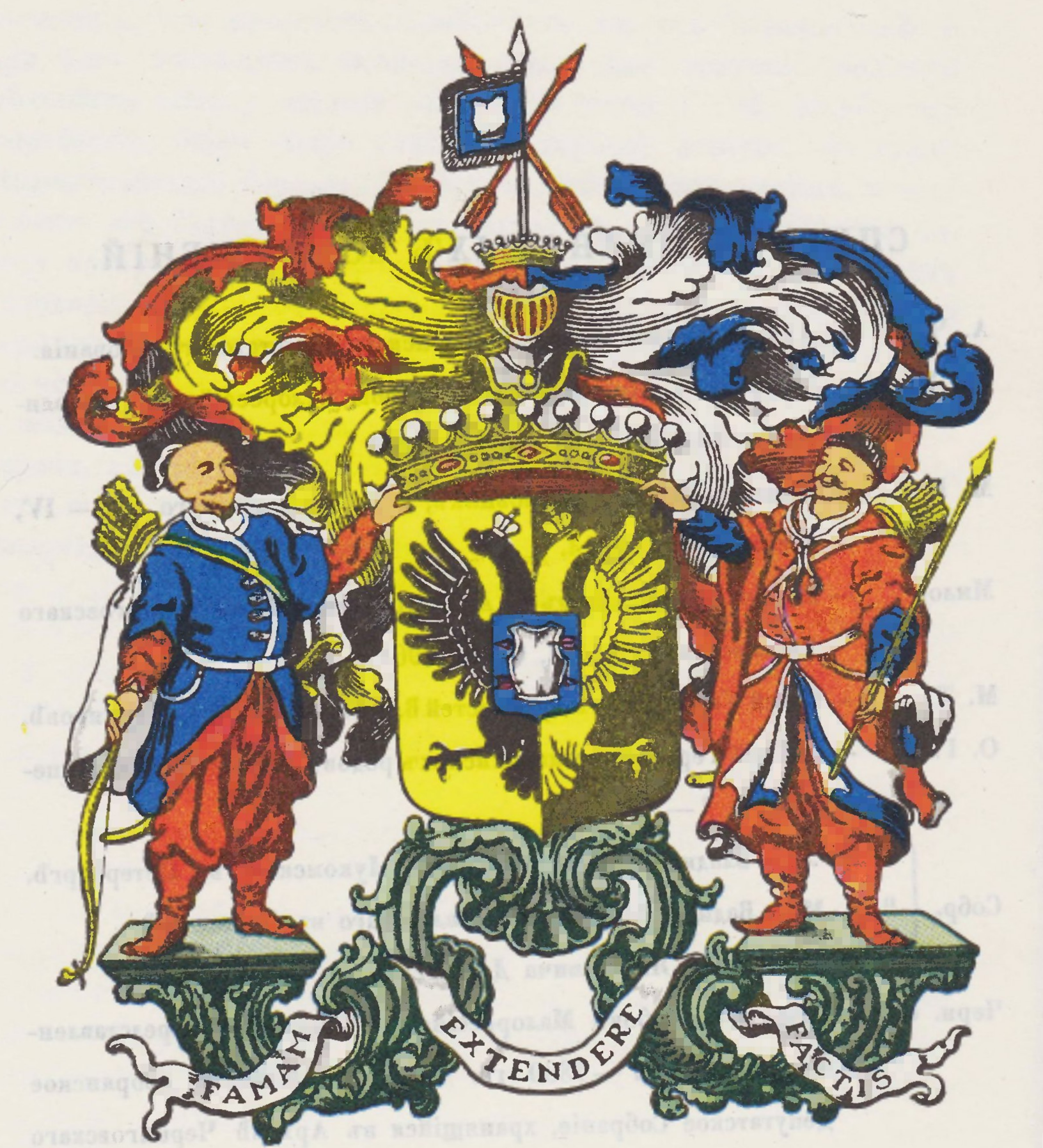
Full achievement of Razumovsky

== Sources ==
- В. К. Лукомскїй, В. Л. Модзалевскїй. Малороссїйский гербовnикъ. — Санкт-Петербургъ: типография С.Н. Тройницкого "Сириус", изданїε Черниговскаго дворѧнства, 1914.
