= BSB cod. icon. 326 =

1594 armorial of the Holy Roman Empire

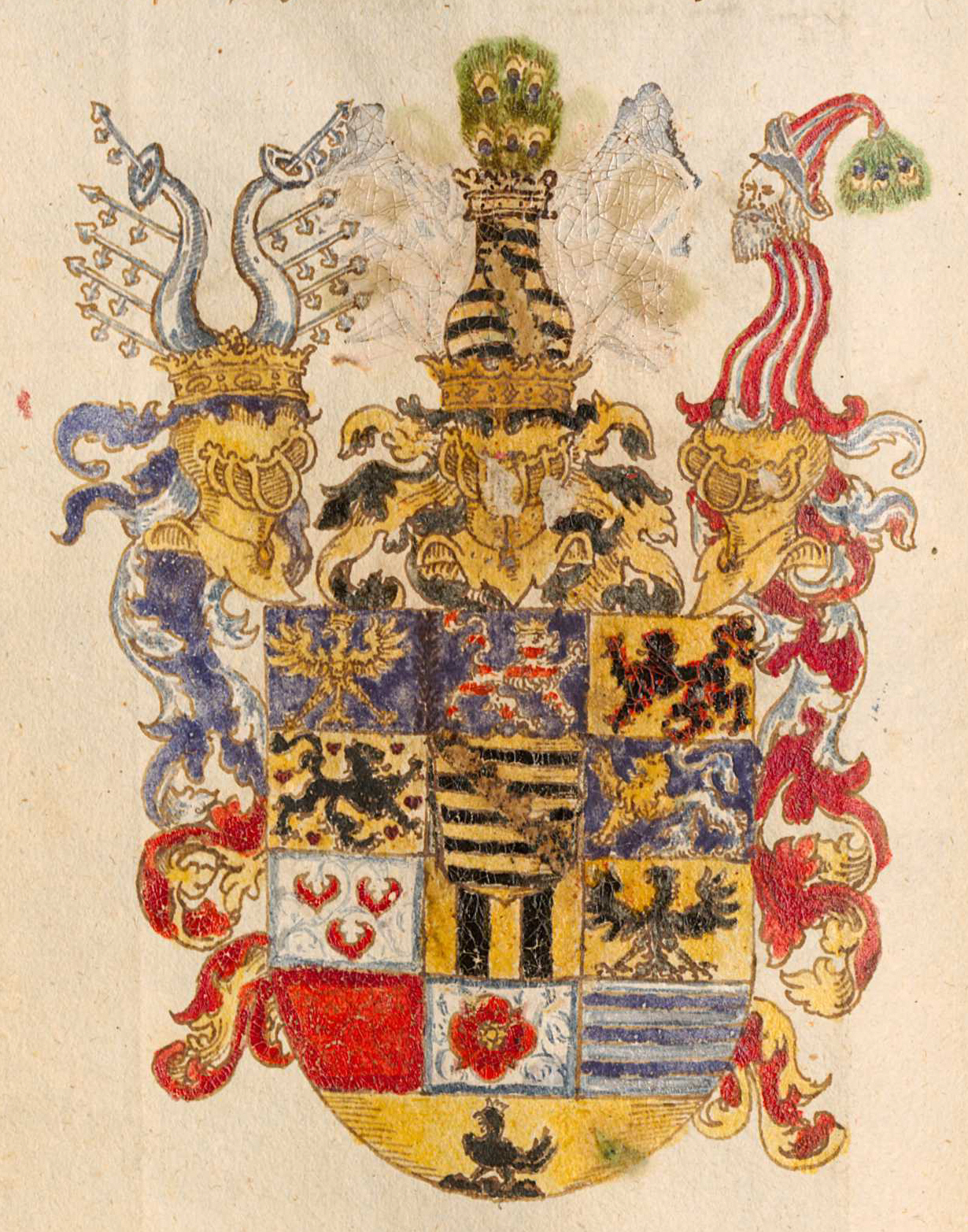
Arms of Friedrich Wilhelm I, Duke of Saxe-Weimar.

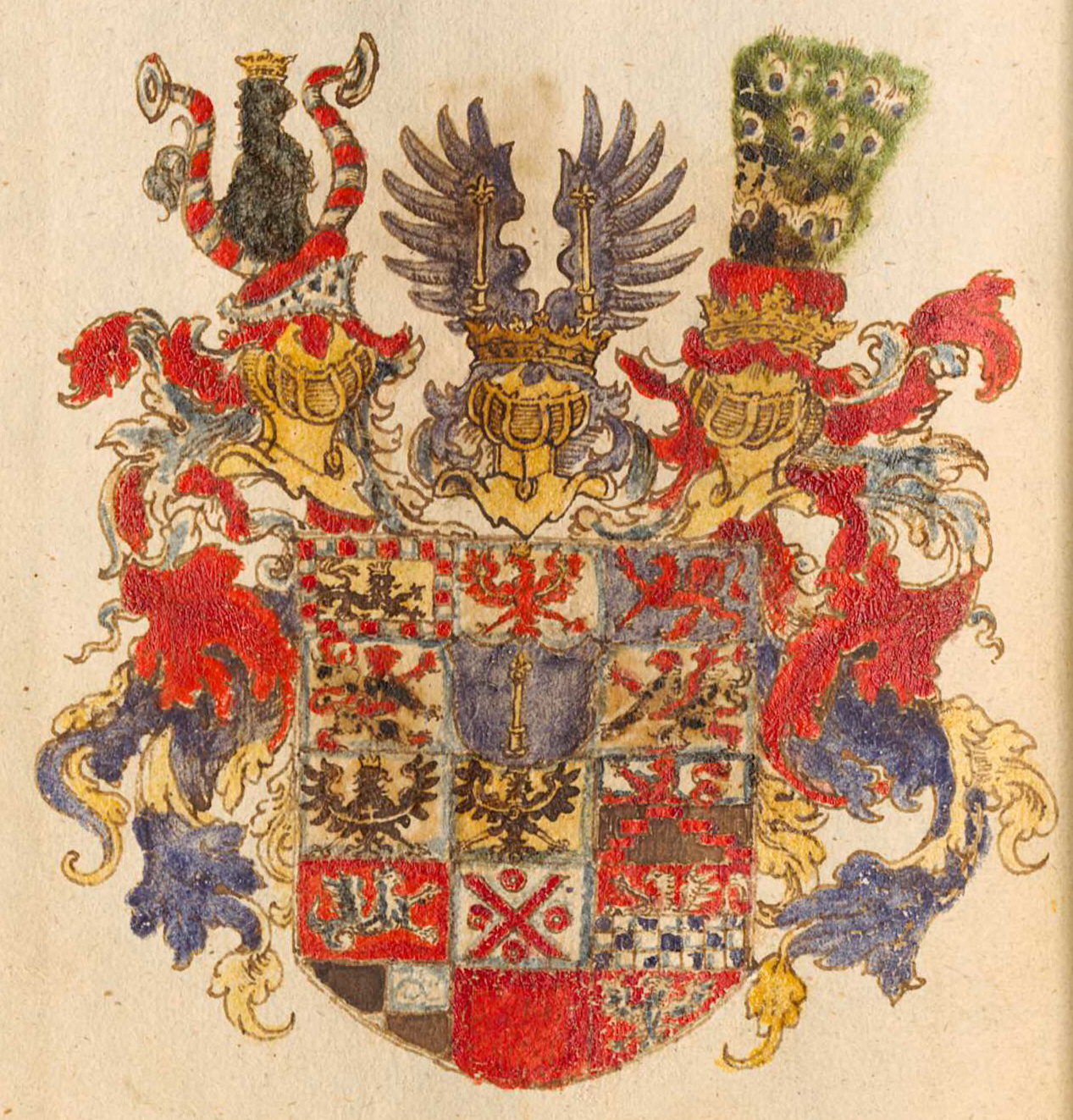
Arms of John George, Elector of Brandenburg

Codex iconographicus monacensis 236 (BSB cod. icon. 326) is an armorial of the coats of arms of the attendants of the imperial diet of 1594 at Regensburg (formerly Regensburg city library, Rat. civ. 252) Rudolf II in 1594 declared Regensburg would be the sole location where imperial diets were to be held in the future.

The codex consists of paper folia measuring 22.5⨯16 cm with 48 non-empty pages. It contains a total of 84 coats of arms, mostly the personal or family arms of princes, with some clerical arms and ten city arms. The coats of arms are arranged by the accommodation of the bearers in Regensburg's eight city districts (Wachten).

- 1r Frederick I, Duke of Württemberg
- 5v Philipe de Croÿ, Duke of Aerschot
- 6r – 12v Ostner Wacht
- 13r – 15v Wildwercher Wacht
- 16r – 21v Wittwanger Wacht
- 22r – 24r Westner Wacht
- 25r – 37r Scherer Wacht
  - 25r Archbishop-Elector of Mainz Wolfgang von Dalberg
- 38r – 44v Quartier in der Pauluser Wacht
  - 42v John Casimir, Duke of Saxe-Coburg
  - 44r Johann Georg, Prince of Hohenzollern-Hechingen
  - 44v Philipp Ludwig II, Count of Hanau-Münzenberg
- 45r – 47v Donauwacht
  - 45r Christian IV of Denmark
  - 47v arms of the city of Nördlingen represented by city councillor Thomas Dithey und advocate Sebastian Rattinger
- 48r Wahlenwacht; arms of the duke of Braunschweig-Lüneburg
