= Gilles Le Bouvier =

French herald, diplomat and writer

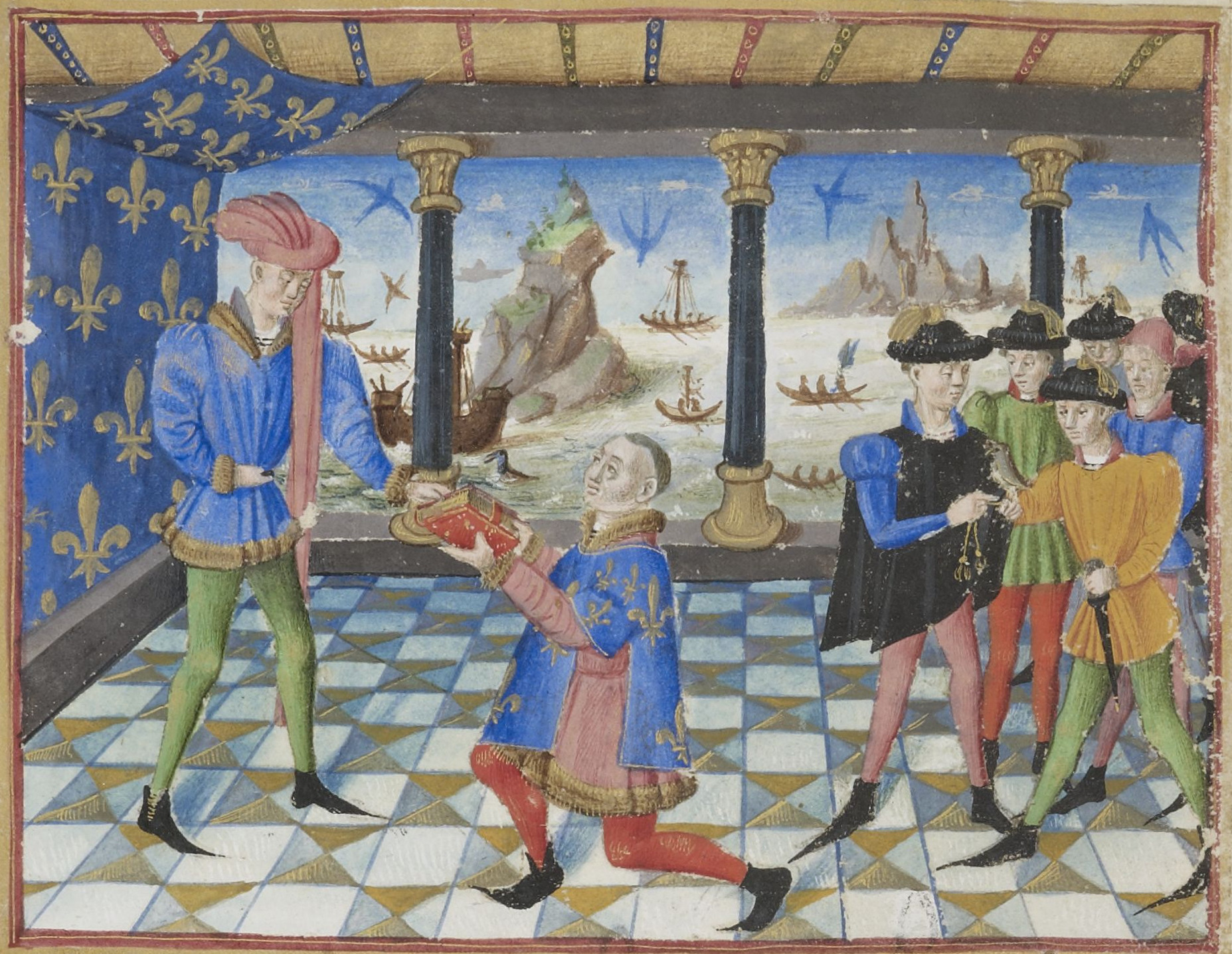
Presentation miniature in the Armorial of Gilles Le Bouvier showing Gilles Le Bouvier kneeling, giving his book to Charles VII of France.

Gilles Le Bouvier (1386–c. 1455) was a French herald, diplomat and writer. He served King Charles VII of France and compiled an official history of the king's reign. Gilles Le Bouvier also wrote a geographical work with descriptions of the lands he had visited as a diplomat for the king, including Armenia and Turkey. He was also the author of a lavishly illustrated armorial preserved in the national library of France (BnF), the Armorial of Gilles Le Bouvier.

== Biography ==
Gilles Le Bouvier was born in Bourges. He came to Paris in 1402 and came into the service of King Charles VII of France. He was made Roi d'armes de Berry or Héraut Berry ("Herald of Berry) in 1420, and in 1451 was promoted to Roi d'armes des Français (Chief Herald of France). From 1438, he travelled extensively throughout Europe on various diplomatic missions for the king. The last five years of his life he dedicated to writing.

== Works ==
In his role as herald to the king, Gilles Le Bouvier was tasked with writing an official history of the reign of Charles VII, Chronique de Charles VII. The original version survives in a single manuscript in the national library of France, BnF. Another 20 manuscript versions have survived of a later, somewhat different edition. The work was furthermore printed in several editions in the 16th and 17th centuries. A modern, critical edition was printed in France in 1979. The chronicle, though avoiding themes and events which may show Charles VII in a poor light, has nonetheless been described as "neutral in tone and very well informed". It is to some extent based on the personal experiences of Le Bouvier, but also builds on archival material and narratives from others.

From the late 1430s, Gilles Le Bouvier travelled on diplomatic missions for the king, both to adjacent lands and to more faraway destinations such as present-day Turkey and Armenia. As a result of his travels, he also wrote Le livre de la description des pays ("The Book of Description of Countries"), which contains information about the countries he visited, though not always his own observations but rather compiled information from various sources. The original manuscript is preserved in the BnF. A printed, critical edition in French was published in 1908. An English translation of excerpts from the book was published in 2024.

Gilles Le Bouvier also compiled an armorial for his personal use, the Armorial of Gilles Le Bouvier. The manuscript is lavishly illustrated by several artists, including Jean Fouquet and the Master of the Vienna Roman de la Rose. It is today preserved in the BnF in Paris.
