= Roll of arms =

Record of coats of arms

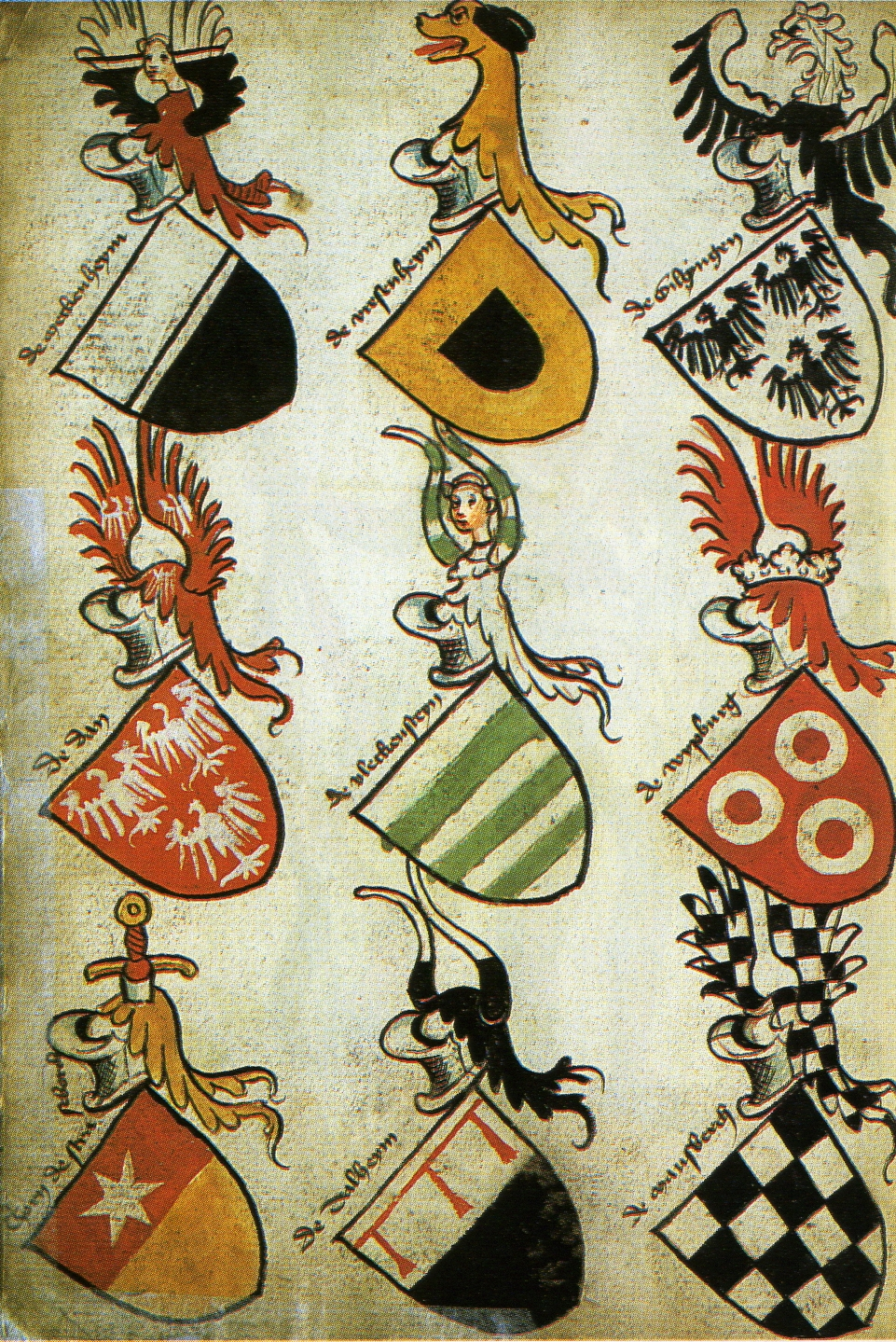
Hyghalmen Roll, German, c. 1485. An example of a late medieval roll of arms. College of Arms, London.

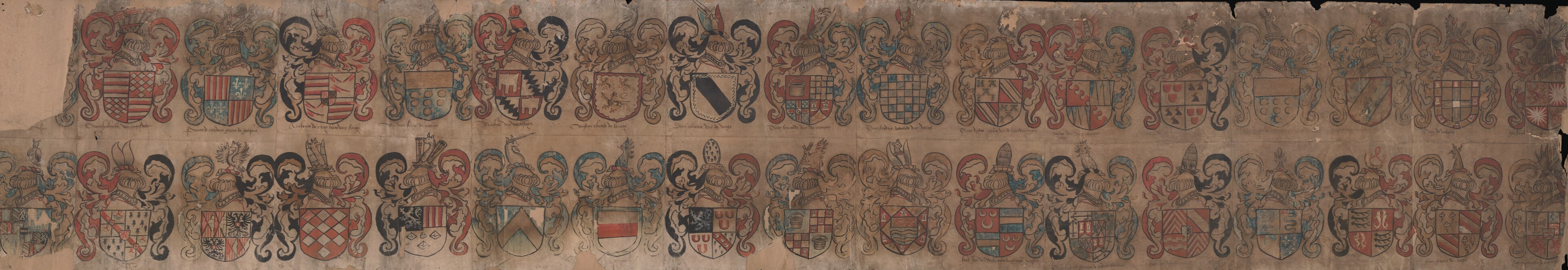
Roll of arms of the knights of the Golden Fleece. Made in the first half of the 16th century.

A roll of arms (or armorial) is a collection of coats of arms, usually consisting of rows of painted pictures of shields, each shield accompanied by the name of the person bearing the arms.

The oldest extant armorials date to the mid-13th century, and armorial manuscripts continued to be produced throughout the early modern period. Siebmachers Wappenbuch of 1605 was an early instance of a printed armorial. Medieval armorials usually include a few hundred coats of arms, in the late medieval period sometimes up to some 2,000. In the early modern period, the larger armorials develop into encyclopedic projects, with the Armorial général de France (1696), commissioned by Louis XIV of France, listing more than 125,000 coats of arms. In the modern period, the tradition develops into projects of heraldic dictionaries edited in multiple volumes, such as the Dictionary of British Arms in four volumes (1926–2009), or J. Siebmacher's großes Wappenbuch in seven volumes (1854–1967).

Armorials can be "occasional", relating to a specific event such as a tournament; "institutional", associated with foundations, such as that of an order of chivalry, "regional", collecting the arms of the nobility of a given region, "illustrative", in the context of a specific narrative or chronicle, or "general", with the aim of an encyclopedic collection. A roll of arms arranged systematically by design, with coats featuring the same principal elements (geometrical ordinaries and charges) grouped together as a tool to aid identification, is known as an ordinary of arms (or simply as an ordinary).

== Notable examples ==
=== Medieval ===
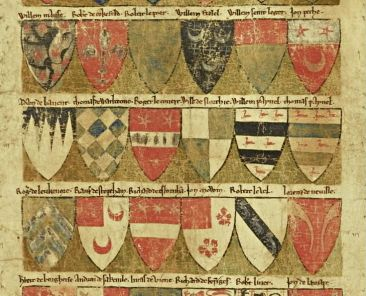
Dering Roll, c. 1270, Dover. Lists knights of Kent & Essex. British Library. Provenance: Sir Edward Dering (1598–1644), Lt. of Dover Castle

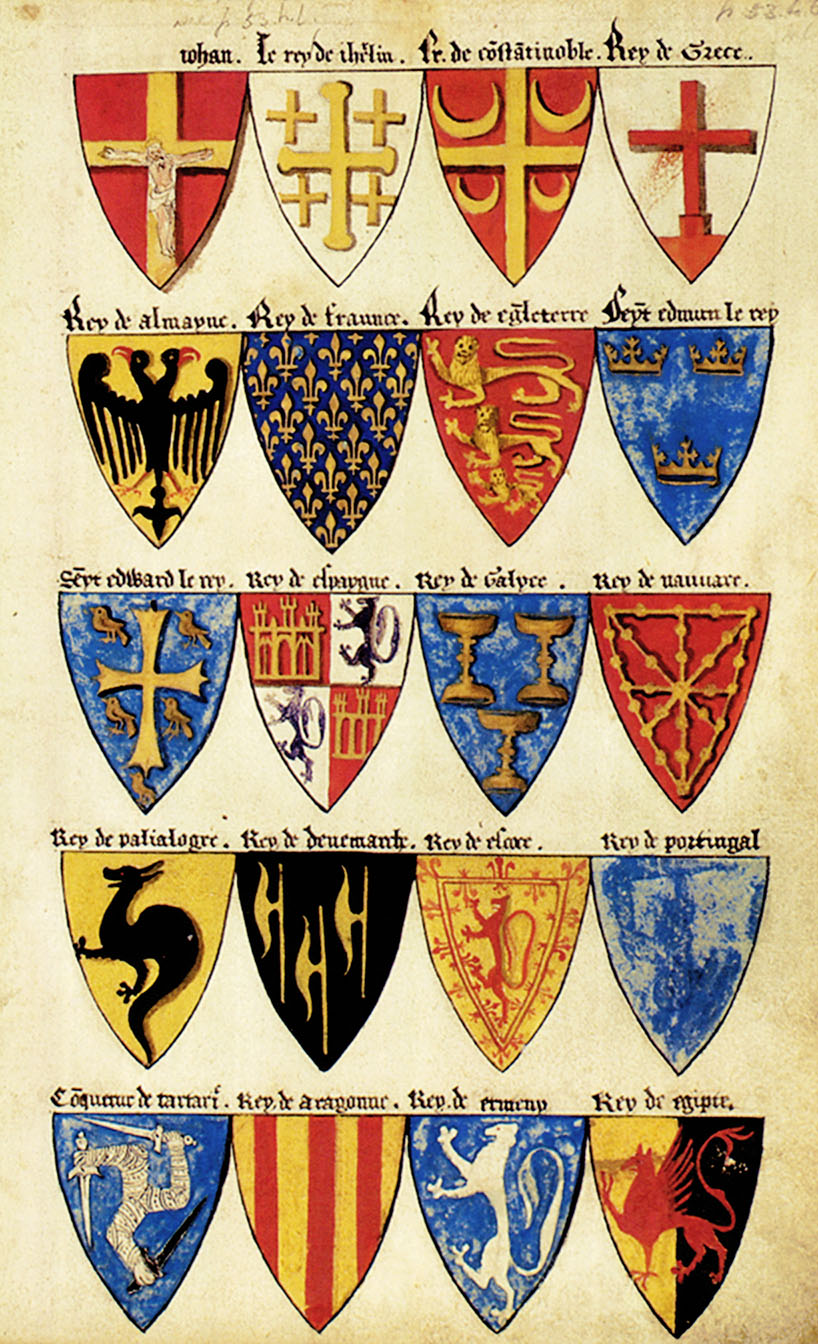
Segar's Roll, a 17th-century copy of a 13th-century roll

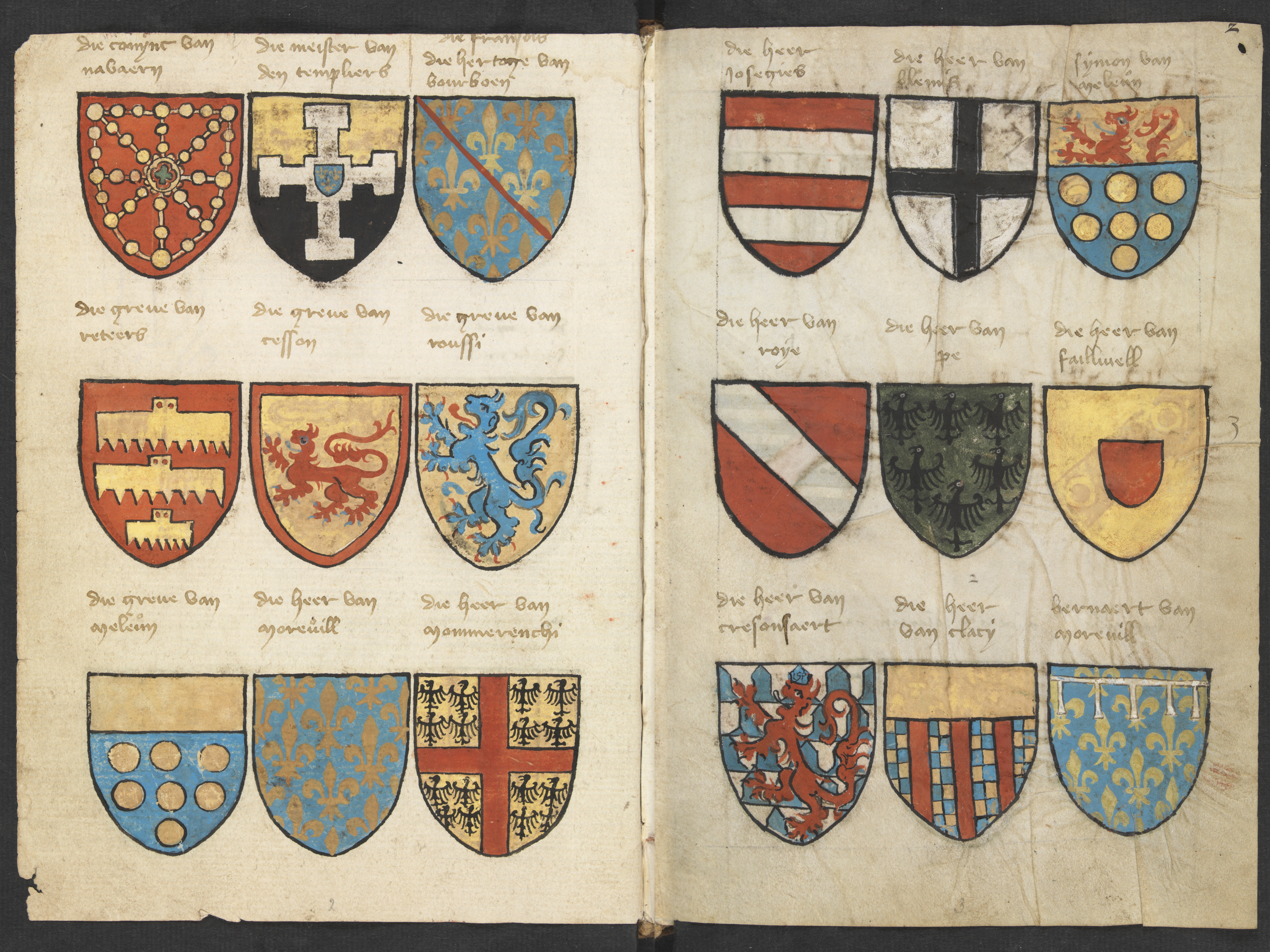
Left folium 001v and right folium 002r from the Beyeren Armorial, 1402–1405

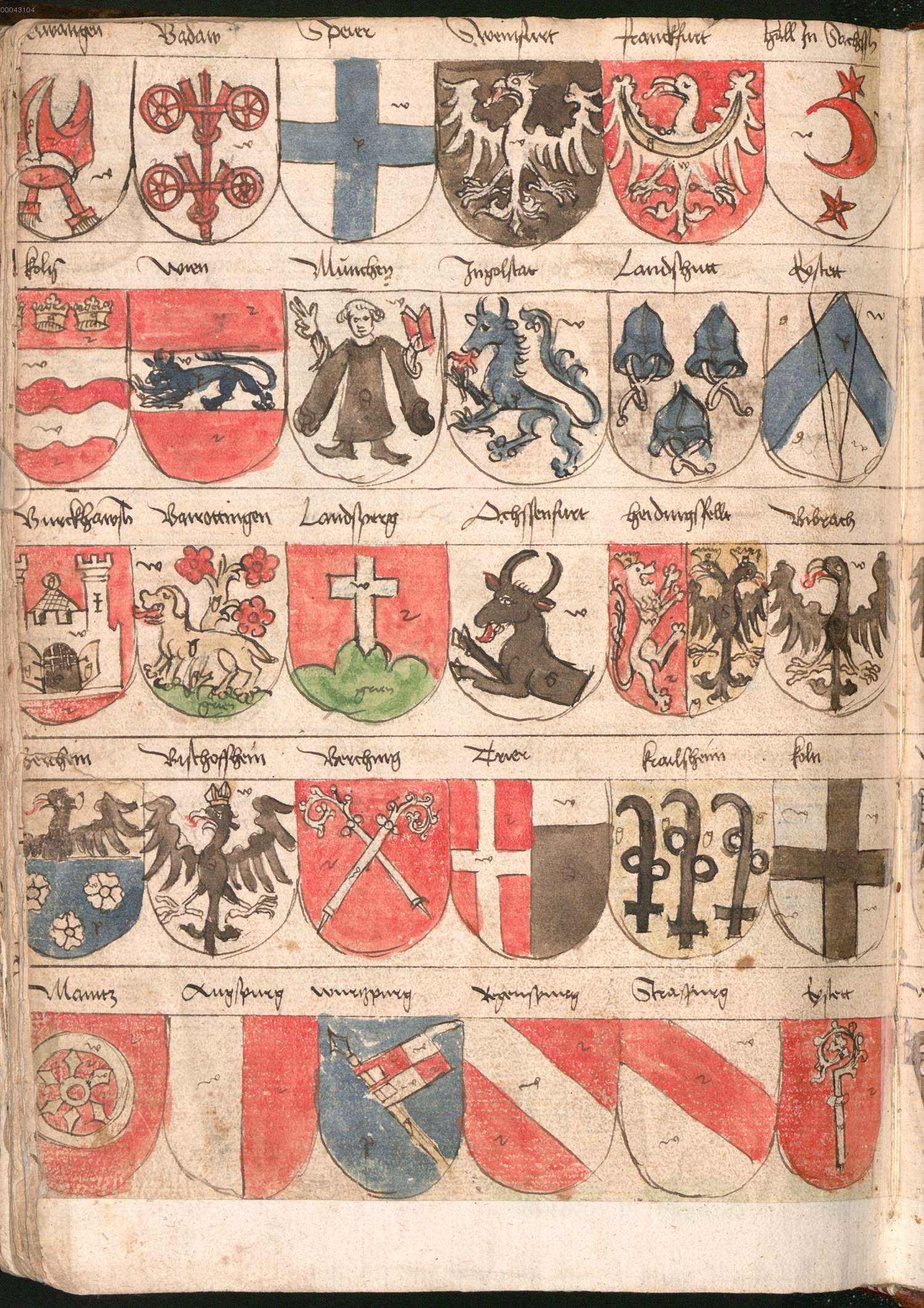
Folio 259v. from Wernigerode Wappenbuch, Bavaria, c. 1486–1492

==== Scottish ====
- Balliol Roll is a Scottish roll of arms from the end of the 13th century and was the earliest roll of arms in Scotland.
- Sir David Lindsay's Armorial is a 16th-century Scottish armorial.

==== English ====
- Glover's Roll is an English roll of arms from the 1240s or 1250s, containing the blazons of 225 coats of arms.
- The Matthew Paris Shields, not truly a roll but a set of marginal illustrations accompanying the chronicler's illuminated manuscript works, Chronica Majora and Historia Anglorum. These date from c. 1244–59, during the reign of Henry III, and contain drawings of shields with Latin annotations.
- Walford's Roll is an English roll dating from c. 1275, containing 185 coats with blazons.
- The Camden Roll is an English roll dating from c. 1280, containing 270 painted coats, 185 with blazons.
- The Dering Roll, dating from the late 13th century, contains 324 coats of arms, painted on parchment. It is 8 1/4 inches (210 mm) wide by 8 feet 8 inches (2.64 m) long. It currently resides in the British Library.
- The Heralds' Roll is an English roll dating from c. 1280, containing 697 painted coats.
- St George's Roll is an English roll dating from c. 1285, containing 677 painted coats.
- Charles' Roll is an English roll dating from c. 1285, containing 486 painted coats. Planché however names as "Charles's Roll" a copy of a mid-13th-century roll [British Library, Harley MS 6589] containing nearly 700 coats drawn in pen and ink (i.e. tricked) by Nicholas Charles (d. 1613), Lancaster Herald, in 1607. Charles stated that the original had been lent to him by the Norroy King of Arms.
- The Lord Marshal's Roll is an English roll dating from 1295, containing 565 painted coats.
- Collins' Roll is a roll dating from 1296, containing 598 painted coats. It currently resides at the College of Arms in London.
- The Falkirk Roll is an English occasional roll dating from c. 1298, containing 115 coats with blazons, listing the knights with King Edward I at Battle of Falkirk in 1298. Various copies exist. The British Library copy was formerly in the Treasury Chamber in Paris in 1576.
- The Galloway Roll is an English roll dating from 1300, containing 259 coats with blazons.
- Roll of Caerlaverock or Poem of Caerlaverock is a roll dating from 1300, containing 110 poetical blazons without images. Two other copies exist, made by Glover from a now-lost different original source, one at the College of Arms in London, the other at the Office of the Ulster King of Arms in Dublin. The original was made in 1300 by English heralds during Edward I's siege of Caerlaverock Castle, Scotland.
- Stirling Roll is an English roll from 1304, containing 102 coats.
- Stepney Roll is an English occasional roll listing the knights present at Stepney Tournament in 1308.
- The Great, Parliamentary, or Banneret's Roll, c. 1312, is an English roll consisting of 19 vellum leaves (measuring 6" x 8.25"), which include the names and blazons of 1,110 nobles, bishops, knights and deceased lords of the day. It is now part of the British Library manuscript collection - Cotton MS Caligula A, XVIII.
- Dunstable Roll is an English occasional roll listing knights present at Dunstable Tournament in 1334.
- Calais Roll is an English roll dating from 1346 to 1347, containing 116 shields in brown ink, tricked to denote tinctures. This roll was probably made in the late 16th century from transcripts of accounts kept by Walter Wetewang, Treasurer of the Household 1346–7, showing wages paid to participants at the Siege of Calais. Extant in the form of about twenty 16th-century manuscripts, this roll was classed as spurious by Wagner (1950), but as "one of the documentary pillars of fourteenth-century military studies" by Ayton (1994).
- Powell's Roll is an English roll dating from c. 1345–1351.
- Salisbury Roll is an English roll in two similar versions: the "Original Roll" dating from c. 1463, in the collection of the Duke of Buccleuch, a descendant of the Montagu family; and the later "Copy A", made c. 1483–5, in the collection of the British Library, catalogued as Add MS 45133. It contains coats of arms of the Montagu family, Earls of Salisbury. "Copy A" was formerly in the collection of Sir Thomas Wriothesley, Garter King of Arms 1505–34 and later was owned by William Smith, Rector of Melsonby (d.1735). Parts are now in the British Library in London.

==== French ====
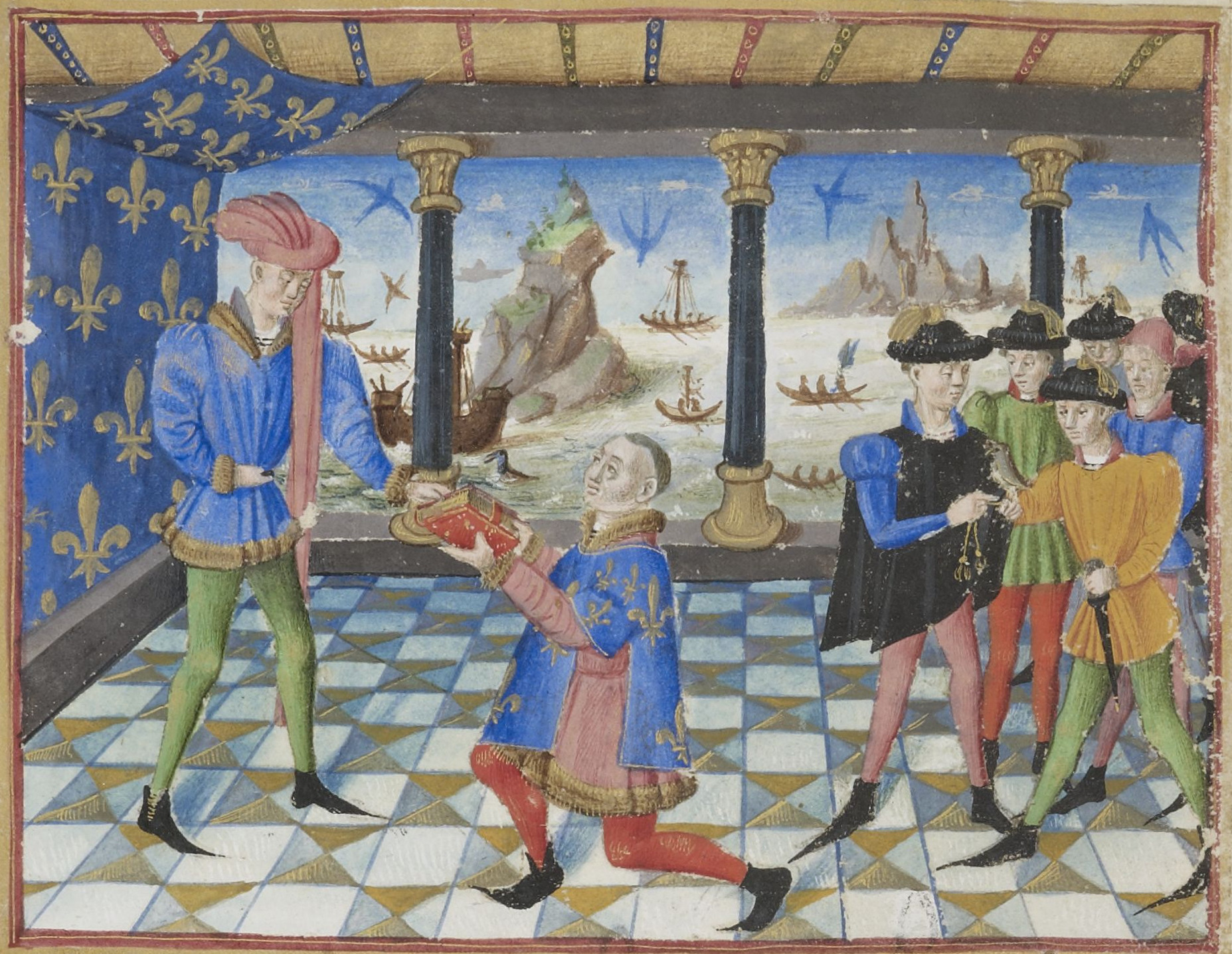
Presentation miniature in the Armorial of Gilles Le Bouvier showing herald Gilles Le Bouvier kneeling, giving his book to Charles VII of France.

- The Bigot Roll is a French roll dating from 1254, containing 300 coats.
- The Armorial Wijnbergen is a French roll published in two parts (Part 1, c. 1265–1270; Part 2, c. 1270–1285), containing 1,312 painted coats. It resided for a while at the Royal Dutch Association of Genealogy & Heraldry, but has been returned; the present owners are not known.
- The Chifflet-Prinet Roll is a French roll dating from c. 1285–1298, containing 147 coats with blazons.
- Armorial du Hérault Vermandois is a French roll of arms dating from c. 1285–1300, containing 1,076 blazons.
- Armorial Le Breton, with 580 coats of arms (230 of which are not identified), c. 1292, with addition of 144 coats of arms in the 15th century, and another 15 added c. 1530.
- The Armorial of Gilles Le Bouvier, made for the personal use of the Chief Herald of France Gilles Le Bouvier (1386–c. 1455).
- Armorial Bellenville by Claes Heinen (1386), 1,738 coats of arms
- Grand Armorial équestre de la Toison d'or, an armorial of the members of the Order of the Golden Fleece between 1429 and 1461, commissioned by a herald in the Duchy of Burgundy.

==== Holy Roman Empire ====
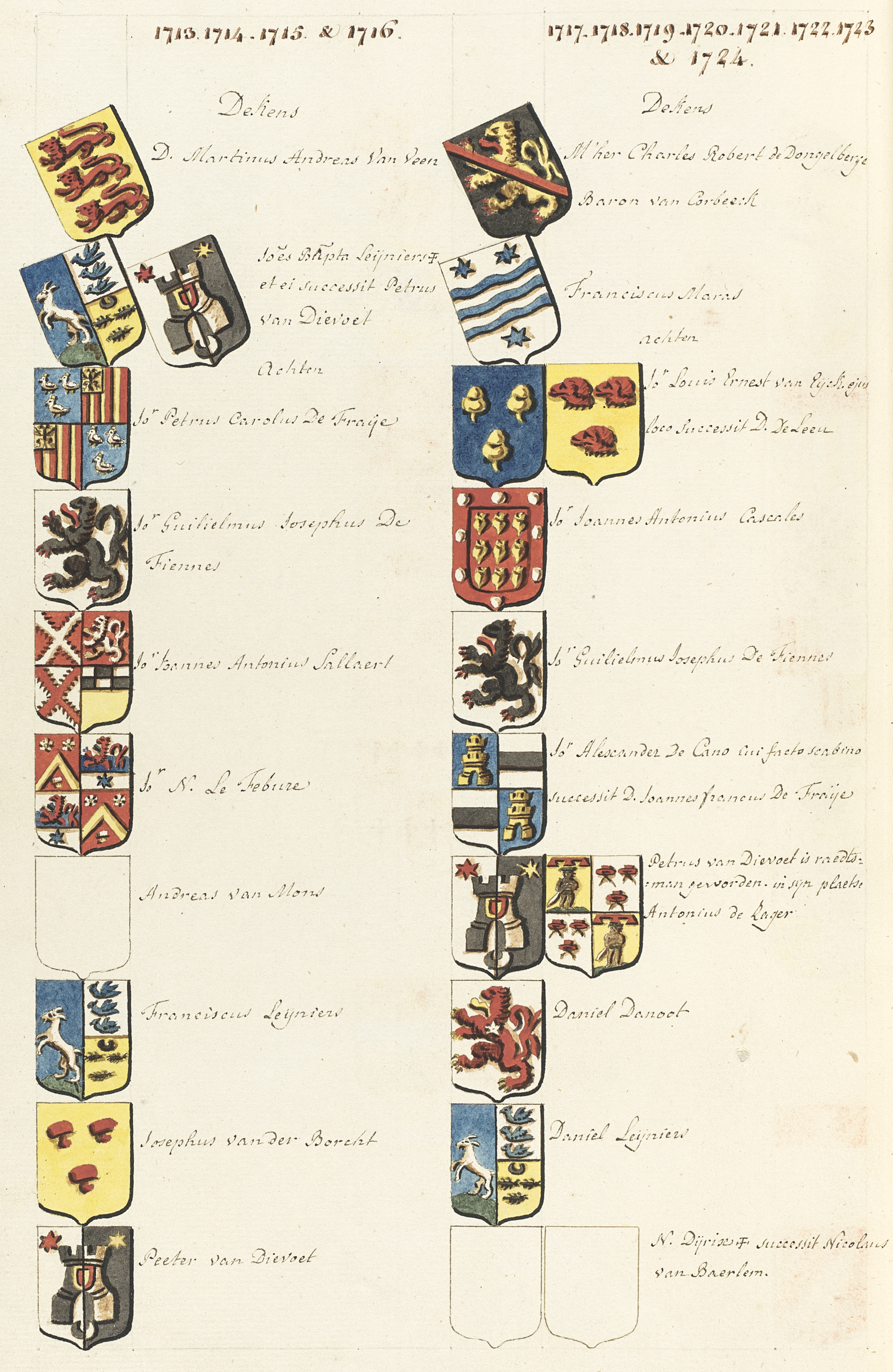
Roll of arms of the Drapery Court of Brussels. (1713–1724)

- The oldest collections of coats of arms are preserved not in manuscript form, but in the form of heraldic friezes, painted on walls or wooden beams, derived from the earlier practice of hanging guest's heraldic shields on walls on festive occasions. Among the oldest such friezes preserved is the one at Valère Basilica, Valais, dated 1224.
- The oldest collection of blazons, Latin descriptions of coats of arms, of the Holy Roman Empire is Clipearius Teutonicorum by Conrad of Mure, dated 1260–64.
- Turino armorial (1312), descriptions of 119 coats of arms of the attendants of the coronation of Henry VII.
- The coats of arms shown with the singer portraits in Codex Manesse (although not technically an armorial) are an important source for early 14th-century heraldry.
- The Zürich armorial made in c. 1340 presumably in what is now eastern Switzerland (in or nearby of what is now the canton of St Gallen), now in the Swiss National Museum in Zürich.
- Gelre Armorial is a Dutch roll of arms dating from c. 1370–1414, containing about 1,700 coats of arms. It currently resides at the Royal Library of Belgium. It was compiled by Claes Heinenzoon.
- The Beyeren Armorial is a medieval Dutch manuscript containing 1096 coats of arms, completed between 1402 and 1405, annotated in Middle Dutch. It is currently held by the National Library of the Netherlands. It was compiled by Claes Heinenzoon, who also compiled the Gelre Armorial.
- Wappenbüchlein E.E. Zunft zu Pfisten in Luzern (1408), 5 foll. with 59 Lucerne guild coats of arms.
- Hyghalmen Roll is a German roll of arms made around 1447–1455 in Cologne. It currently resides at the College of Arms in London.
- Hans Ingeram's armorial (1459), 280 pages with c. 1,100 coats of arms.
- Wappenbuch der österreichischen Herzöge, c. 1445–1457, 50 foll. with some 170 coats of arms.
- Wernigerode Armorial is a Bavarian roll of arms from around 1486–1492, containing 524 pages, 477 of which are illustrated with anywhere from one to thirty coats of arms (most of these have four coats of arms each).
- Stemmario Trivulziano is a Milanese roll of the second half of the 15th century, containing approximately 2,000 coats. It currently resides at Biblioteca Trivulziana, Milan, Italy. Attributed to Gian Antonio da Tradate, it was in the possession of Gian Giacomo Trivulzio, who served as a Milanese condottiero between 1465 and 1483. It blazons the ducal arms and those of linked families such as Brandolini, Savelli, Colonna, Orsini, Scaligeri, Este and Gonzaga. Also included are the arms of the German merchant-bankers Fugger.
- Scheiblersches Wappenbuch, c. 1450–1480, 624 coats of arms.
- Armorial of Conrad Grünenberg, Constance (1483), some 2,000 coats of arms.
- St. Gallen armorial, 1466–1470, 338 pages with some 200 coats of arms
- Eichstätt armorial, 1474–1478, 351 pages with some 2,000 coats of arms
- Palatine armorial, c. 1460, 200 foll. with 1,080 coats of arms.
- Heroldsbuch des Jülicher Hubertus-Ordens (1480), 130 foll. with some 1,000 coats of arms
- Leipzig armorial, c. 1450s, 96 foll. with 602 coats of arms
- Miltenberg armorial, late 15th century, 85 foll. with c. 1,700 coats of arms.
- Berlin armorial, c. 1470, 254 pages with c. 900 coats of arms
- Innsbruck armorial, c. 1460s, 157 foll. with 408 coats of arms.
- Gerold Edlibach's armorial of Zürich, 1490s.

==== Spanish ====
- The Book of Knowledge of All Kingdoms (Libro del Conosçimiento de todos los rregnos) of c. 1385 goes beyond the scope of a mere armorial, being a fictional travelogue, giving an account of the geography of the known world, identifying all lands, kings, lords and their armorial devices. The book's main purpose is still that of an armorial, but fashioned in the genre of the travelogue popularized by Marco Polo and John Mandeville.
- Armorial de la Cofradia di Santiago (Book of the Knights of the Brotherhood of Santiago), continuously updated from the order's foundation in 1338 into the 17th century.

=== Early Modern ===
- Livro do Armeiro-Mor is a Portuguese official roll from 1509, compiled by João do Cró, Portugal King of Arms. It includes almost 400 real and imaginary coats of arms, including those of the Nine Worthies, of the states of Europe, Africa and Asia, of the electors of the Holy Roman Emperor, of the pairs of France, of members of the Portuguese royal family and of the other noble families of Portugal.
- Livro da Nobreza a Perfeiçam das Armas is a Portuguese official roll from c. 1521–1541, compiled by António Godinho, secretary of the King John III of Portugal. It follows the model of the Livro do Armeiro-Mor, being its update, but omitting the chapters on the Nine Worthies, the electors of the Emperor and the pairs of France.
- Virgil Solis' Wappenbüchlein (1555), coats of arms of the nobility of the Holy Roman Empire.
- Fojnica Armorial is an early modern (16th or 17th century) Balkan roll of arms, containing 139 coats of arms.
- Korenić-Neorić Armorial (1595 copy of the slightly older, c. 1590, Ohmućević Armorial), an "Illyrianist" armorial of the Balkans; the Belgrade Armorial II is an early 17th-century copy.
- Siebmachers Wappenbuch is a general roll of arms of the Holy Roman Empire, compiled by Johann Siebmacher around 1605.
- Thesouro da Nobreza is a general Portuguese roll, compiled by Francisco Coelho, India King of Arms, in 1675. It includes the real and imaginary arms of the 12 tribes of Israel, of the Nine Worthies, of the Romans, of the pairs of France, of the electors of the Empire, of the cavalry and regular orders of Portugal, of some cities of the overseas dominions of Portugal, of the cities and principal towns of Portugal, of the Kings and Queens of Portugal, of the dukes and marquises of Portugal, of the counts of Portugal and of the families.
- Armorial général de France, commissioned by Louis XIV of France, by Charles René d'Hozier (1696), with 125,807 coats of arms.
- Tractat d'Armoria (16 to 17th century, unfinished), by Jaume Ramon Vila, priest and presbyter of the cathedral of Barcelona, and heraldist. Four books with catalan coats of arms, but also historical digressions, for example related to the discovery of America, with some information that differs from the current historical corpus.
- Stemmatografia is a book containing various coats of arms from Illyria, with their descriptions in verse, made by Pavao Ritter Vitezović, 1701
- The Gore Roll by Boston coach painter John Gore is the earliest known American armorial, 1750s

=== Modern ===
- Burke's General Armory: "The General Armory of England, Scotland, Ireland and Wales; Comprising a Registry of Armorial Bearings from the Earliest to the Present Time," by Sir Bernard Burke, Ulster King of Arms was published in London in 1884. This roll comprises a listing of all known armory ever used in the British Isles.
- J. Siebmacher's großes Wappenbuch (continuation of the early modern Siebmachers Wappenbuch), edd. Otto Titan v. Hefner, Heyer v. Rosenfeld, A. M. Hildebrandt, G. A. Seyler, M. Gritzner et al., 7 volumes (1854–1967); vol. 1: National coats of arms and national flags, episcopal arms, occupational coats of arms, university arms; vols. 2–3: nobility of Germany and Prussia; vol. 4: nobility of Austria-Hungary; vol. 5: bourgeois familial coats of arms (Germany and Switzerland); vol. 6: extinct nobility of the Holy Roman Empire; vol. 7: supplemental volume.
- Armorial Général by Jean-Baptiste Rietstap, two volumes (1884, 1887), more than 100,000 coats of arms with pan-European scope.
- Roll of Arms by the Committee on Heraldry of the New England Historic Genealogical Society (1914)
- Armorial of Little Russia (Малороссїйскїй гербовникъ, 1914): Ukrainian (Little Russian) family coats of arms within the Russian Empire.
- Georges Dansaert, Nouvel armorial belge, ancien et moderne, précédé de l'art héraldique et ses diverses applications, Brussels : Éditions J. Moorthamers, 1949.
- International Register of Arms, formerly Burke's Peerage & Gentry International Register of Arms, an international roll of arms on the internet and published in book form periodically (3 volumes so far).
- Armorial héraldique vivante, in: Le Parchemin, Genealogical and Heraldic Office of Belgium, 2003.
- Jean-Paul Springael, Armoiries de personnes physiques et d'association familiale en communauté française, edited by the direction of the Patrimoine culturel
- Carnet Mondain
- État présent de la noblesse belge [fr; nl]
- Public Register of Arms, Flags and Badges of Canada: A digital armorial of the arms, flags, banners, and other heraldic devices granted by the Canadian Heraldic Authority

== Sources ==
- Ayton, Andrew (1994). "The English Army and the Normandy Campaign of 1346". In Bates, David; Curry, Anne (eds.). England and Normandy in the Middle Ages. London: Hambledon Press. pp. 253–268.
- Clemmensen, S. (2006). Ordinary of Medieval Armorials. Societas Heraldica Scandinavica.
- Clemmensen, S. (2006). "Imaginary arms–traditions in medieval armorials". Proceedings of 27th Congress of Genealogical and Heraldric Sciences. Genealogica & Heraldica. Vol. 1. St. Andrews. pp. 229–239.
- Planché, J.R. (1873) [1852]. The Pursuivant of Arms; or Heraldry founded upon facts. London. pp. 103–104 – via HathiTrust.
- Papworth, J. W. (1874). An Alphabetical Dictionary of Coats of Arms... Forming an Extensive Ordinary of British Armorials... London: T. Richards – via Internet Archive.
  - Reprinted as Papworth, J. W. (1961) [1874]. Ordinary of British Armorials (Reprinted ed.). Tabard Publications.
- Siebmacher, Johann; Horst, Appuhn (1999). Johann Siebmachers Wappenbuch von 1605 (Johann Siebmachers Wappenbuch 1605 ed.). München: Orbis. pp. 191–192. ISBN 3-572-10050-X.
- Wagner, Anthony Richard (1950). A Catalogue of English Medieval Rolls of Arms. Aspilogia. Vol. 1. Oxford: Society of Antiquaries. ISBN 9780854312122.
- Wagner, Anthony Richard (1957). Rolls of Arms: Henry III. Aspilogia. Vol. 2. Oxford: Society of Antiquaries.
- Walford, Weston Styleman; Perceval, Charles Spencer (1864). Three rolls of arms of the latter part of the thirteenth century, together with an index of names and an alphabetical ordinary of the coats. London: J. B. Nichols – via Internet Archive.
- Nicolas, Nicholas Harris (1828). The siege of Carlaverock in the XXVIII Edward I. A.D. MCCC; with the arms of the earls, barons, and knights, who were present on the occasion; with a translation, a history of the castle, and memoirs of the personages commemorated by the poet. London: J.B. Nichols – via Internet Archive.
