= RAF Force Protection Force =

RAF protection force

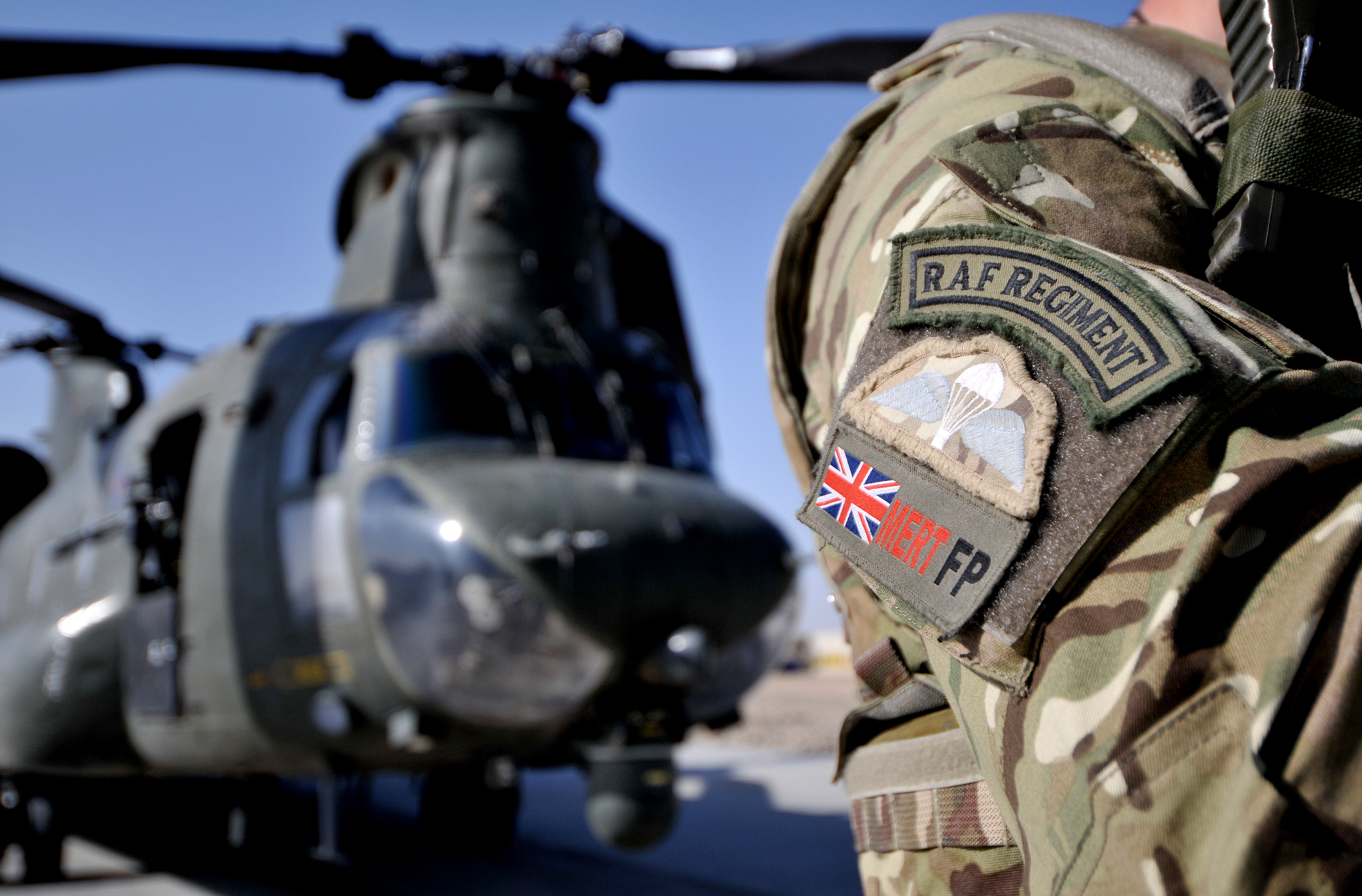
- RAF Regiment Gunner with MERT Chinook in Afghanistan. The gunner wears an FP (Force Protection) identifier.
- Active: 2004–2022
- Country: United Kingdom
- Branch: Royal Air Force
- Role: Force Protection
- Garrison/HQ: RAF Honington

Commanders
- Air Officer Force Protection: Air Commodore Jamie Thompson (final)

The RAF Force Protection Force was created in 2004 as the successor to the Tactical Survive to Operate Headquarters (Tac STO HQ). It consisted of Force Protection Wings which were tasked with protection of RAF stations in the UK and overseas. Each Wing was based around RAF Regiment and RAF Police squadrons, with supporting personnel.

The Force Protection Force was disbanded in November 2022 and replaced by the separate Combat Readiness Force and Air Security Force, both part of Global Enablement, which itself was created by combining the RAF Force Protection Force, Battlespace Management Operations and Support Forces.

== Structure ==
In 2018, there were seven Force Protection wings.

=== No. 2 (C-UAS) Wing ===
RAF Leeming

- No. 2 (C-UAS) Wing Headquarters
- No. 63 Squadron RAF Regiment
- No. 34 Squadron RAF Regiment
- No. 609 (West Riding) Squadron RAuxAF

=== No. 3 Force Protection Wing RAF ===
Its motto is Parare Et Protegrere ("Prepare & Protect").

RAF Marham

- No. 3 RAF Force Protection Wing Headquarters
- No. 2620 (County of Norfolk) Squadron RAuxAF Regiment
- No. 6 RAF Police Squadron
- No. 15 Squadron RAF Regiment

=== No. 4 Force Protection Wing RAF ===
RAF Brize Norton

- No. 4 RAF Force Protection Wing Headquarters
- No. 2 Squadron RAF Regiment
- No. 2624 (County of Oxfordshire) Squadron RAuxAF Regiment
- No. 7 RAF Police Squadron

=== No. 5 Force Protection Wing RAF ===
RAF Lossiemouth

- No. 5 Force Protection Wing Headquarters
- No. 51 Squadron RAF Regiment
- No. 603 (City of Edinburgh) Squadron RAuxAF
- No. 2622 (Highland) Squadron RAuxAF Regiment
- No. 4 RAF Police Squadron

=== No. 7 Force Protection Wing RAF ===
RAF Coningsby

- No. 7 Force Protection Wing Headquarters
- Air Land Integration Cell

RAF Honington

- No. 1 Squadron RAF Regiment

RAF Honington

- No. 2623 (East Anglian) Squadron RAuxAF Regiment

=== No. 8 Force Protection Wing RAF ===
RAF Waddington

- No. 8 Force Protection Wing Headquarters
- No. 2503 (County of Lincoln) Squadron RAuxAF Regiment
- No. 5 RAF Police Squadron

== See also ==
- Airfield Defence Guards (Australia)
- RNZAF Force Protection (New Zealand)
