= Operation Granby order of battle =

This is the order of battle for Operation Granby, the name given to the British Armed Forces deployment to the Middle East after the Iraqi invasion of Kuwait on 2 August 1990 and subsequent operations during the 1991 Gulf War.

British Forces Middle East (BFME) – Lieutenant-General Sir Peter de la Billière

- 1st Armoured Division – Major General Rupert Smith
- Force Maintenance Area (FMA) – Brigadier Martin White
- BFME direct reporting units

== British Army ==
- 1st Armoured Division
  - 1 Armoured Division Signal Regiment
  - 7th Armoured Brigade
    - 7th Armoured Brigade HQ and Signal Squadron (207)
    - Royal Scots Dragoon Guards (Carabiniers and Greys)
    - Queen's Royal Irish Hussars
    - A Squadron, 1st The Queen's Dragoon Guards
    - 1st Battalion, The Staffordshire Regiment (Prince of Wales's)
    - 40 Field Regiment, Royal Artillery
    - 21 Engineer Regiment, Royal Engineers
  - 4th Armoured Brigade
    - 4th Armoured Brigade HQ and Signal Squadron (204)
    - 14th/20th King's Hussars
    - 1st Battalion, The Royal Scots (The Royal Regiment)
    - 3rd Battalion, Royal Regiment of Fusiliers
    - 2nd Field Regiment, Royal Artillery
    - 23 Engineer Regiment, Royal Engineers
  - Divisional Troops
    - 16th/5th The Queen's Royal Lancers
    - 4 Regiment Army Air Corps
    - 26 Field Regiment, Royal Artillery
    - 32 Heavy Regiment, Royal Artillery
    - 39 Heavy Regiment, Royal Artillery
    - 12 Air Defence Regiment, Royal Artillery
    - 32 Armoured Engineer Regiment, Royal Engineers
    - 39 Engineer Regiment, Royal Engineers
    - 15 Field Support Squadron Royal Engineers

Supporting units

- 1 Royal Electrical and Mechanical Engineers
- 1 Armoured Division Signal Regiment
- 30 Signal Regiment
- 14 Signal Regiment (Electronic Warfare)
- 1st Battalion Scots Guards
- 1st Battalion Coldstream Guards
- 1st Battalion Royal Highland Fusiliers
- 1st Battalion King's Own Scottish Borderers
- Elements of 1st Battalion Queen's Own Highlanders
- 1 Armoured Division Transport Regiment Royal Corps of Transport
- 4 Armoured Division Transport Regiment Royal Corps of Transport
- 7 Tank Transporter Regiment Royal Corps of Transport
- 10 Regiment Royal Corps of Transport
- 27 Regiment Royal Corps of Transport
- 28 Ambulance Squadron Gurkha Transport Regiment
- 52 Port Squadron Royal Corps of Transport
- 1 Armoured Field Ambulance
- 5 Armoured Field Ambulance
- 22 Field Hospital
- 23 Parachute Field Ambulance
- 24 Airmobile Field Ambulance
- 32 Field Hospital
- 33 General Hospital
- 60 Field Psychiatric Team
- 205 General Hospital
- 3 Ordnance Battalion Royal Army Ordnance Corps
- 6 Ordnance Battalion RAOC
- 6 Armoured Workshop Royal Electrical and Mechanical Engineers
- 7 Armoured Workshop Royal Electrical and Mechanical Engineers
- 11 Armoured Workshop Royal Electrical and Mechanical Engineers
- 71 Aircraft Workshop Royal Electrical and Mechanical Engineers
- 174 Provost Company Royal Military Police
- 203 Provost Company Royal Military Police
- 27 Group Royal Pioneer Corps
- 187 Company Royal Pioneer Corps
- 221 EOD Coy RAOC
- 598 Company Royal Pioneer Corps
- 54 Squadron Engineer Support and Ambulance Squadron Royal Corps of Transport
- Elements of the Royal Army Pay Corps

== Royal Air Force ==
18 Panavia Tornado F.3s

- No. 5 Squadron RAF
- No. 11 Squadron RAF
- No. 23 Squadron RAF
- No. 25 Squadron RAF
- No. 29 Squadron RAF
- No. 43 Squadron RAF

Panavia Tornado GR.1

- No. 9 Squadron RAF
- No. 14 Squadron RAF
- No. 15 Squadron RAF
- No. 16 Squadron RAF
- No. 17 Squadron RAF
- No. 20 Squadron RAF
- No. 27 Squadron RAF
- No. 31 Squadron RAF
- No. 617 Squadron RAF

Panavia Tornado GR.1a

- No. 2 Squadron RAF
- No. 13 Squadron RAF

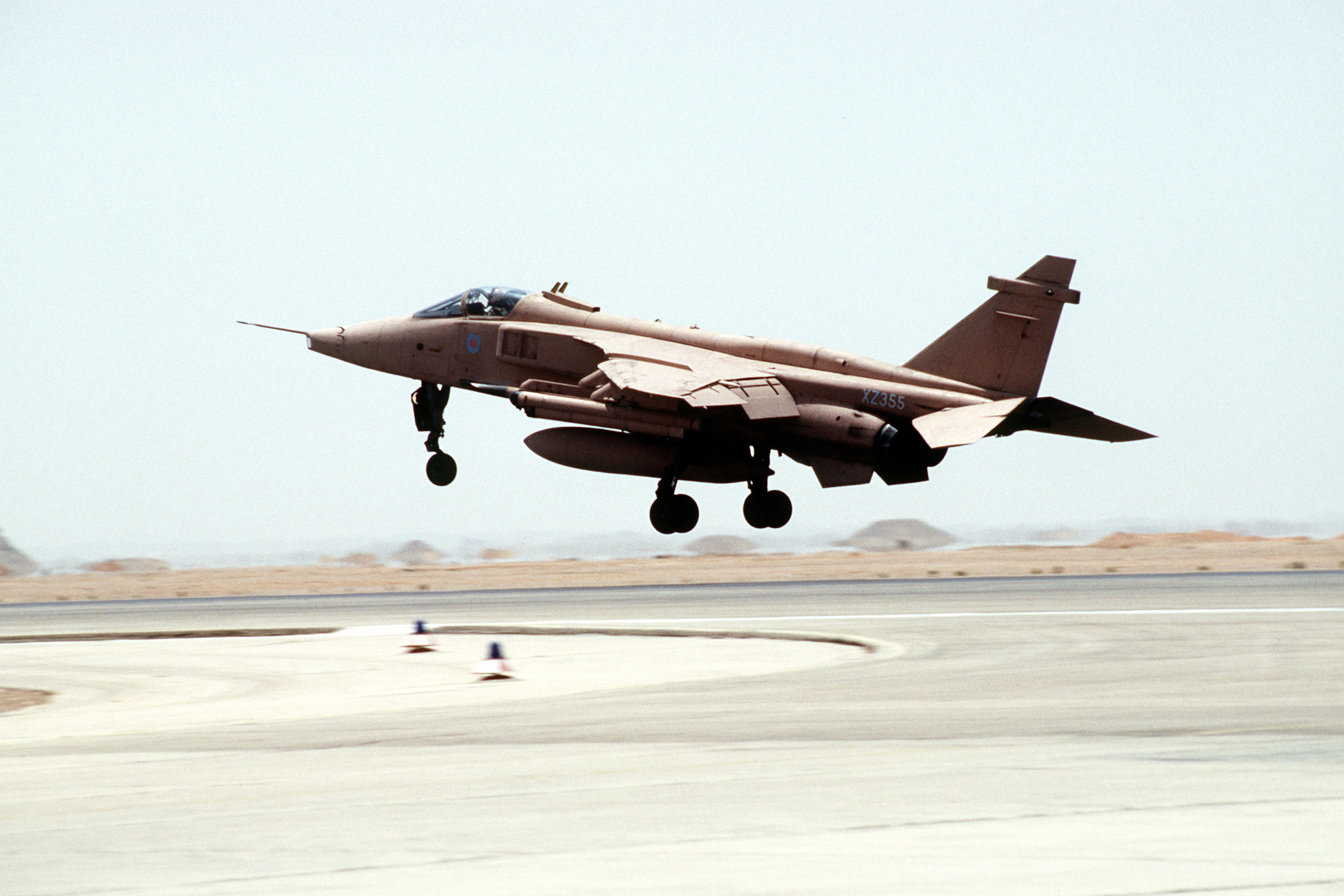
SEPECAT Jaguar GR.1

12 SEPECAT Jaguar GR.1s

- No. 6 Squadron RAF
- No. 41 Squadron RAF
- No. 54 Squadron RAF

Blackburn Buccaneer

- No. 12 Squadron RAF
- No. 208 Squadron RAF

Hawker Siddeley Nimrod

- No. 42 Squadron RAF
- No. 120 Squadron RAF
- No. 201 Squadron RAF
- No. 206 Squadron RAF

Lockheed C-130 Hercules

- No. 24 Squadron RAF
- No. 30 Squadron RAF
- No. 47 Squadron RAF
- No. 70 Squadron RAF

Handley Page Victor

- No. 55 Squadron RAF

Lockheed TriStar K.1

- No. 216 Squadron RAF

Boeing Chinook

- No. 7 Squadron RAF
- No. 18 Squadron RAF

Westland Puma HC.1

- No. 33 Squadron RAF
- No. 230 Squadron RAF

=== RAF Regiment ===
- 4001 Flight RAF Regiment

Members of 4001 Flt RAF Regiment became NBC team attached to the 4th Armoured Division during Desert Shield/Desert Storm and Desert Sabre.

- No. 1 Squadron RAF Regiment

1 Squadron RAF Regiment were flown into Al Qaysumah to reinforce the base from RAF Germany. Equipped with Scorpion and Spartan armoured vehicles, they reinforced Muharraq and crossed into Iraq with 1 (BR) Armoured Division as the reconnaissance screen for the Division, ending the war astride the Kuwait-Basra highway.

- No. 20 Squadron RAF Regiment

20 Squadron RAF Regiment deployed to Cyprus August 1990. One flight deployed to Muharraq late August 1990, second flight joined first in the middle of October 1990, relieved by 66 Squadron in November 1990, and returned to UK after setting up airbase defence of Muharraq.

- No. 26 Squadron RAF Regiment

26 Squadron RAF Regiment, RAF Laarbruch Commander Sqn Ldr Dipper. Deployed 28 November 1990 to 14 February 1991. Used to defend the airfield before Patriot was even conceived. In the aftermath of the Iraqi invasion of Kuwait, the squadron deployed to Saudi Arabia and detachments saw service at Dharan, Muharraq, and Tabuk during the war. Successfully deployed all equipment within 10 days of arrival

- No. 34 Squadron RAF Regiment

34 Squadron RAF Regiment deployed to Bahrain and Dahrhan in August 1990.

- No. 51 Squadron RAF Regiment

In aftermath of the Iraqi invasion of Kuwait, the squadron deployed to Saudi Arabia, and detachments saw service at Dharan, Muharraq, and Tabuk during the war.

- No. 58 Squadron RAF Regiment

58 Squadron RAF Regiment deployed from RAF Catterick in January 1991 to Bahrain to allow 1 Squadron RAF Regiment to deploy to the front. With only three days notice, those three days included all kitting and ANTHRAX jabs.

- No. 66 Squadron RAF Regiment

=== Other RAF units ===
- 4626 Aeromed Evac Squadron (Co-located with 205 Fd Hosp RAMC and in Cyprus)
- United Kingdom Mobile Air Movements Squadron deployed on the first Hercules and served throughout the Gulf at all air heads and landing strips.
- Joint Helicopter Support Unit deployed with the Chinook Squadrons
- Tactical Communications Wing
- Tactical Supply Wing

== Royal Navy ==
Aircraft carrier

- Invincible class
  - HMS Ark Royal (deployed to the Mediterranean Sea)

Frigates

- Leander class
  - HMS Jupiter
  - HMS Charybdis (deployed to the Mediterranean Sea)
- Type 22 frigate
  - HMS Battleaxe
  - HMS Brazen
    - 829 Naval Air Squadron with the Westland Lynx HAS.3
  - HMS Sheffield (deployed to the Mediterranean Sea)
  - HMS London (Flagship)
    - 815 Naval Air Squadron with the Westland Lynx HAS.3

Destroyers

- Sheffield class
  - HMS Cardiff
    - 815 Naval Air Squadron with the Westland Lynx HAS.3
  - HMS Exeter
    - 815 Naval Air Squadron with the Westland Lynx HAS.3
  - HMS Manchester
    - 815 Naval Air Squadron with the Westland Lynx HAS.2
  - HMS Gloucester
    - 815 Naval Air Squadron with the Westland Lynx HAS.3
  - HMS York

Command ships

- Hecla class
  - HMS Herald
  - HMS Hecla

Mine countermeasure vessels

- Hunt class
  - HMS Ledbury
  - HMS Cattistock
  - HMS Dulverton
  - HMS Bicester
  - HMS Atherstone
  - HMS Hurworth

Submarines

- Oberon-class submarines
  - HMS Opossum
  - HMS Otus

Royal Fleet Auxiliary

- RFA Argus
  - HM Royal Marines Band Commander in Chief Fleet
  - 846 Naval Air Squadron with 4 x Westland Sea King HC Mk4
  - 21 (AD) Bty RA with Javelin Air Defence System
- RFA Diligence
- RFA Fort Grange
  - 826 with the Westland Sea King HC.5 & 846 Naval Air Squadron with the Westland Sea King HC.4
- RFA Regent
- RFA Olna
  - 846 Naval Air Squadron with the Westland Sea King HC.4
- RFA Olmeda
- RFA Orangeleaf
- RFA Sir Bedivere
- RFA Sir Galahad
- RFA Sir Percivale
- RFA Sir Tristram

=== Fleet Air Arm ===
Deployed to land bases

- 845 Naval Air Squadron with Westland Sea King HC.4s
- 848 Naval Air Squadron with Westland Sea King HC.4s
- 846 Naval Air Squadron with Westland Sea King HC.4s (Detached from RFA Argus)

=== Fleet Diving Group ===
- Fleet Diving Group A & B

Embarked on RFA Sir Galahad

- members of FDU1 Maritime Counter terrorist Unit and members of FDU2 Worldwide Operations Unit.
- Fleet Diving Group C

Embarked on RFA Argus

- Members of Fleet Diving Unit 3, deep diving and Trials Team

== See also ==
- List of Gulf War military equipment
- List of orders of battle
