= List of equipment of the RAF Regiment =

RAF Regiment equipment

This is a list of equipment currently used by the Royal Air Force Regiment. The RAF Regiment is the ground fighting force of the Royal Air Force and contributes to the defence of RAF airfields in the UK and overseas, and provides Joint Terminal Attack Controllers (JTACs) to the British Army and Royal Marines, and a contingent to the Special Forces Support Group from No. II (Parachute) Squadron.

The equipment of the RAF Regiment has a high degree of commonality with the rest of the British Armed Forces, particularly the British Army.

== Specialist equipment ==
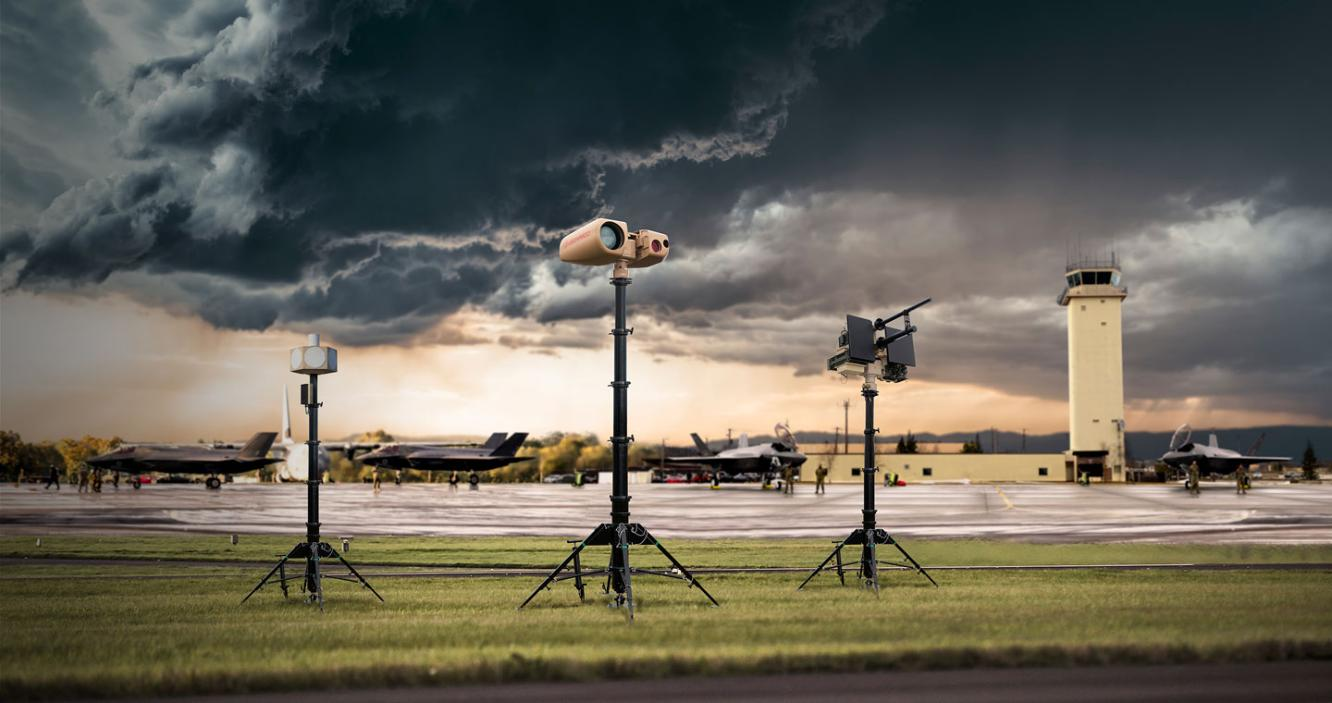
The ORCUS CUAS system.

=== Counter Uncrewed Air Systems ===
No. 63 Squadron (King's Colour Squadron) and No. 34 Squadron RAF Regiment also operate the ORCUS Counter-Unmanned Aerial System. It relies on an electronic-attack countermeasure to intercept and jam radio signals from hostile drones, rather than a kinetic interceptor.

The system consists of the Leonardo Guardian, which provides the long range jamming effect, the US Air Force-developed NINJA technology, which takes control of a hostile drones protocols at short range and manoeuvres it to a safe location, and SKYPERION which is a passive RF detection sensor which is used to detect, track and identify multiple drones at the same time.

=== FireStorm System ===
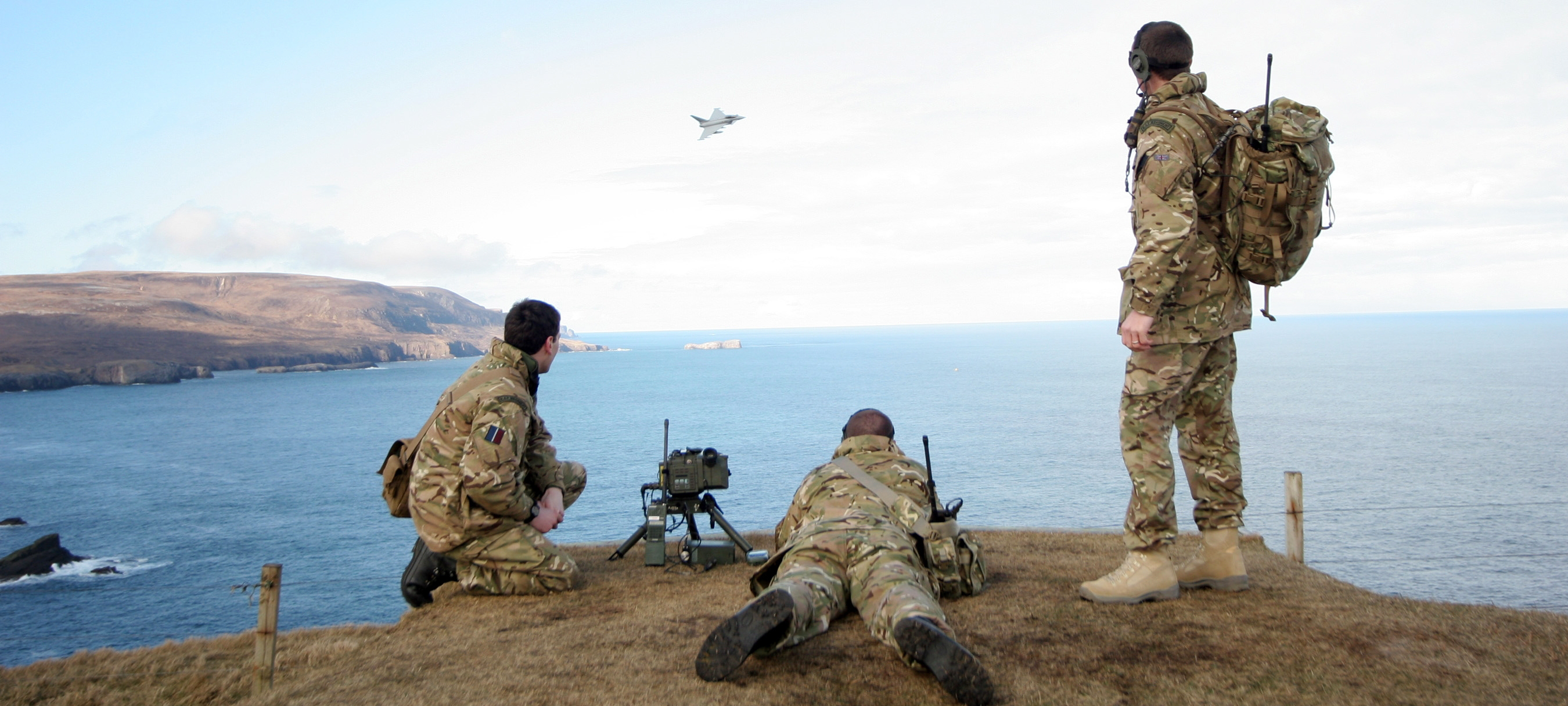
RAF Regiment Forward Air Controllers (FACs), also known as JTACs, guiding a Eurofighter Typhoon onto their target.

The Royal Air Force Regiment Joint Terminal Attack Controllers (JTACs) support the British Armed Forces. A JTAC’s job is to coordinate close air support (CAS), an attack by fighter jets, helicopter gunships, and armed drones in close proximity to friendly soldiers. JTACs are selected through aptitude screening before undertaking the 8-week JTAC-Certification Course at the Joint Forward Air Controller Training and Standardisation Unit (JFACTSU) based at RAF Leeming.

To do this, they utilise the Collins FireStorm, which is a lightweight and modular integrated targeting system that is designed to enable JTACs to accurately locate the enemy and generate coordinates to enable a precision strike. The system is interoperable with the F-35 Lightning II, the multi-role stealth fighter in service with the Royal Air Force. It provides digital connectivity with virtually all coalition aircraft, field artillery systems, and command-and-control centres. A laser range finder, tactical PC, handheld azimuth augmentation unit and the StrikeHawk video downlink receiver is included in the system.

== Weapons ==
Name	Origin	Type	Calibre	Image	Details
L85A3	United Kingdom	Assault rifle	5.56×45mm NATO		The SA80 is the standard-issue assault rifle with an effective range of 600 m and a 30-round magazine. Primarily fitted with the Elcan SpecterOS 4X Lightweight Day Sights. The ARILLS (Assault Rifle In-Line Low Light Sight) and Laser Light Module (LLM Mk3) can also be attached in low-light conditions.
L131A1	Austria	Semi-automatic pistol	9×19mm Parabellum		The Glock 17 General Service Pistol (GSP) is the current secondary side arm used for close combat with a magazine capacity of 17 rounds. It is carried as a backup weapon by frontline personnel.
L129A1, L129A2	United States	Sharpshooter rifle	7.62×51mm NATO		The primary designated marksman rifle, 'Sharpshooter' is equipped with an ACOG optical sight for long-range engagements. There is also a Sniper Support Weapon version fitted with a L17A2 Schmidt & Bender 3–12 x 50 Sniper Scope and Surefire Suppressor for use by the second man in each sniper team.
L7A2	United Kingdom; Belgium	General-purpose machine gun	7.62×51mm NATO		The designated general purpose machine gun (GPMG) for sustained fire out to 1,800m. The GPMG can be used in the sustained fire (SF) role, which requires a two-person team to operate, the light support role, with a single soldier wearing a carrying shoulder strap, or mounted (on a vehicle or sangar).
L115A3	United Kingdom	Sniper rifle	8.6x70mm (.338 Lapua Magnum)		The Accuracy International L115A3 is the primary precision rifle for RAF Regiment snipers. It is equipped with a 25x scope, suppressor, folding stock, five-round .338 Lapua Magnum magazine and has an effective range of over 1,100m. The L115A3 was developed as part of the Sniper System Improvement Programme to replace the L96 and L115A1 sniper rifles.
Heckler & Koch AG36 (L123A3)	Germany	Underslung grenade launcher	40×46mm		The Underslung Grenade Launcher (UGL) is a modified variant of the H&K AG36 and fires a range of 40 mm rounds including high explosive, smoke, CS gas and red phosphorus out to distances of 350m. It is usually carried by the section 2IC.
NLAW	United Kingdom; Sweden	Anti-tank guided missile	150 mm		Man-portable, short range fire-and-forget anti-tank guided missile system designed for non-expert use. It is designed to "rapidly knock out any main battle tank in just one shot by striking it from above".
FGM-148 Javelin	United States	Anti-tank guided missile	127 mm		Man-portable medium range anti-tank missile system. It fires a high-explosive anti-tank (HEAT) warhead and can penetrate explosive reactive armour. The Javelin has several modes of flight including direct and an overfly-top-attack mode in which the missile arcs high then flies down onto the top of the target, thus getting around the heavy front armour of modern tanks.
L16A2	United Kingdom	Mortar	81 mm		The 81mm Mortar provides indirect fire support that enables RAF Regiment Gunners to engage targets outside of their line-of-sight, up to a range of 5.5 km (3.4 mi) at a rate of 15 rounds-per-minute. The modernised L16A2 features GPS and laser-range finding systems, dramatically increasing the weapon's accuracy. It fires high explosive, red phosphorus smoke, illuminating, and infared illuminating.
L1A2, L111A1	United States	Heavy machine gun	.50 BMG		The L1A2 / L111A1 is the RAF Regiment's version of the M2 Browning. It can be attached to both armoured and soft-skin vehicles, or a ground-mount tripod. The weapon fires .50 calibre rounds at a rate of 485–635 rounds-per-minute out to an effective range of 2,000 metres.
Heckler & Koch GMG (L134A1)	Germany	Grenade machine gun	40×53mm		The L134A1 is used for the suppression of enemy infantry and can be mounted on both armoured vehicles and tripods. It combines the advantages of a heavy machine gun and a mortar in one; delivering a high rate of fire with fragmentation effect. The weapon has a 320 rpm rate of fire and an effective range of 1,500 m (4,900 ft)-2,000 m (6,600 ft).

== Land vehicles ==
Name	Origin	Type	Image	Details
Jackal 2	United Kingdom	Protected mobility vehicle		Armament includes a 7.62mm GPMG and either a .50-calibre HMG or 40mm GMG as the main weapon system.
Foxhound	United Kingdom	Protected mobility vehicle	Foxhound	Foxhound is lighter and smaller than other protected vehicles, carries a crew of six and a 7.62mm GPMG armament, and has a top speed of 82 mph, but can still protect against improvised explosive devices, thanks to its v-shaped hull.
Land Rover Wolf	United Kingdom	Utility vehicle		The Land Rover Wolf is the military version of the Land Rover Defender. In RAF Regiment service it comes in 2 main varieties: the more common Truck Utility Medium (TUM), based on the Defender 110; and the Truck Utility Light (TUL), based on the shorter-wheelbase Defender 90.
Grizzly 450	Japan	All-terrain vehicle		Quad bikes are used as light transport, including evacuation of casualties or movement of supplies.

== Uniforms ==
The Multi-Terrain Pattern (MTP) Personal Clothing System (PCS) is used by all branches of the British Armed Forces and consists of windproof smocks, combat shirts, under-body-armour combat shirts (UBACS), trousers and a variety of sweat-wicking T-shirts, antimicrobial socks and underpants, and thermal fleeces, T-shirts and long johns, as well as waterproof Gore-Tex jackets, over-trousers and gaiters. Multi-Terrain Pattern is designed to blend with a large variety of environments including woodland, jungle, compounds, crops, grassland and arid stone. On the MTP outer layers, buttons have been replaced with Velcro for greater comfort under body armour. PCS is treated with insect repellant and is flame-resistant.

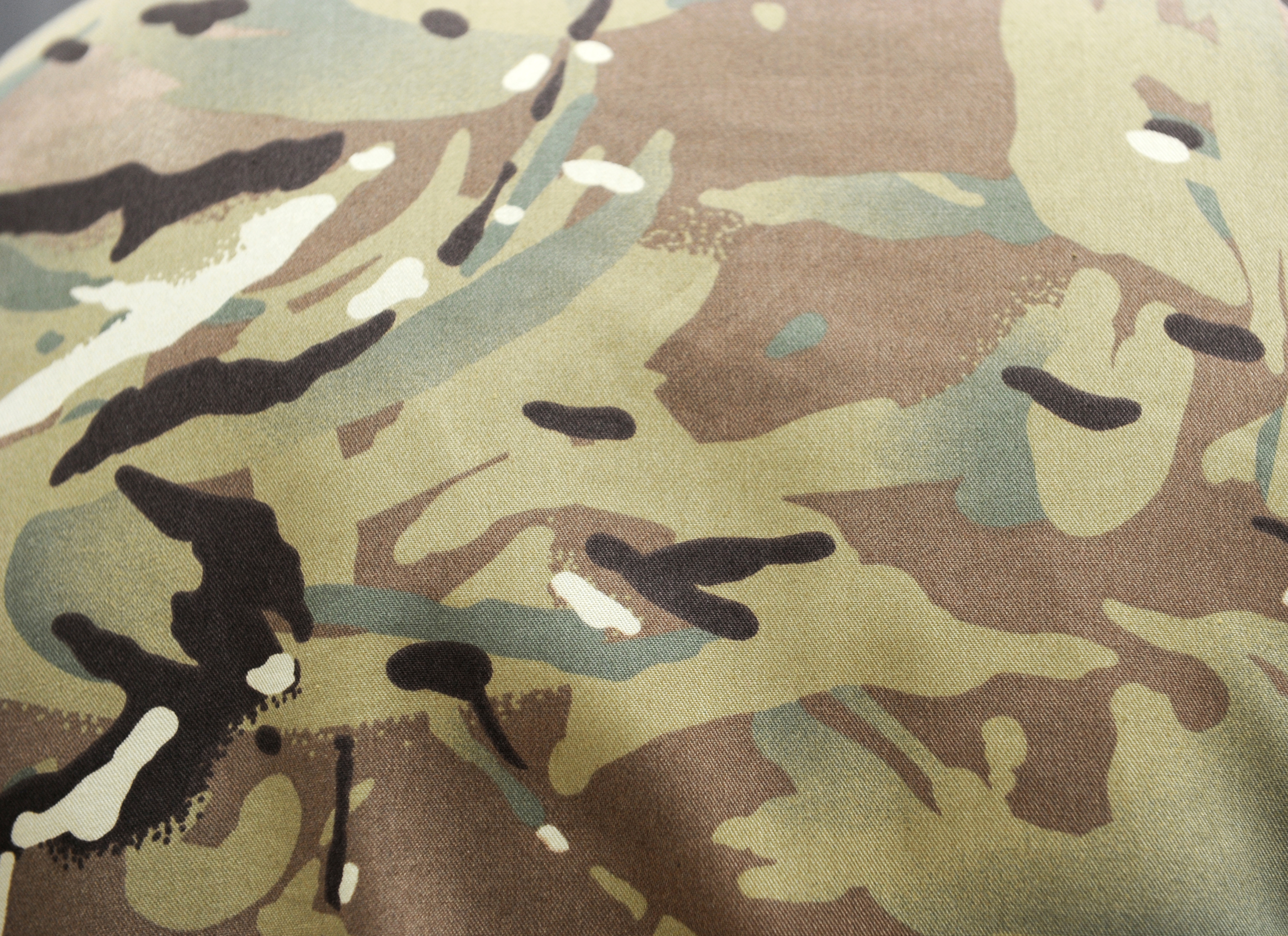
Multi-Terrain Pattern.

RAF Regiment soldiers are issued 5 types of brown-coloured combat boots; High Liability Combat Boots, Patrol Boots, High Liability Desert Combat Boots, Cold Wet Weather Boots and Jungle Combat Boots, typically of the Altberg (via Iturri S.A.), AKU, HAIX and YDS brands which currently hold contracts with Ministry of Defence.

== Aerial drone ==
Gunners from No. 15 Squadron RAF Regiment in 2022 were trialling the Ghost Drone, an unmanned aerial vehicle used for intelligence gathering and reconnaissance. It can fly for up to 55 minutes, has a range of around 12km, or 25 km with Long-Range Tracking Antenna, and can operate in all weather conditions, at temperatures as low as −40°C, and at an altitude of up to 12,000ft.

== See also ==
Other lists:

- List of equipment of the British Army
- List of equipment of the Royal Marines
- List of active United Kingdom military aircraft
- List of RAF Regiment units
- List of Royal Air Force stations
