= No. 16 Squadron RAF Regiment =

Disbanded Royal Air Force Regiment Squadron

- Active: 1948–2006
- Disbanded: 2006
- Country: United Kingdom
- Branch: Royal Air Force
- Role: Ground Based Air Defence (GBAD)
- Size: 100 personnel (1998)
- Motto: All Points We Defend

No. 16 Squadron RAF Regiment was a field squadron of the Royal Air Force Regiment. The squadron operated mostly outside the United Kingdom since its formation in 1948 until 2006 when it was disbanded. It started out as a field squadron before becoming involved in the GBAD programme, where it operated the Rapier missile system.

== History ==
No. 16 Squadron RAF Regiment was formed at RAF Watchet in 1948. During the Cyprus crisis of 1963–64, elements of No. 16 Squadron were used to bolster the numbers of 3 Wing RAF Regiment on the island of Cyprus. The squadron also deployed as part of 33 Wing HQ RAF Regiment to Northern Ireland, along with No.s 37 Squadron and 48 Squadron. Their mission was part of Operation Banner and the area they had to secure bordered the Irish Republic.

During its tenure at RAF Wildenrath in the 1980s, No. 16 Squadron assumed the airfield defence role from No. 25 Squadron RAF, who had previously operated the Bloodhound missile system. No. 25 Squadron returned to an aircraft role at RAF Leeming operating the Tornado F3 variant. No. 16 Squadron used the Rapier Missile system and operated under No. 4 Wing RAF.

Whilst operating out of Germany in May 1988, two unarmed members of the squadron, along with a third serviceman, were shot by terrorist forces in Holland. All were killed outright, with some senior members of the IRA stating that the killings were revenge for the SAS shootings in Gibraltar.

Whilst deployed to Iraq in 2003 on Operation Telic, one of the gunner's on the squadron, Duncan Pritchard, was severely injured in a road traffic accident and died after being evacuated back to Britain. In 2005, the squadron was awarded the battle honour of Iraq 2003 by the Queen, though this was without the right to emblazon the honour on their standard.

A Defence Review in 2004 removed the airfield defence capability from the RAF Regiment, and along with 15, 26 and 37 Squadrons, No. 16 Squadron was put on notice of disbandment by March 2007. Between the announcement of disbandment in 2004 and its eventual demise in September 2006, the squadron deployed to Kabul and the Falkland Islands.

== Locations ==
- RAF Watchet
- RAF Upavon
- RAF Wattisham
- RAF Innsworth
- RAF Felixstowe
- RAF Upwood
- RAF Catterick
- RAF Wildenrath
- RAF Honington
