= No. 2623 Squadron RAuxAF Regiment =

- Active: 1 July 1979 – present
- Country: United Kingdom
- Branch: Royal Air Force
- Type: Air Force Infantry
- Role: Force protection
- Garrison/HQ: RAF Honington
- Mottos: Gebeorgan Ond Werian (Protect and Defend)

Insignia
- Identification symbol: Wolf Salient

No. 2623 (East Anglian) Squadron RAuxAF Regiment is a Royal Auxiliary Air Force RAF Regiment reserve squadron based at RAF Honington. It was formed on 1 July 1979 to provide ground defence of the station. Tasked with preventing Soviet Special Forces from disrupting flying operations, personnel were recruited from across East Anglia and formed an integral part of the station's war-fighting capability for the next 15 years. Throughout this period, the squadron participated in many exercises and held annual camps in the United Kingdom, Germany and Gibraltar, winning the Strickland Trophy competition in 1991.

== History ==
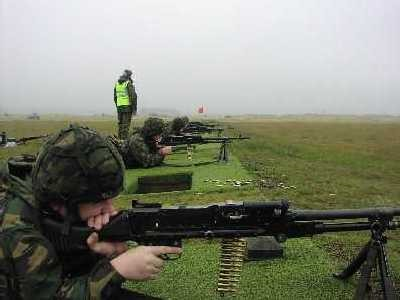
2623sqn RAuxAF Regiment Shooting GPMG on range

The squadron disbanded as a field squadron on 18 April 1994, reforming on 1 June 1995 as a training unit, providing centralised training to the Royal Auxiliary Air Force Regiment field Squadrons, resulting in the word "Training" being added to the squadron's title to reflect the new role. This role was later subsumed into Training Wing at Royal Air Force Honington and the squadron subsequently switched roles again.

The Strategic Defence Review in the mid -1990s had identified the need to provide sustainment of the Royal Air Force's Ground Based Air Defence Force. As a result, the squadron resumed its original title and took on a new role in October 1998 with a mix of regulars and auxiliaries operating the highly sophisticated Rapier Field Standard C missile system, being declared operational in its new role in April 2001. In May 2003, many of the squadron's personnel were mobilised and deployed to the Falkland Islands to augment No. 16 Squadron Royal Air Force Regiment as the Resident Rapier Squadron, providing the ground based air defence of the Mount Pleasant Complex from July 2003 to January 2004. Ground based air defence passed to the Royal Artillery in entirety following the 2004 Defence Review, but under Royal Air Force command. At the same time, a need for the squadron to provide a new capability was also highlighted, resulting in the squadron taking on a new role once again to provide a key component of the Joint Nuclear Biological and Chemical Regiment's operational output from March 2004. Deploying to Canada in 2005 and then Cyprus in 2006, the squadron won the Inspector's Cup for Excellence in 2007 and Kemp Dirk for recruiting during 2008.

In June 2008, No.8 Force Protection Wing was stood up to undertake a single operational tour at Kandahar Airfield within Operation HERRICK. The Wing comprised Headquarter elements from Royal Air Force Henlow, together with No. 27 Squadron RAF Regiment and No. 2623 Squadron Royal Air Force Regiment and resulted in a temporary change to a purely Dismounted Close Combat role for both squadrons. The Wing deployed to Kandahar Airfield from August 2009 to February 2010 and a large number of reservist personnel from 2623 Squadron were mobilised, serving within both 27 Squadron and the Wing Headquarters itself. On completion of the operational tour, both squadrons returned to their previous role.

The squadron was presented with its Standard to commemorate 25 years service by Queen Elizabeth II at a unique ceremony held at Royal Air Force Marham on 18 July 2010. Since the disbanding of the Joint Chemical, Biological, Radiological and Nuclear Regiment, the squadron has supported 26 and 27 Sqns RAF Regiment in their role forming the RAF's Defence CBRN Wing.

=== The squadron badge ===
The Standard features the squadron badge, which was awarded in 1988. The badge demonstrates the squadron's links with East Anglia, with the wolf salient representing the 'Wolfmen' – the Danes who ravages and then settled in East Anglia during the Dark Ages. The crossed arrows represent the martyrdom of St Edmund and allude to the squadron's association with the local town of Bury St Edmunds. The motto 'Gebeorgan Ond Werian' is Anglo-Saxon, and can be loosely translated as Protect and Defend.

== See also ==
- (Aden Colony) Aden Protectorate Levies
- (Australia) Airfield Defence Guards
- (United Kingdom) Band of the Royal Air Force Regiment
- (Chile) Comandos de Aviación
- (France) Fusiliers Commandos de l'Air
- (Germany) German Air Force Regiment
- Iraq Levies
- Japan Air Self-Defense Force
- (Portugal) Polícia Aérea
- Sri Lanka Air Force Regiment
- United States Air Force Security Forces
