= No. 3 Squadron RAF Regiment =

Disbanded Royal Air Force Regiment Squadron

No. 3 Squadron, RAF Regiment
- Active: 3 November 1922 – 1 April 1925 (As No. 3 Armoured Car Company) 1940 - 19 December 1941 (As No. 757 Defence Squadron); 19 December 1941 - August, 1947 (As No. 2757 Squadron); August 1947 - 1 November 1955 (As No. 3 (Armoured Car) Squadron); 1 January 1956 – 30 September 1957 (As No. 3 (Light Anti Aircraft) Squadron Royal Air Force Regiment) 27 July 1987–14 April 2015 (As No. 3 Squadron RAF Regiment)
- Country: United Kingdom
- Branch: Royal Air Force
- Type: Force Protection
- Role: Ground Defence
- Garrison/HQ: RAF Wittering
- Motto: In Arduis Audax (Bold in Adversity)

Commanders
- Last OC: Sqn Ldr Phil Skorge

No. 3 Squadron RAF Regiment was a field squadron of the RAF Regiment in the Royal Air Force. Its mission was protection of RAF bases from ground attack.

== Early history ==
The history of No. 3 (Field) Squadron Royal Air Force Regiment dates back to the inter-war years, before the formation of the Royal Air Force Regiment itself. It was Lord Trenchard's philosophy in the 1920s that, to support light bombers in their policing of large areas in the Middle East, Armoured Car Companies should be formed, manned by Royal Air Force officers and airmen and under Royal Air Force control. No. 3 Armoured Car Company was formed on 3 November 1922 at Basra and served in eastern Iraq. The Company conducted operations both on its own and in co-operation with aircraft against disaffected Kurdish tribes over a wide area of southern and eastern Iraq. On 1 April 1925 the Company was disbanded and its personnel and vehicles were distributed among the remaining Armoured Car Companies.

== Second World War ==
The Second World War was the first war in which air power was to play a decisive role. The rear, which historically had always been protected by the front, would be wide open to the enemy's air and deep penetration forces on the ground unless these could be counted on equal terms. This threat to Royal Air Force stations was initially countered by the formation of Defence Squadrons. No. 757 Defence Squadron was formed at RAF Nutts Corner in Northern Ireland in late 1940 and on 19 December 1941 was re-numbered to No. 2757 Squadron. However, the scale of the German assault in Crete and the speed at which the airfield had fallen acted as a catalyst on British Defence planning and highlighted the need for the coordinated defence of airfields.

The Chiefs of Staff accepted the recommendations of the resultant report that the Royal Air Force should form its own Aerodrome Defence Corps. Thus on 2 February 1942 the Royal Air Force Regiment, a Corps formed as an integral part of the Royal Air Force, came into being. No. 2757 Squadron was absorbed into the new Corps and acquired a mobile defence role and by the time it reached Europe on 20 August 1944, it was organised as an Armoured Car Squadron.

During the Campaign in North Western Europe the Squadron was continually on the move seeing active service in France, Belgium, the Netherlands and Germany. During these final stages of the war the Squadron was mainly tasked with escort duties, protecting Air Technical Intelligence staff on reconnaissance missions to a wide variety of targets which included airfields, radar sites and their installations, V-1 flying bomb sites and storage depots.

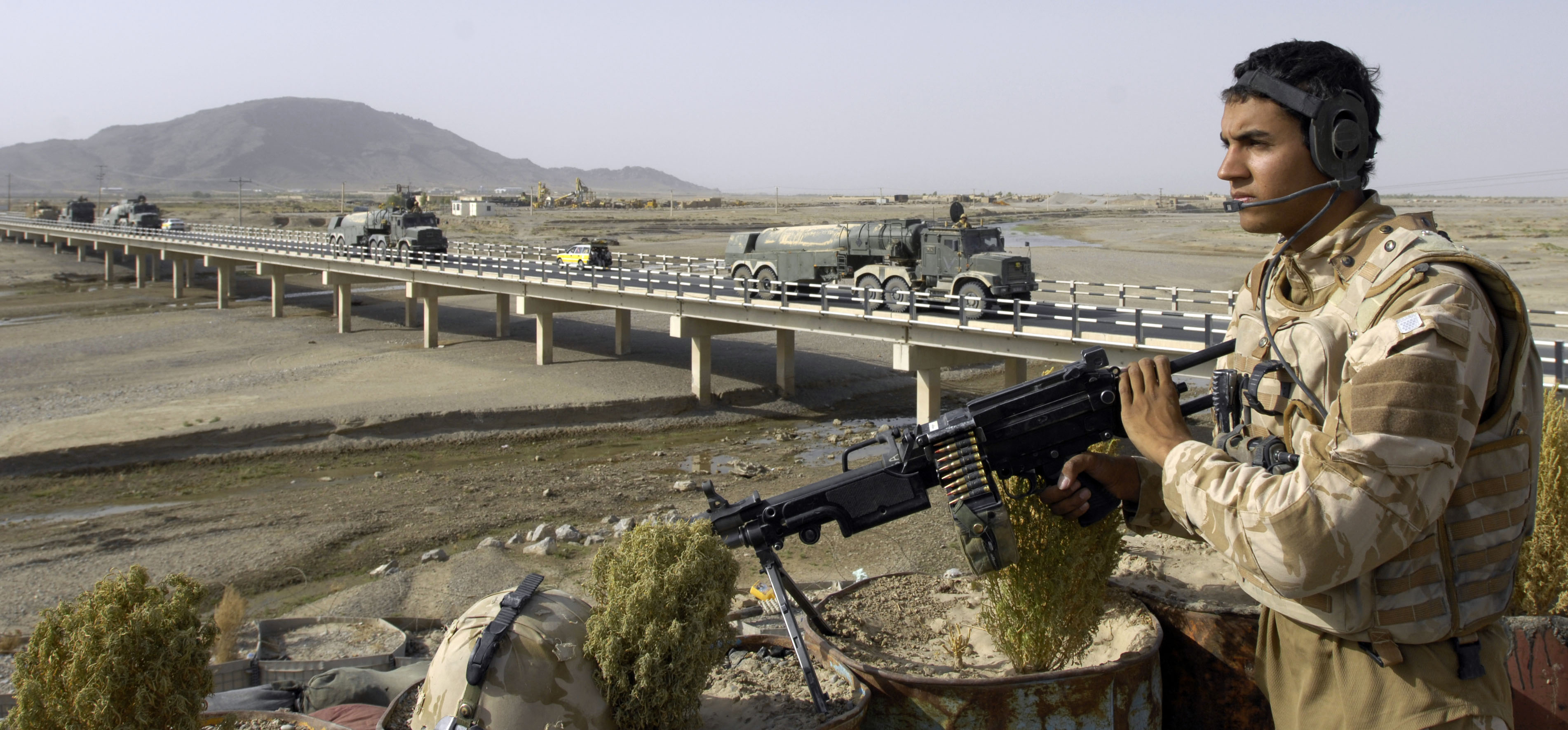
3 Squadron providing over-watch security near Kandahar Airport, Afghanistan, 2008.

== Cold War to Today ==
At the end of the second world war, the Squadron was in Germany as part of the 2nd Tactical Air Force and remained stationed there in the post war period.

In August 1947, the Squadron was re-numbered as No. 3 (Armoured Car) Squadron and continued to serve in Germany at RAF Fassberg and RAF Gütersloh until its disbandment on 1 November 1955. The Squadron was briefly resurrected on 1 January 1956 as No. 3 (Light Anti Aircraft) Squadron Royal Air Force Regiment, before being disbanded again on 30 September 1957. The present Squadron was re-formed on 27 July 1987 at RAF Hullavington on and on 1 February 1988 it moved to RAF Aldergrove, where it served as a Field Squadron. While in Northern Ireland it was tasked primarily with the protection of the military airhead at RAF Aldergrove, the home of the Joint Helicopter Force (Northern Ireland). Additionally, the Squadron regularly provided support to the Police Service of Northern Ireland and routinely deployed personnel to other parts of the Province.

It later relocated to RAF Wittering. The squadron was disbanded on 14 April 2015. Although disbanded in 2015, on 24 March 2020 the squadron was honoured with the right to emblazon ‘AFGHANISTAN 2001-2014’ on their Squadron Standard.
