= No. 2620 Squadron RAuxAF Regiment =

- Active: 1983 - present
- Country: United Kingdom
- Branch: Royal Air Force
- Type: Air Force Infantry
- Role: Force protection
- Garrison/HQ: RAF Marham
- Motto: "Cum Patria Mea Vocat" (When my Country Calls (Latin))

Insignia
- Identification symbol: Griffin azure with golden wings clutching a hayfork

No. 2620 (County of Norfolk) Squadron RAuxAF Regiment is a Royal Auxiliary Air Force RAF Regiment reserve squadron based at RAF Marham, in Norfolk.

== History ==
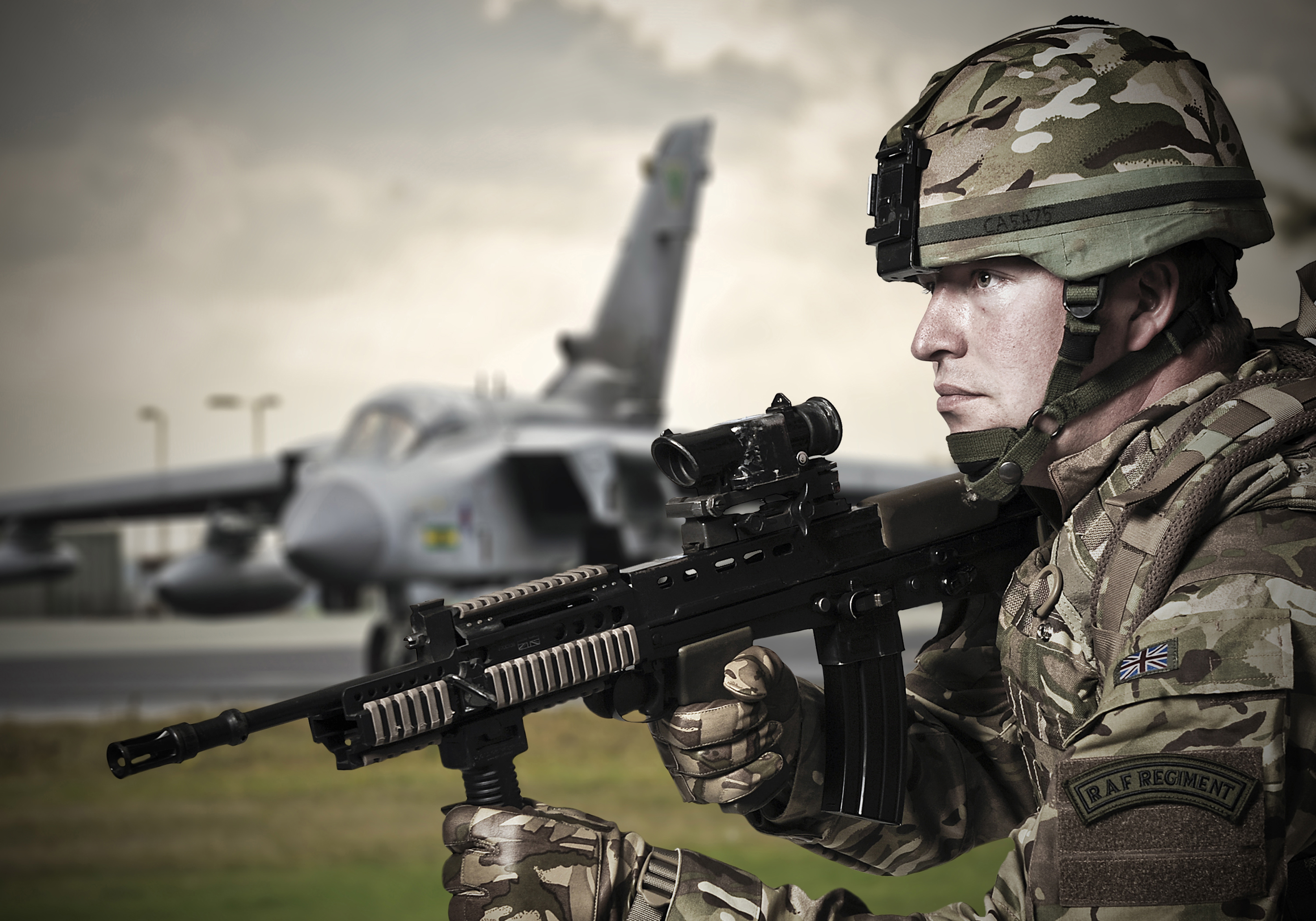
A Gunner from 2620 Squadron.

The squadron was formed in 1983, in RAF Marham, Norfolk, where it has remained ever since, as a field squadron in the auxiliary RAF Regiment. In 2000, it was re-roled as an Operational Support Squadron and in February 2003 it became the first RAF Regiment auxiliary squadron to deploy overseas since 1945 when it was sent to Kuwait as part of Operation Telic in the Iraq War. The squadron reverted to its original status as a field squadron in 2004, and in 2010, was granted a squadron standard by her Majesty the Queen.

Outside of its 2003 deployment as a squadron, members of the squadron have, as individuals or in smaller groups, deployed to the Balkans and to Afghanistan during Operation Herrick. The squadron consists of around 120 men.

The squadron became the third-only reserve RAF Regiment squadron to win the Lloyd Cup for best shots in 2011, amongst other cups and medals for shooting proficiency.
