= No. 2503 Squadron RAuxAF Regiment =

- Active: 1979 - present
- Country: United Kingdom
- Branch: Royal Air Force
- Type: Air Force Infantry
- Role: Force protection
- Garrison/HQ: RAF Waddington
- Mottos: "Freedom of the Skies and of the Land"

No. 2503 (County of Lincoln) Squadron RAuxAF Regiment is a Royal Auxiliary Air Force RAF Regiment reserve squadron based at RAF Waddington, in Lincolnshire. Gunners are recruited both from ex-regulars in the RAF Regiment and civilians in a 50 miles radius surrounding RAF Waddington. The squadron is in the dismounted close-combat force protection role.

== History ==
The squadron was formed on 1 July 1979 at RAF Scampton to provide force protection to the Vulcans being maintained there at the time; in 1985, the squadron was moved to its current home to provide force sustainment for the regular RAF Regiment. The squadron was deployed to Iraq during the Iraq War as part of Operation Telic, and gunners from the squadron have also been deployed to Germany, the Balkans, Kuwait and Afghanistan as part of Operation Herrick.

The squadron standard was presented on 6 December 2005, backdated to July of the previous year.

In 2015, the squadron was tasked with assisting on an archaeological dig, searching for a lost spitfire.
