= No. 34 Squadron RAF Regiment =

Royal Air Force Regiment Squadron

- Active: 1951 - present
- Country: United Kingdom
- Branch: Royal Air Force
- Type: Air Force Infantry
- Role: Counter-UAS
- Part of: Combat Readiness Force
- Garrison/HQ: RAF Leeming
- Mottos: French: Feu de Fer; Fire from Iron
- Battle honours: Iraq 2003-2011*; Honours marked with an asterisk* are those emblazoned on the Squadron Standard
- Website: Official webpage

Commanders
- Apr 24: Sqn Ldr S Gray

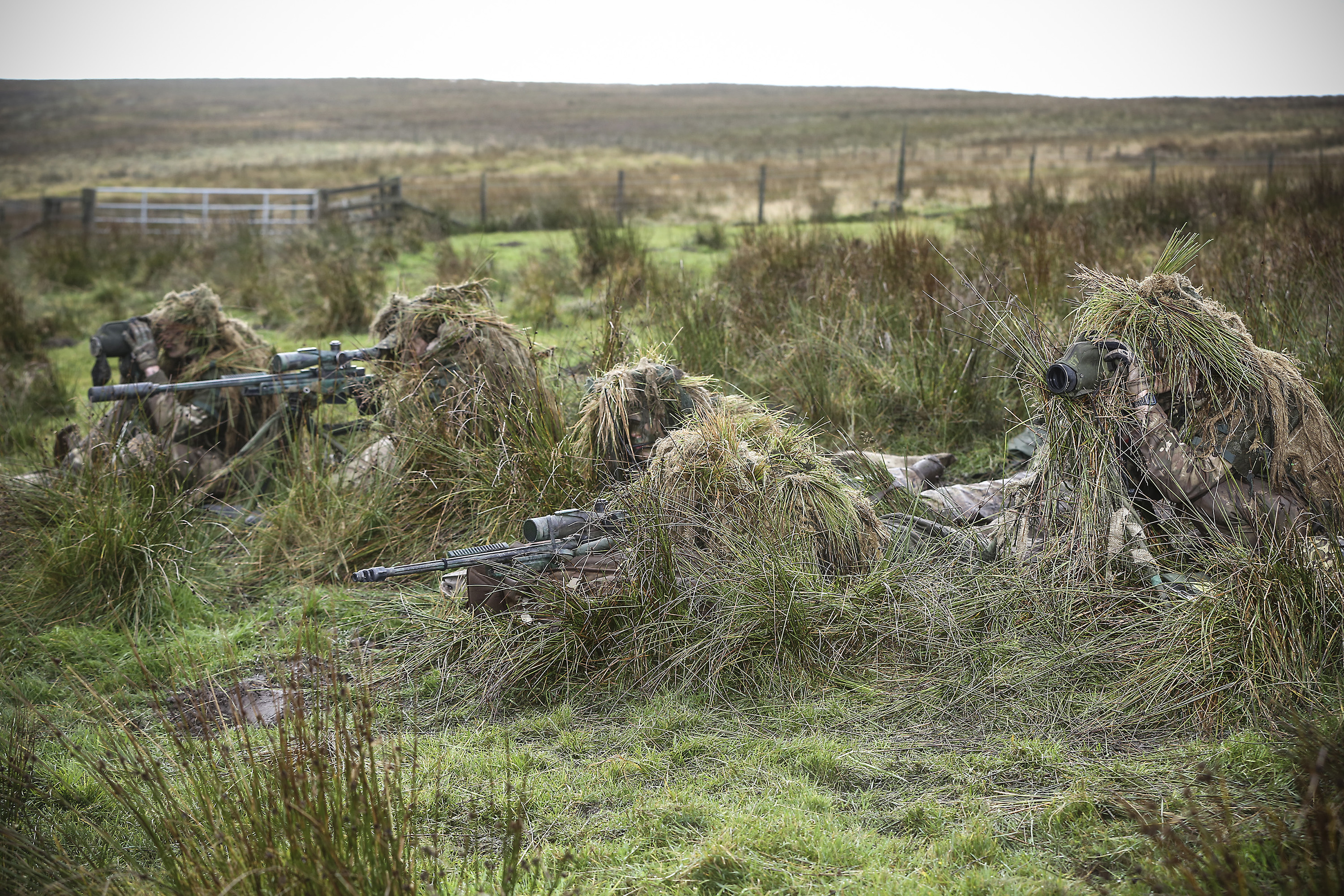
34 Squadron undertake live fire tactical training at Otterburn Camp

No. 34 Squadron RAF Regiment is a C-UAS squadron of the RAF Regiment in the Royal Air Force. Its mission is to detect, track, and ultimately disrupt and destroy unmanned airborne vehicles. The squadron's current HQ is at RAF Leeming. The motto of the squadron is "Feu de Fer "(Fire from Iron).

== History ==
=== Formation and the Cold War 1951–1954 ===
In response to an assessment of NATO airfield low level air defence requirements during the Cold War, 34 Squadron RAF Regiment was formed on 19 November 1951 at RAF Yatesbury. The squadron was immediately deployed overseas as a light anti-aircraft squadron to El Hammra, Egypt and launched a number of operational detachments to the Suez Canal Zone from January 1952. The rise in Arab nationalism and abrogation of the Anglo-Egyptian treaty of 1936 by the Egyptian Government in late 1951, led to increased civil unrest and a heightened threat to British installations. Equipped with the 40mm Bofors L60 gun, it provided not only close air defence of RAF airfields and other assets, but also provided convoy escorts and close protection of senior Air Officers. In 1954, the British withdrew from the Canal Zone and the squadron redeployed to Cyprus to provide low-level air defence to airfields at Akrotiri and Nicosia to counter the EOKA terrorist campaign. Operational detachments continued in Libya, Aden, Iran and Cyprus, including during the Turkish invasion of Cyprus and the subsequent bloody partition.

=== Cyprus ===
For the most part, the squadron secured RAF airfields and other RAF installations on the island, however, it also turned its hand to patrols, convoy escorts and guards for Very Important Persons (VIPs). Strained relations between the Greek and Turkish communities flared into open conflict in 1963 and the squadron deployed to protect British lives and property. The RAF Regiment squadron was one of the first to enter Nicosia on 27 December 1963 to restore peace. 34 Squadron and other Regiment squadrons, helped establish the so-called ‘Green Line’ that had been drawn across Nicosia as a demarcation between the warring communities. Matters quietened until the Turkish invasion of Cyprus in late 1974, when the squadron provided protection to the British Sovereign Base Areas and helped in the evacuation of British dependants from the divided island. From the mid-1970s, still at RAF Akrotiri, it was the sole RAF Regiment squadron in Cyprus, until it was posted to RAF Leeming in 1996.

=== Field and Combat Vehicle Reconnaissance (Tracked) Squadron 1973–1990 ===
In 1975, the squadron was re-rolled to a Field Squadron, exchanging its Bofors 40mm anti-aircraft guns for machine guns, 81mm mortars and Land Rovers. After 25 years, the squadron qualified for its first standard on 19 November 1976 which was later received on 4 October 1979. In 1982, in response to the threat to NATO airfields from the Warsaw Pact, the squadron was one of several to convert to a light armoured role and was equipped with the FV101 Scorpion Combat Vehicle Reconnaissance Tracked (CVR(T)) range of light armoured tracked vehicles. In addition to its role at RAF Akrotiri, it was tasked to deploy at short notice to Northern Europe in case the threat from the Eastern Bloc evolved.

=== Gulf War 1 1990 ===
Following the Iraqi invasion of Kuwait in 1990, the squadron deployed to the Gulf on Operation Granby to provide ground defence of RAF forward bases in Bahrain and Saudi Arabia before returning to its primary responsibility of providing internal security at RAF Akrotiri. The squadron re-roled back to a field squadron in 1993, and in 1996 after 40 years in Cyprus, the squadron handed over responsibility to the British Army and returned to the United Kingdom and its present home, Royal Air Force Leeming in North Yorkshire.

=== Bosnia ===
In 1997, the squadron deployed to Banja Luka as part of the Implementation Force (IFOR) mission in Bosnia-Herzegovina. The squadron undertook patrols under the MND (SW) region and were awarded the Wilkinson Sword of Peace for their efforts.

=== Yugoslavia 1997–1999 ===
In January 1997, the squadron deployed for six months to the Former Republic of Yugoslavia in a security role but also assisted with humanitarian aid projects. With further tensions in Iraq, the squadron deployed in 1998 under Operation BOLTON to Ali Al Salem Air Base in Kuwait located close to the Iraqi border. 34 Squadron took the lead role in securing the base from ground attack, working closely with American and Kuwaiti security forces. Early 1999 saw an element of the squadron assisting the RAF Support Helicopter Force during Operation AGRICOLA in the Former Yugoslavian Republic of Macedonia. Squadron personnel were responsible for the protection of Puma helicopters in a forward operating base near the Kosovan border. By June 1999, an element of the squadron was deployed again to Macedonia to assist in the security of forward elements of KFOR – the Kosovo Stabilisation Force.

=== Operation TELIC (Iraq) 2001–2010 ===
In 2001, the squadron deployed to Oman in support of counter-terrorism operations in Oman followed by a deployment to Kabul International Airport in Afghanistan. On 16 January 2003, 34 Squadron deployed as part of 3 Commando Brigade to Basrah Air Station in Iraq under Operation TELIC. The squadron returned to the UK in April 2003, only to re-deploying back to Basra in September until January 2004 in support of Op TELIC 2. During this deployment, the squadron was responsible for the protection of the Basrah Air Station UK Air Point of Disembarkation and the Headquarters of the Multi National Division South East. Covering an area of approximately 500 km^{2} (190 sq mi), they were also responsible for operations to the South of Basrah City. In 2005, the squadron deployed to Basrah Air Station for the third time. Now on Operation TELIC 5, the squadron provided an airborne reaction force for medical extraction teams and the Division's Weapons Intelligence Section alongside its routine Force Protection (FP) duties. In 2006, the squadron deployed to Afghanistan as the lead element of the RAF FP Force in defence of Kandahar Air Field providing FP to NATO air assets alongside US, Canadian and Romanian forces. The area of operations covered some 300 km (190 mi) and during an intense 5-month tour, the squadron drove back enemy indirect fire teams and responded secured the crash site of Nimrod XV230 and recovering the remains of its crew back to the airfield. The squadron's fourth and final deployment to Basrah on Operation TELIC 10 began in September 2007. Following the UK forces’ hand over of Basrah city to the Iraqi army, the squadron was required to patrol the air station's area of operations alongside British Army units. During the squadron's tour, Basrah Airport came under near continuous indirect fire attacks totalling more than 300 surface to surface rockets.

=== Operation HERRICK (Afghanistan) 2007–2015 ===
Following the end of Operation TELIC, 34 Squadron became fully committed to Operation HERRICK, Afghanistan. The tempo of operations for the squadron was exceptionally high across this period, with as little as 10 months between deployments. The continual burden of preparing for and deploying on very high threat combat operations was tremendous. Over the 8 1/2 years, the squadron spent 41 months on operations. Squadron personnel operated in the face of a constant threat from a highly organised and determined enemy throughout all of these deployments. The intelligence threat picture clearly highlighted enemy capability and intent to attack and disrupt coalition operations in the vicinity of Kandahar, Camp Bastion and Kabul. This threat reporting was confirmed throughout Operation HERRICK with countless routine Improvised Explosive Device (IED) finds and harassing Indirect Fire attacks against all squadron locations. The threat was also confirmed with a number of successful attacks on coalition forces. In October 2009, Acting Corporal Marcin Wojtak of 34 Squadron was killed by a bomb blast whilst out on patrol near to Camp Bastion in Helmand province. Throughout Operation HERRICK, squadron personnel were tasked to provide the helicopter Medical Emergency Response Team (MERT) with on-board organic FP, exposing gunners and aircrew to anti-aircraft threat. Throughout this period, the MERT flew into numerous violent small arms and IED contacts to recover casualties under fire. In total, 34 Squadron gunners flew on 159 MERT missions into numerous violent fire fights, recovering 474 casualties. The squadron was amongst the last lift of Coalition Forces to leave Camp Bastion, handing over the airfield to the Afghan Security Forces on 27 October 2014 having provided FP until the last possible moment and bringing to an end the 9-year campaign.

=== Post Afghanistan Era ===
Following the end of operations in Afghanistan, 34 Squadron resumed readiness for short-notice contingency deployments. The ‘War on terrorism’, the rise of ISIS in Iraq and Syria and a resurgent Russia demanded flexible FP of RAF assets. In 2016, the squadron assumed very high readiness standby for global FP operations, supporting a number of RAF air transport flights into high risk areas with on-board air mobility protection teams. In 2017, the squadron was tasked with provision of Force Protection teams to Operation SHADER, supporting air operations against ISIS from Akrotiri, Cyprus, Erbil and Kurdistan. In addition, the squadron provided a security team for No. 3 Squadron Typhoons conducting enhanced forward presence operations in Romania in order to deter Russian aggression in the Baltic States. In October 2017 the squadron was awarded the Operation TELIC battle honour with right to emblazon, for its contribution to the post-war reconstruction of Iraq. It became a Light Armoured Squadron and become equipped with Foxhound and Panther wheeled armoured vehicles along with Weapon Mounted Land Rovers and quad bikes in order to assume the role of ‘early entry’ RAF FP.

=== C-UAS role ===
In the summer of 2022, the Sqn re-roled as a Counter Unmanned Aircraft System (C-UAS) unit.

In November 2024, the squadron was deployed to US air bases in the UK; RAF Mildenhall, RAF Lakenheath, and RAF Feltwell, in response to numerous unidentified drone sightings. Personnel will operate the Orcus Counter-Uncrewed Air System at these bases for as long as the threat remains.

== Structure ==
34 Squadron RAF Regiment consists of 164 personnel, including specialist engineering and support staff.
The squadron's firepower is provided by a wide range of infantry weapons including:

- Individual Weapons SA80
- Sniper rifles L115A3
- General-purpose machine guns

34 Squadron use the ORCUS C-UAS system (non kinetic). They also have communications systems experts, asurveillance and night observation equipment complete the squadron's inventory to make it a flexible force capable of deploying anywhere in the world to defend British air assets or to take part in wider military action.

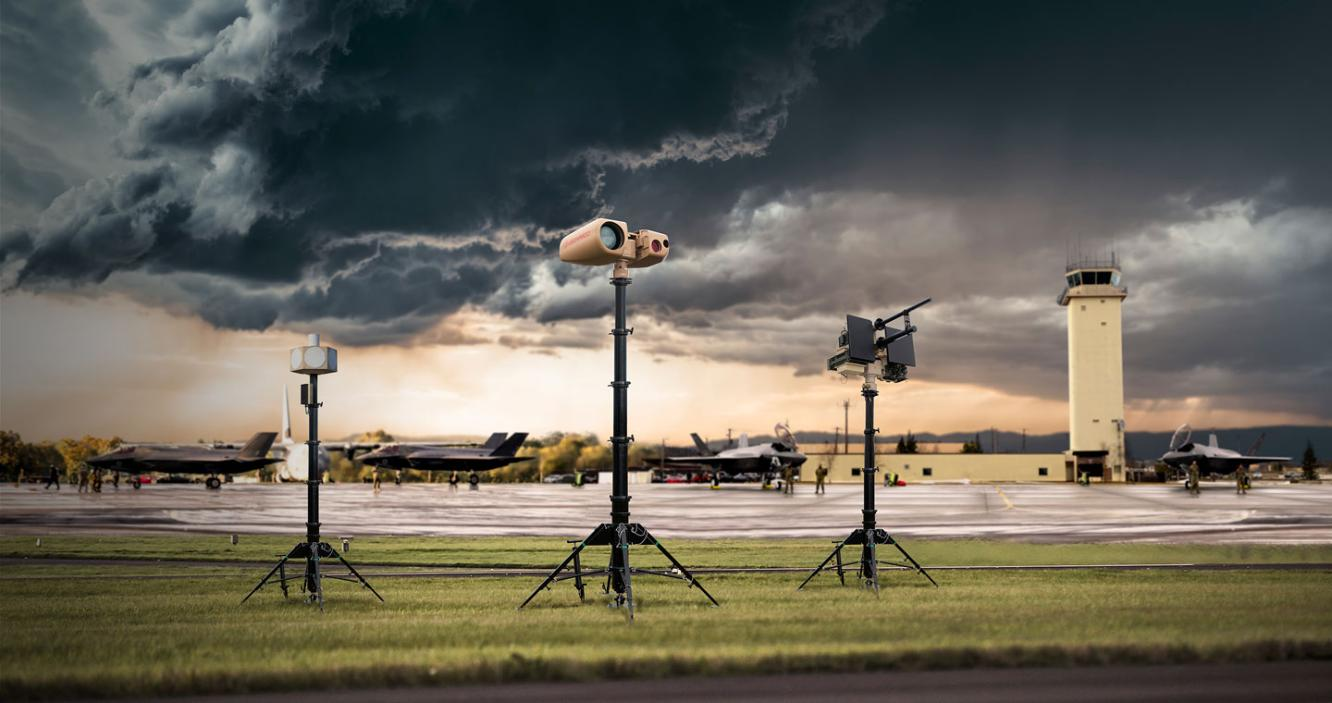
The ORCUS equipment

It is one of two C-UAS units of the RAF Regiment, including No. 63 Squadron RAF Regiment.
