= No. 20 Squadron RAF Regiment =

Disbanded Royal Air Force Regiment Squadron

- Active: 1985 - 1995
- Disbanded: Approx 1995
- Country: UK
- Allegiance: UK/NATO
- Branch: Royal Air Force
- Role: Short Range Air Defence (SHORAD)
- Size: Approx 150
- Motto: United in defence
- Equipment: Rapier Field Standard B1(M)

No. 20 Squadron RAF Regiment, formed approximately 1985, disbanded 1 April 1995 (re numbered as Number 15 Sqn RAF Regiment manning FSC Rapier). Based at RAF Honington, equipped with Rapier Field Standard B1(M). As part of 6 Wing RAF Regiment, its role was to defend USAF airbases in the UK. A Flight was tasked to provide short range air defence (SHORAD) at RAF Alconbury, and B Flight was tasked to defend RAF Bentwaters. In August 1990, 20 Sqn was released from this role to take part in Operation Granby, deploying first to RAF Akrotiri, and then to Muharraq Airfield, Bahrain. The Squadron was among the first British ground troops in theatre, and returned to the UK in November 1990. The Sqn Leader for this deployment was Sqn Leader Bill Lacey The Sqn deployed to the Falklands in 1995 Commanding Officer for this tour was Squadron Leader Steve Abbots.
