= RAF Regiment =

Force security element of Royal Air Force

The Royal Air Force Regiment
- The badge of the RAF Regiment
- Active: 1 February 1942 – present
- Country: United Kingdom
- Branch: Royal Air Force
- Type: Air force infantry
- Role: Force protection
- Size: 1,850 regulars (2021), 570 reserves (2016)
- Part of: No. 2 Group, Air Command
- Garrison/HQ: Depot: RAF Honington
- Nicknames: "The Rock Apes"; "Rocks"
- Mottos: Per Ardua (Latin for "Through Adversity") (Individual squadrons also have their own motto.)
- March: Quick: Holyrood; Slow: Centurion

Commanders
- Commandant-General: Air Commodore Paul Hamilton MBE
- Honorary Air Commodore: Air Chief Marshal Sir Stephen Dalton
- Air Commodore-in-Chief: King Charles III

Insignia
- Tactical Recognition Flash

- Shoulder Flash

The Royal Air Force Regiment (RAF Regiment) is part of the Royal Air Force and functions as a specialist corps. Founded by Royal Warrant in 1942, the Corps carries out security tasks relating to the protection of assets and personnel dedicated to the delivery of air power.

RAF Regiment 'Gunners' are personnel trained in disciplines such as infantry tactics, force protection, field craft, sniper, support to special forces operations, CBRN (chemical, biological, radiological and nuclear) defence, equipped with advanced vehicles and detection measures. RAF Regiment instructors are responsible for training all Royal Air Force personnel in basic force protection such as first aid, weapon handling and CBRN skills.

The regiment and its members are known within the RAF as "The Regiment", "Rock Apes" or "Rocks".

== History ==
=== Formation ===
The genesis of the RAF Regiment was the creation of No. 1 Armoured Car Company RAF, formed in Egypt in 1921 for operations in Iraq, followed shortly afterwards by No. 2 Armoured Car Company RAF and No. 3 Armoured Car Company RAF. These were equipped with Rolls-Royce armoured cars and carried out policing operations throughout the Middle East in the 1920s.

=== Second World War ===
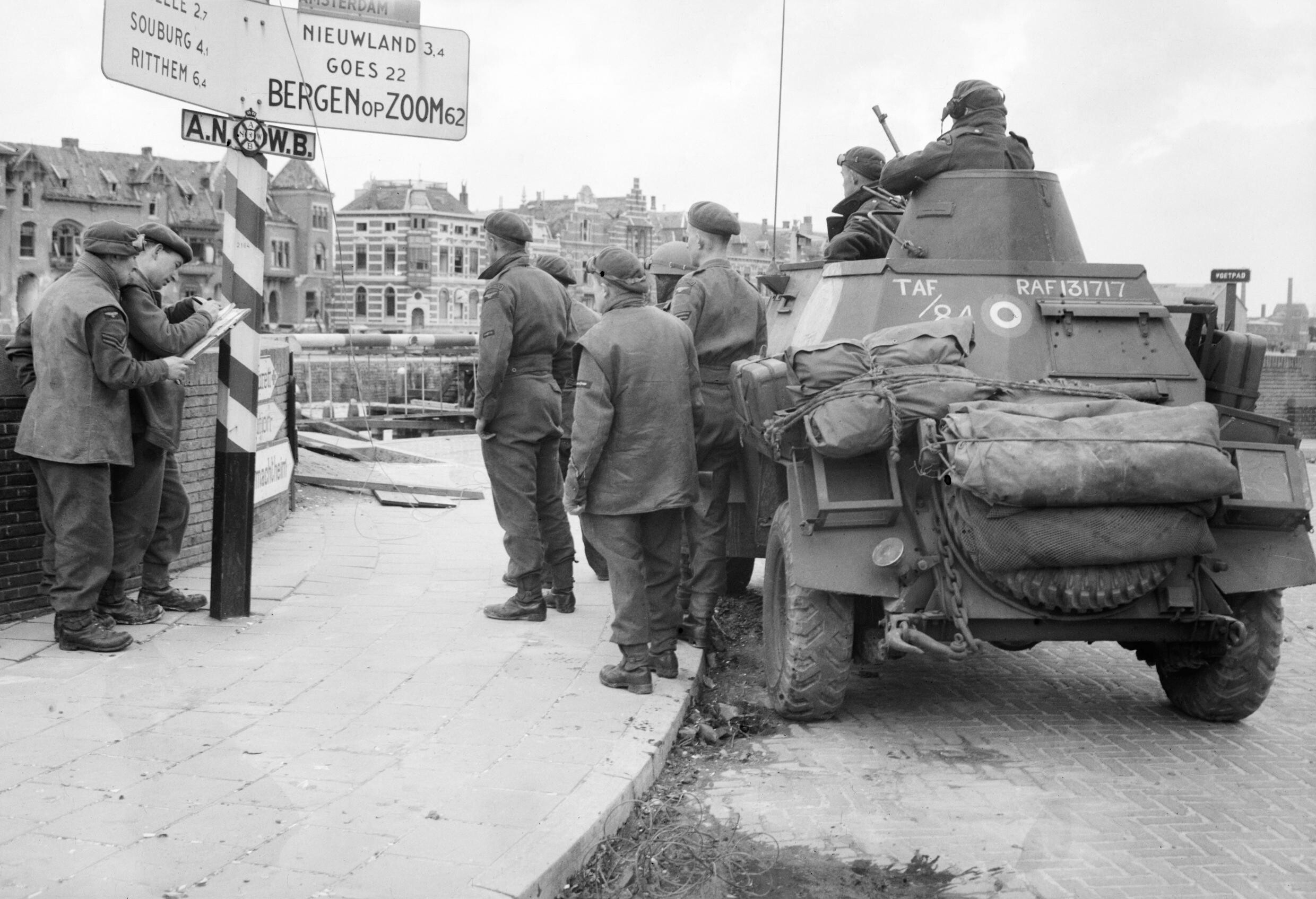
A RAF Humber LRC in Middelburg, Netherlands, during Operation Infatuate, November 1944

In 1941, during the Second World War, German airborne forces invaded Crete, then held by Greek, British and Commonwealth forces. The German invasion succeeded in major part because of the failure of the Allied land forces to recognise the strategic importance of the airfields, and hence to defend them adequately. In consequence, the RAF base at Maleme was taken largely intact by German paratroop and glider forces, albeit with heavy casualties. The Germans were then reinforced by air behind allied lines. This led eventually to the loss of the whole island and substantial Allied losses in what became known as the Battle of Crete.

Disappointed with the failure of the British Army to recognise the importance of airfields in modern warfare, Prime Minister Churchill made the RAF responsible for the defence of its own bases and the RAF Regiment was formed on 1 February 1942, with its first headquarters established at RAF Belton Park, Grantham, Lincolnshire. From the start it had 66,000 personnel drawn from the former Defence Squadrons Nos. 701–850. The new regiment was made up of field squadrons equipped with Morris Light Reconnaissance Cars, Humber Light Reconnaissance Cars and Otter Light Reconnaissance Cars.

The light anti-aircraft squadrons were originally armed with Hispano 20 mm cannon and then the Bofors 40 mm anti-aircraft gun. Its role was to seize, secure and defend airfields to enable air operations to take place. Several parachute squadrons were formed to assist in the capture of airfields, a capability retained by No. II Squadron. It mounted the King's Guard at Buckingham Palace for the first time on 1 April 1943. During the War the RAF Regiment grew to a force of over 80,000 men.

In late June 1944, with the British Army fighting in Normandy where it was sustaining heavy losses and at the same time suffering from a severe shortage of manpower, it was decided to transfer 25,000 officers and men of the RAF Regiment to the army, mostly to the infantry and the Foot Guards, to be retrained as Infantry to a level capable to conduct Army operations.

The Second World War campaign in north-eastern India and northern Burma was fought in jungle and mountains with few or non-existent roads and which facilitated the infiltration of enemy patrols behind front lines. This was overcome by holding defensive "boxes" mainly or entirely supplied by air. The defence of forward airfields close to the main army concentrations was vital to this tactic. A training school and depot for the RAF Regiment was established at Secunderabad in October 1942, to retrain former ground defence airmen. It had an assault course considered tougher than anything the army had in India. Six field squadrons and seventy AA flights were initially formed, containing 160 officers and 4,000 other ranks. Until mid-1944, the AA flights were equipped only with light machine guns, then with Hispano 20 mm cannon for the rest of the war. Regiment units defended airfields and forward mobile radar units in Arakan in the Arakan Campaign in late 1942 and early 1943.

During the Battle of Imphal, all supplies and reinforcements had to be flown in between 29 March and 22 June 1944 with RAF Regiment units providing vital airfield defence. Following the failure of the Japanese Operation U-Go, it was decided to pursue the shattered remnants of the Japanese 15th Army into Burma during the monsoon, in average rainfall of 10 in (254 mm) per day. Rifle flights were sometimes attached to advancing Indian Army and British East African units, to gain experience in the jungle.

On 1 March 1945, units of 1307 Wing were flown into the newly captured and tactically important Meiktila airfield. Only a roughly 1,076 sq yd (900 m^{2}) box, shared with the army and some United States anti-aircraft artillery, could be held at night and the airfield had to be cleared of enemy each morning before flying could start. As one of the RAF Regiment's battle honours, the three-week battle here destroyed the Japanese hold on northern Burma.

The RAF Regiment fought as field, armoured car and light anti-aircraft (LAA) squadrons and flights in North Africa, the Middle East, Italy, the Balkans and North Western Europe, as well as 68 LAA squadrons defending the UK against V1 attacks as part of Operation Diver, alongside the Royal Artillery's HAA and LAA batteries. Amongst other things, RAF Regiment units were the first British forces to reach Paris, amongst the first to enter Brussels, and Squadron Leader Mark Hobden and his force arrested Hitler's successor as Führer, Grand Admiral Karl Doenitz, at his HQ in Flensburg.

On 26 November 1944, a Me 262A-2a Sturmvogel of III/KG51 based at Hopsten/Rheine near Osnabrück was the first confirmed ground-to-air kill of a jet combat aircraft. The 262 was shot down by a 40/L60 40mm Bofors gun of B.11 Detachment of 2875 Squadron RAF Regiment, at the RAF forward airfield of Helmond, near Eindhoven. Others were lost to ground fire on 17 and 18 December, when the same airfield was attacked at intervals by a total of eighteen Me 262s. The guns of Nos. 2873 and 2875 squadrons RAF Regiment damaged several, causing at least two of them to crash within a few miles of the airfield. In February 1945, Sergeant Pollards's B.6 gun detachment of 2809 Squadron RAF Regiment shot down another Me 262 over the airfield of Volkel. The final appearance of Me 262s over Volkel was in 1945, when yet another fell to 2809's guns.

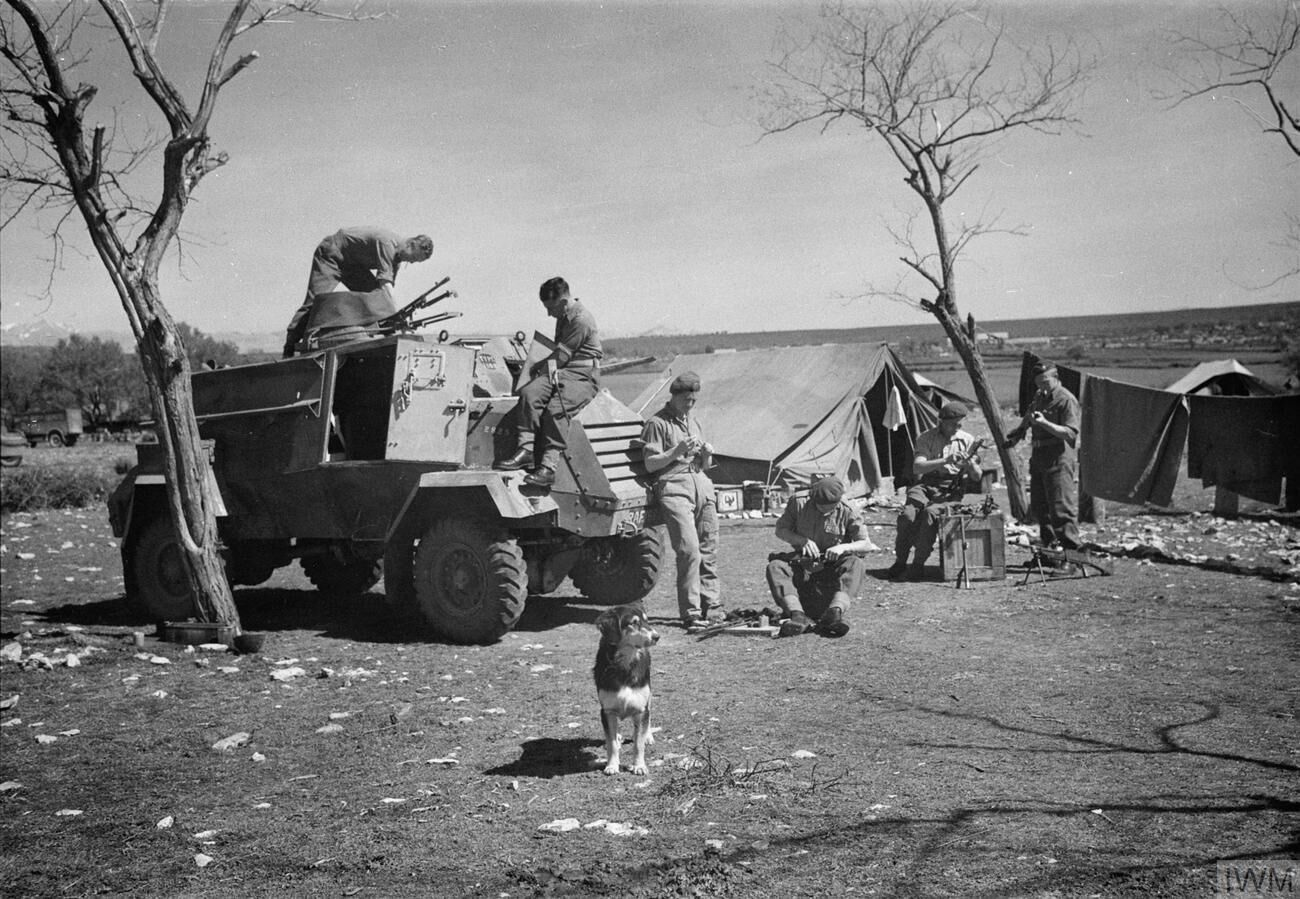
A RAF Regiment Otter vehicle at Prkos Airfield in Yugoslavia 1945

On 5 December 1944, twelve RAF Regiment squadrons deployed onto airfields in southern Greece. They became engaged in fighting with Greek Communist Forces (ELAS) which wished to depose the Greek government at that time. No. 2848 Field Squadron was the first RAF unit to arrive in West Berlin in 1945 to secure Luftwaffe Flugplatz Gatow.

=== Post-war ===
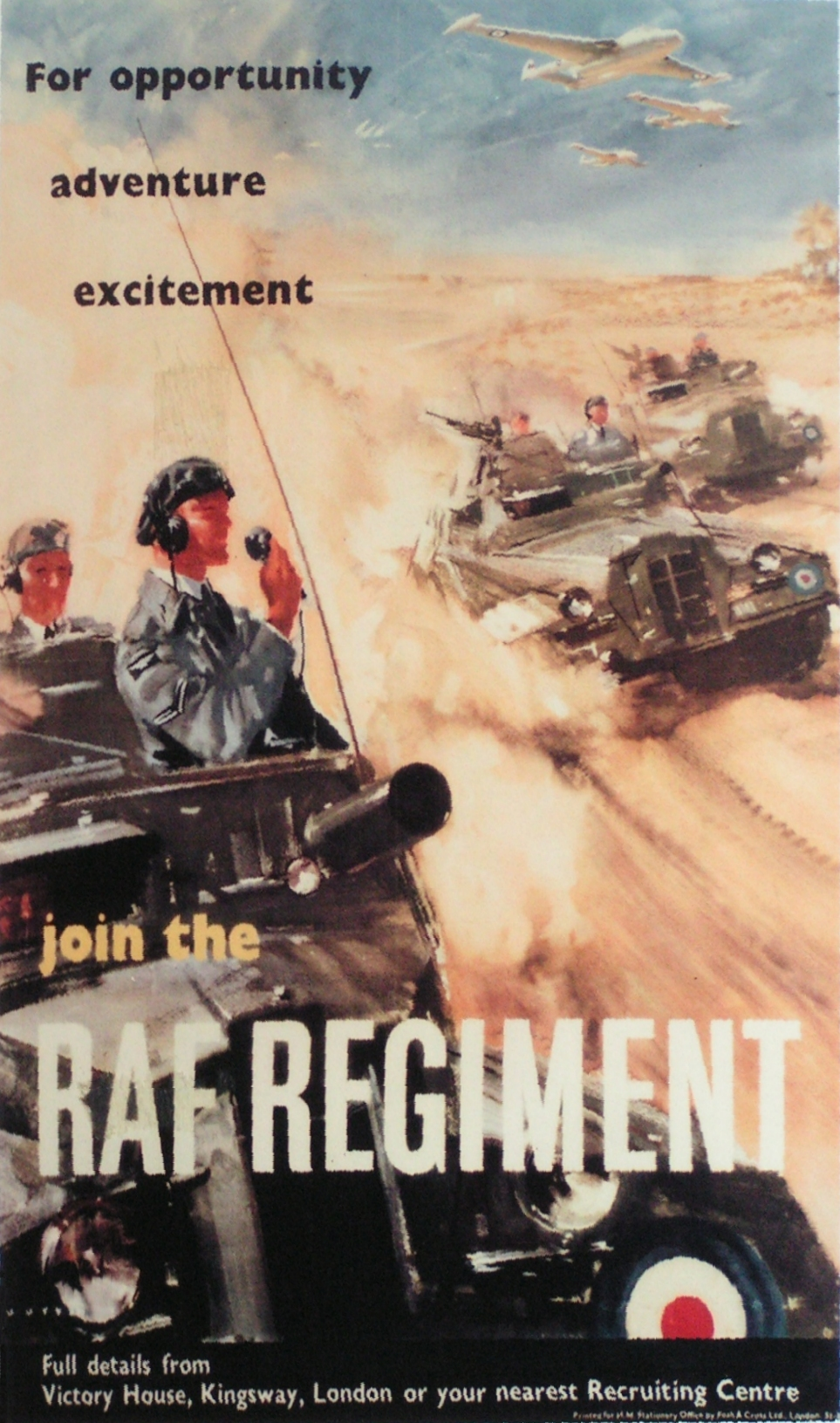
A recruiting poster in the 1950s

King George VI became Air Commodore-in-Chief of the regiment in 1947. He later decided to present his king's colour in 1952, on the 10th anniversary of the RAF Regiment's founding. The king, however, died around this time and Queen Elizabeth II instead presented the Queen's Colour a year later.

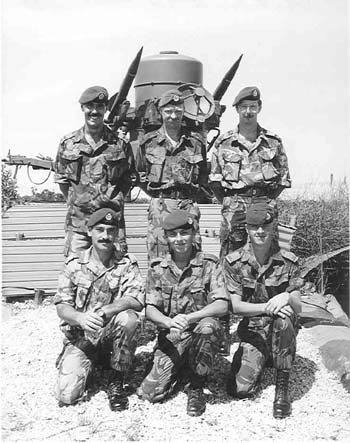
The RAF Regiment in 1988 on tour in Belize with Rapier missile system

In November 1965, the unilateral declaration of independence by Rhodesia necessitated support to Zambia, which desperately needed air defence. In a rapid response, Javelin fighters were deployed and an RAF Regiment squadron was also deployed from the United Kingdom to provide ground defence. The agility of the Regiment was demonstrated in its ability to embark 51 Squadron RAF Regiment in six hours from the call to deploy.

At the eastern end of the Empire, flights from RAF Regiment squadrons based in Singapore deployed to Hong Kong in 1968 to help maintain security and confidence. The RAF Regiment continued to be involved in Hong Kong into the mid-1970s providing protection at RAF Kai Tak and at the radar station at Tai Mo Shan.

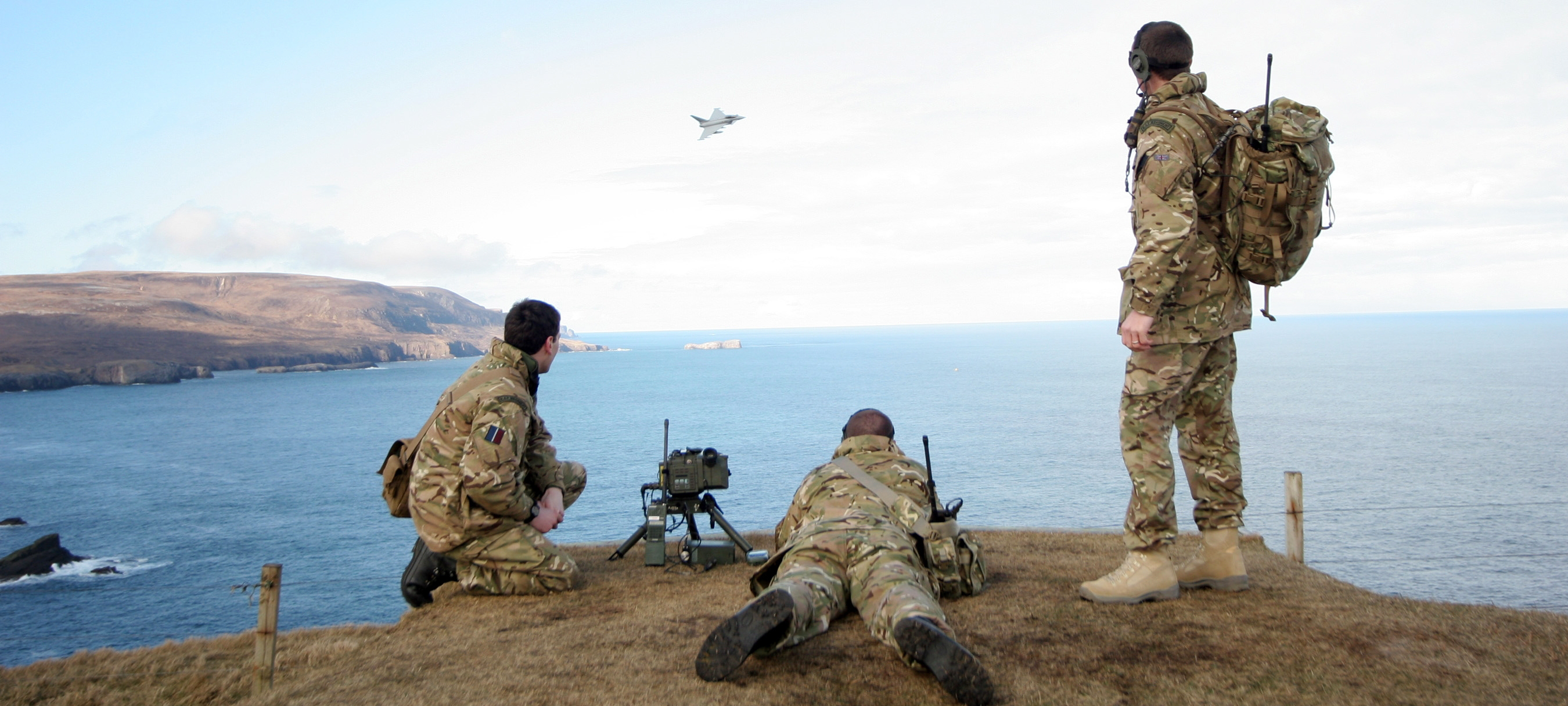
RAF Regiment Forward Air Controllers (FACs) guide a Typhoon from 6 Squadron onto their target at the Cape Wrath practice range in Scotland

In 1974, the Rapier surface-to-air missile system entered service with the RAF Regiment, and equipped four squadrons protecting four RAF airfields in Germany. Detachments from the German Rapier Squadrons, particularly from RAF Gutersloh, deployed to San Carlos beach-head during the Falklands conflict to provide anti-aircraft cover.

Light armoured squadrons, equipped with FV101 Scorpion and FV107 Scimitar light tracked vehicles, continued to be operated into the 1980s. In the 1980s, units such as 19 Squadron were equipped with Rapier and tasked with defending USAF airbases such as RAF Upper Heyford.

Four RAF Regiment personnel were killed by the IRA, all in 1988 and 1989 - one killed by hostile fire in Northern Ireland, the rest by snipers or car bombs in Europe.

In July 2004, the role of providing ground-based air defence was transferred to the British Army's Royal Artillery and the four Royal Air Force Regiment air defence squadrons were disbanded.

The RAF Regiment saw action in Iraq and Afghanistan. Leaving aside those injured, seriously or otherwise, five RAF Regiment gunners were killed in Iraq, one in a firefight, three, including a member of the RAuxAF, in a single mortar strike, and one in a road traffic incident. Five were killed in Afghanistan, one due to hostile fire, four due to IEDs, including a 51 year old member of the RAuxAF, the oldest member of the British Armed Forces to die in Afghanistan. A man died in an accident in Cyprus after leaving Afghanistan.

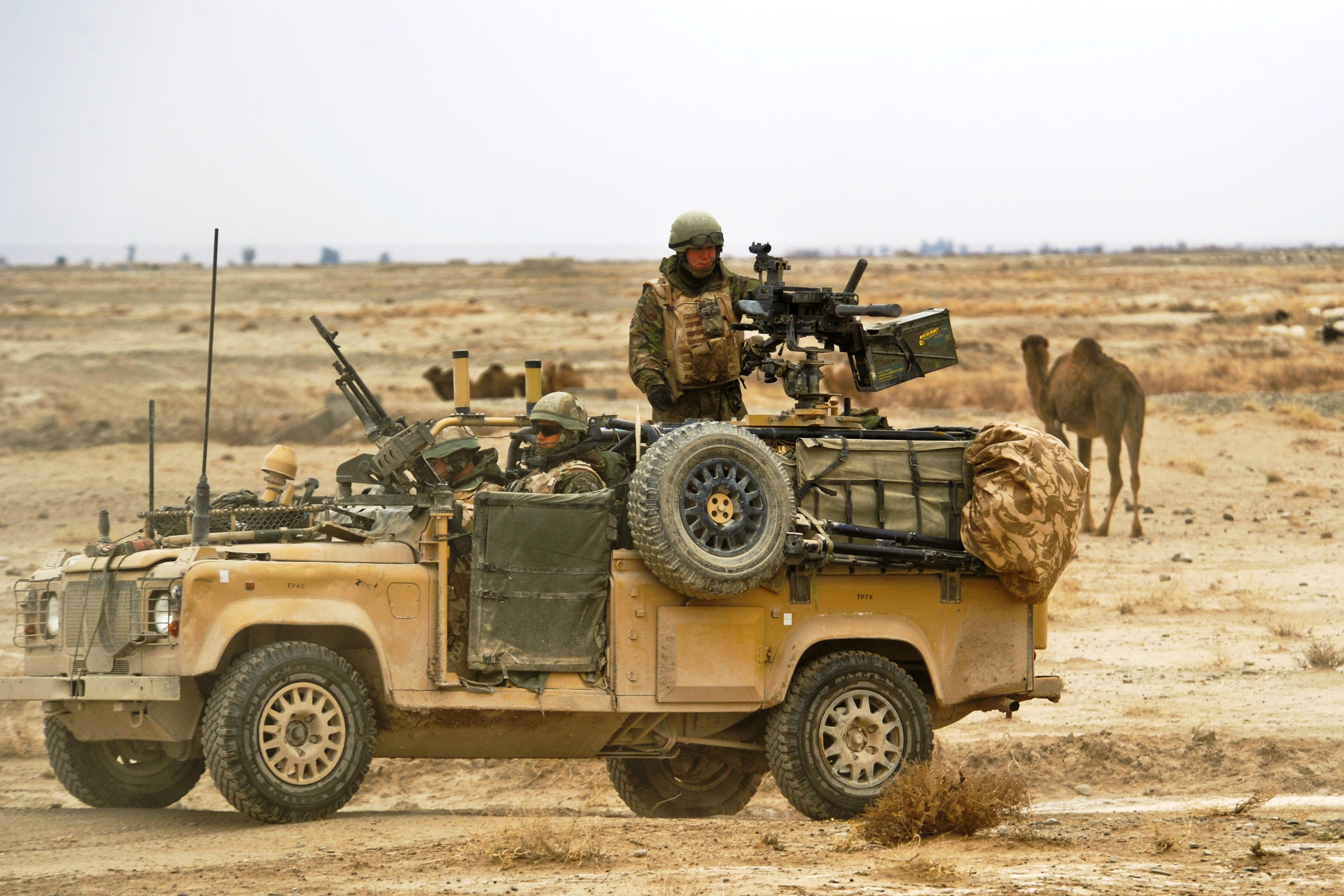
Personnel of the Royal Air Force Regiment in a Land Rover with a Weapons Mount Installation Kit ("Wimik"), stopped on a road while conducting a combat mission near Kandahar Airfield, Afghanistan, in 2010

In 2011, as part of the Strategic Defence and Security Review, it was announced that, from December 2011, the CBRN role undertaken by the Joint CBRN Regiment, a combined Army/RAF unit, would be transferred to the RAF Regiment (as lead service) under the new Defence CBRN Wing, formed from 26 Squadron, 27 Squadron and 2623 (Auxiliary) Squadron. The army retained involvement through the continued use of the Royal Yeomanry to provide trained battlefield casualty replacements.

In 2016, this decision was reversed, with the announcement that the CBRN role would be handed back to the British Army in 2020.

In November 2013, The Queen's Colour (63), 1 and 27 Squadrons had their new colours presented. 16, 37 and 48 squadrons were disbanded.

In July 2017, Prince Harry visited RAF Honington on behalf of The Queen to present a new Colour to the RAF Regiment. The new colour was to celebrate the 75th birthday of the formation of the Regiment in 1942.

== Structure in 1989 ==
The structure in 1989 was as follows:

- Commandant-General of the RAF Regiment, RAF Catterick
  - RAF Fire Service, RAF Catterick
  - No. 3 Wing RAF Regiment, RAF Catterick, administrative control of unassigned UK-based squadrons
    - No. 3 Squadron RAF Regiment, RAF Aldergrove, (Field)
    - No. 27 Squadron RAF Regiment, RAF Leuchars, (Air Defence, 8x Rapier launch stations)
    - No. 48 Squadron RAF Regiment, RAF Lossiemouth, (Air Defence, 8x Rapier launch stations)
    - No. 58 Squadron RAF Regiment, RAF Catterick, (Light Armour, 15x Spartan, 6x Scorpion)
  - No. 4 Wing RAF Regiment, RAF Wildenrath, administrative control of West Germany-based Rapier squadrons defending Royal Air Force Germany airfields
    - No. 16 Squadron RAF Regiment, RAF Wildenrath, (Air Defence, 8x Rapier launch stations)
    - No. 26 Squadron RAF Regiment, RAF Gutersloh, (Air Defence, 8x Rapier launch stations)
    - No. 37 Squadron RAF Regiment, RAF Bruggen, (Air Defence, 8x Rapier launch stations)
    - No. 63 Squadron RAF Regiment, RAF Gütersloh, (Air Defence, 8x Rapier launch stations)
  - No. 5 Wing RAF Regiment, RAF Hullavington, administrative control of field squadrons supporting the UK's Harrier Force
    - No. II Squadron RAF Regiment, RAF Hullavington, (Light Armour / Paratroopers, 15x Spartan, 6x Scorpion)
    - No. 15 Squadron RAF Regiment, RAF Hullavington, (Light Armour, 15x Spartan, 6x Scorpion)
  - No. 6 Wing RAF Regiment, RAF West Raynham, administrative control of UK-based Rapier squadrons defending US Air Force Third Air Force airfields in the UK
    - No. 19 Squadron RAF Regiment, RAF Brize Norton, (Air Defence, 12x Rapier launch stations, defending RAF Upper Heyford and RAF Fairford)
    - No. 20 Squadron RAF Regiment, RAF Honington, (Air Defence, 8x Rapier launch stations, defending RAF Alconbury, RAF Bentwaters and RAF Woodbridge)
    - No. 66 Squadron RAF Regiment, RAF West Raynham, (Air Defence, 8x Rapier launch stations, defending RAF Mildenhall and RAF Lakenheath)
  - 33 Wing, RAF Gütersloh, administrative control of West Germany-based light armour squadrons defending Royal Air Force Germany airfields
    - No. 1 Squadron RAF Regiment, RAF Laarbruch, (Light Armour, 15x Spartan, 6x Scorpion)
    - No. 34 Squadron RAF Regiment, RAF Akrotiri, Cyprus (Light Armour, 15x Spartan, 6x Scorpion)
    - No. 51 Squadron RAF Regiment, RAF Bruggen, (Light Armour, 15x Spartan, 6x Scorpion)

Additionally the Royal Auxiliary Air Force Regiment fielded the following reserve squadrons:

- No. 2503 (County of Lincoln) Squadron RAuxAF Regiment, RAF Scampton, (Field)
- No. 2620 (County of Norfolk) Squadron RAuxAF Regiment, RAF Marham, (Field)
- No. 2622 (Highland) Squadron RAuxAF Regiment, RAF Lossiemouth, (Field)
- No. 2623 (East Anglian) Squadron RAuxAF Regiment, RAF Honington, (Field)
- No. 2624 (County of Oxford) Squadron RAuxAF Regiment, RAF Brize Norton, (Field, assigned to support the Harrier Force in West Germany)
- No. 2625 (County of Cornwall) Squadron RAuxAF Regiment, RAF St Mawgan, (Field)
- No. 2729 (City of Lincoln) Squadron RAuxAF Regiment, RAF Waddington, (SHORAD)
- No. 2890 Squadron RAuxAF Regiment, RAF Waddington, (SHORAD, formed 1 October 1989)

== Organisation and role ==
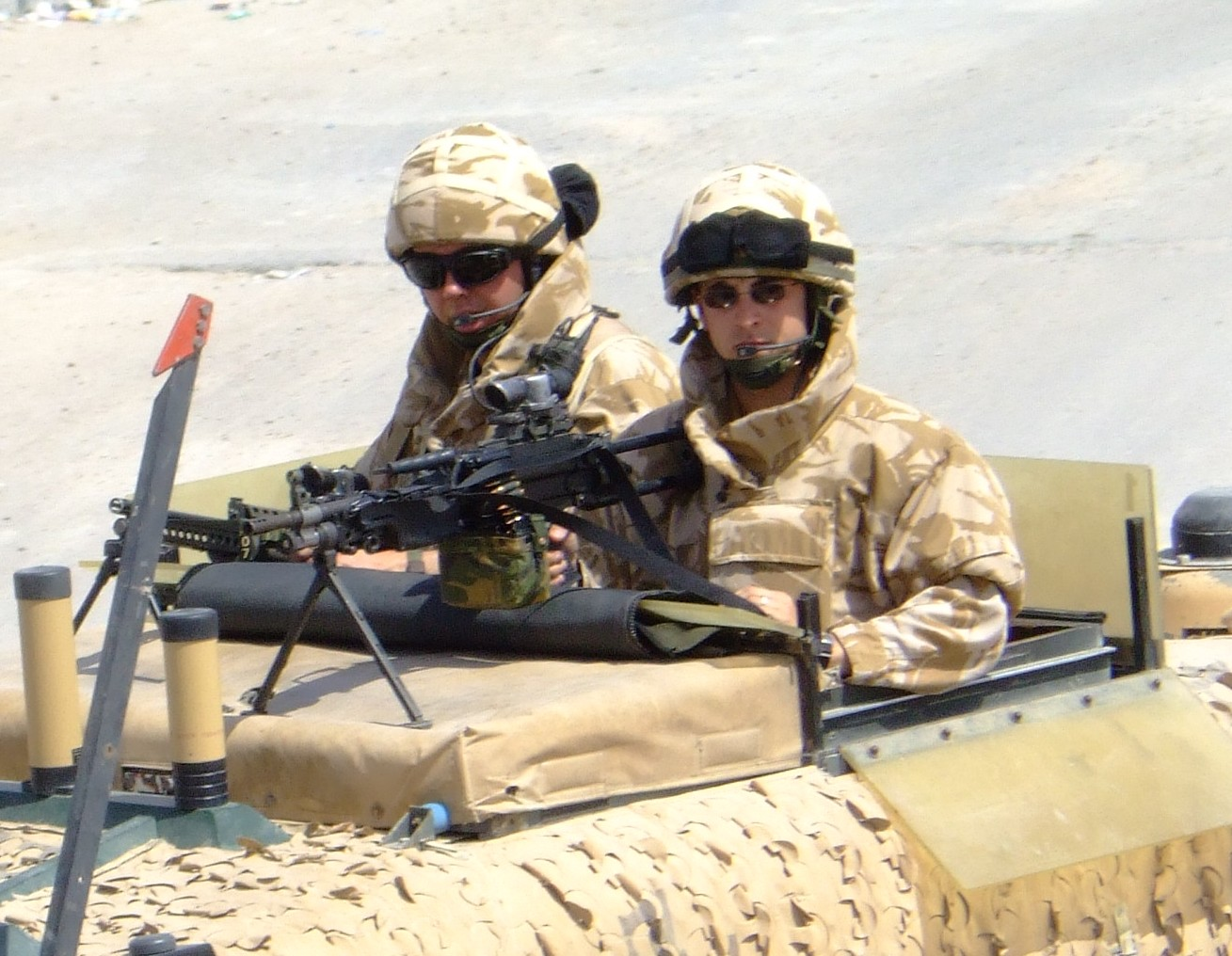
Two members of the RAF Regiment returning to Basra air station, Iraq, in May 2006

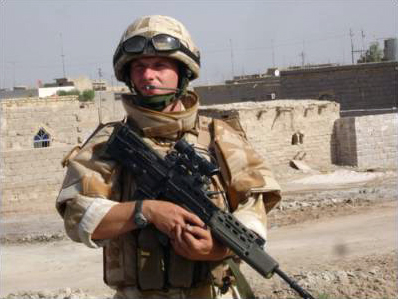
An RAF Regiment gunner in Iraq

The RAF Regiment is the RAF's organic defensive security force and comes under command of 2 Group, Air Command. Its members are organised into seven regular squadrons, - Nos 1, 2, 15, 27, 34, 51 and 63/King's Colour Squadron. Six are field squadrons. No. 27 is the specialist CBRN (Chemical, Biological, Radiological and Nuclear) units under the umbrella of the defence CBRN Wing.

The Corps carries out basic security tasks relating to the [protection of] delivery of air power. Tasks include non-combatant evacuation operation (NEO), recovery of downed aircrew (joint personnel recovery – JPR), defence of airfields by way of aggressively patrolling and actively seeking out infiltrators in a limited area surrounding airfields and within the airfield perimeter. The key tenet of the RAF Regiments role is based around defensive security operations, rather than the Army's more traditional offensive infantry role, which is to close with and kill the enemy. This requires active patrolling just outside the Airfield perimeter. The RAF Regiment provides Joint Terminal Attack Controllers (JTACs) to the British Army in the Tactical Air Control Party (TACP) role, and provides a very small (flight size) commitment in support of the Special Forces Support Group, as Tactical air controllers and some CBRN specialists.

The field squadrons are 171 strong making them larger than an infantry company in the British Army. Due to the nature of their structure and establishment for defensive security operations, they operate up to Company/Squadron level and so cannot bring the same mass to bear as a Line Infantry Regiment. Not all personnel in an RAF Regiment squadron are trained gunners but can be involved in specialist support services such as administrators and drivers. A typical RAF Regiment squadron has support elements from the RAF. These personnel do not always deploy on patrols and other combat operations.

Formerly, all RAF Regiment personnel were men, as it was British government policy that women could not serve in close combat units. The intention was that by the end of 2018, women would be allowed to apply for these roles, with the RAF recruitment website 'looking forward' to female applications for the RAF Regiment. A 2017 review determined that, although the Regiment was acknowledged to be the Royal Air Force's limited version of infantry, it was more alike to the Royal Armoured Corps in terms of risk, due to its defensive security force mission. As a result, women will be allowed into the RAF Regiment from September 2017, because the RAF Regiment was not graded at the same threat level as basic infantry. In January 2020, the first female recruit to complete the 20-week training course passed out of RAF Honington.

As of March 2021, there are approximately 1,850 regulars.

In March 2021, it was announced that the regular force is expected to be reduced by 300 personnel by 2023.

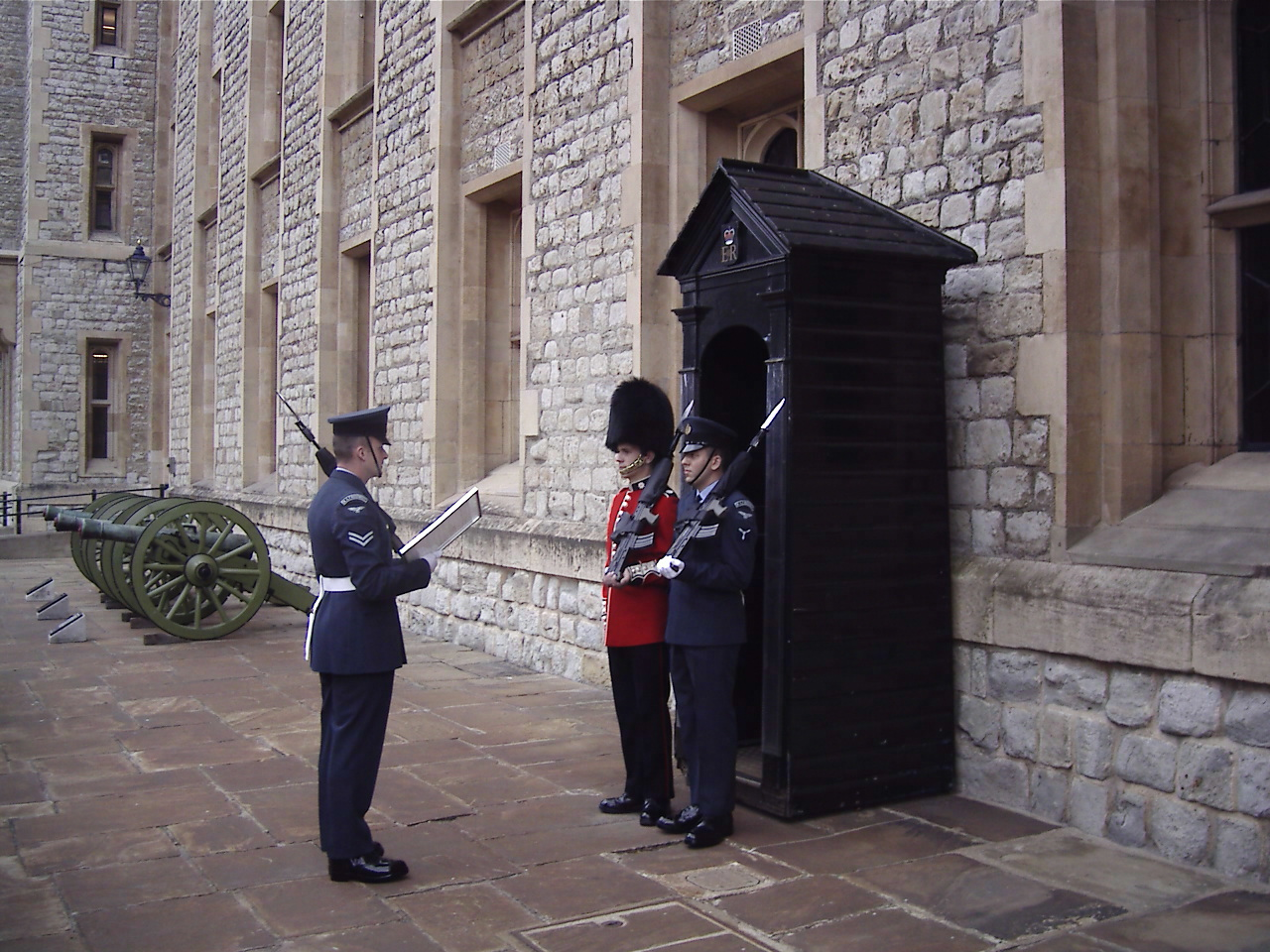
A Queen's Colour Squadron sentry relieves a Coldstream Guards sentry

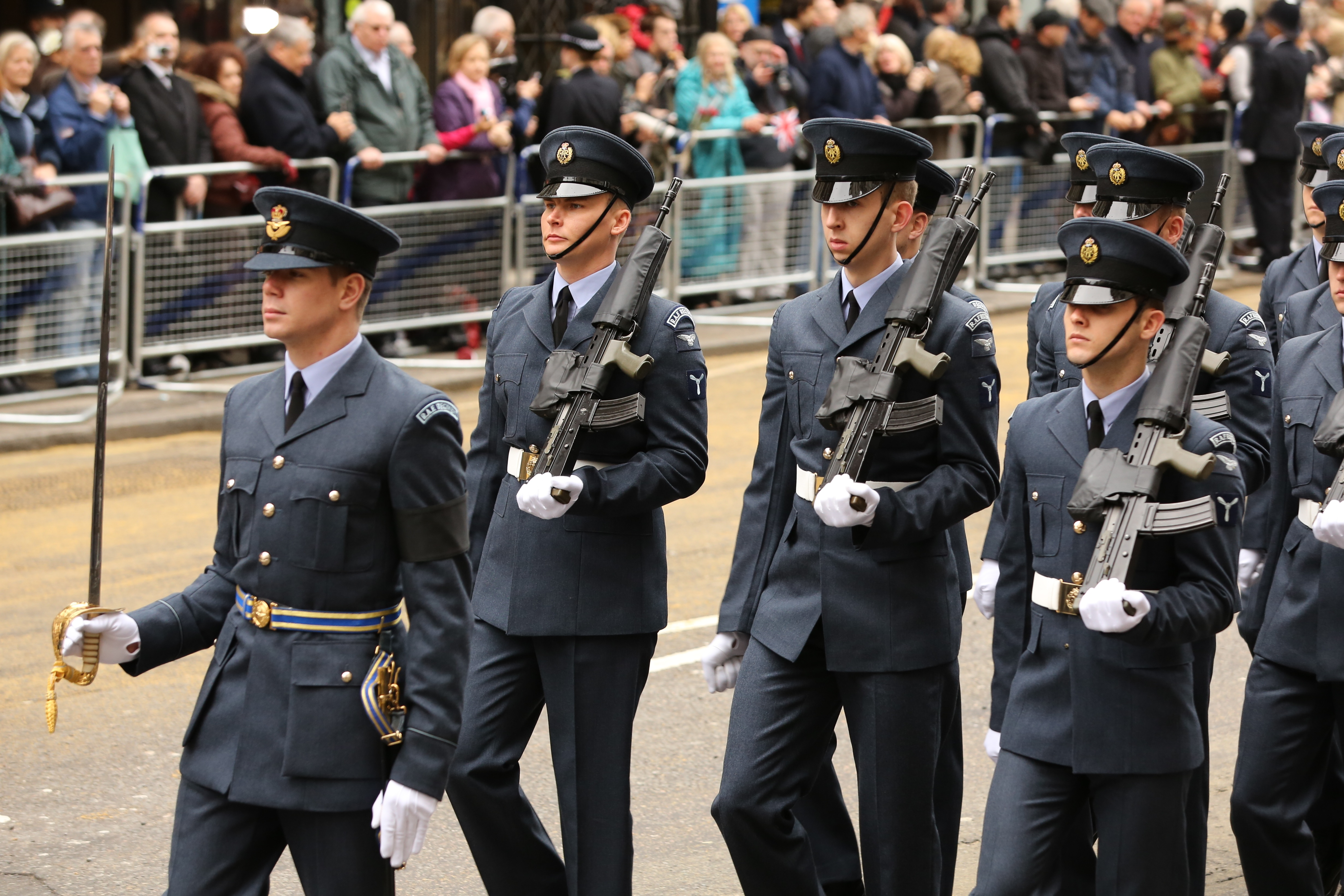
Members of the RAF Regiment on parade, 2013

=== RAF Regiment Structure ===
The current structure is as follows:

- No. 2 Counter Unmanned Aerial Systems Wing Based at RAF Leeming, North Yorkshire
  - 34 Squadron (C-UAS ) Based at RAF Leeming, North Yorkshire
  - 63 Squadron / King's Colour Squadron Based at RAF Northolt, Middlesex
  - 609 Squadron RAuxAF
- No. 3 Force Protection Wing Based at RAF Marham, Norfolk
  - 15 Squadron Based at RAF Marham, Norfolk
  - 2620 Squadron Ground Defence Based at RAF Marham, Norfolk
  - 2503 Squadron Ground Defence Based at RAF Waddington, Lincolnshire
- No. 5 Force Protection Wing Based at RAF Lossiemouth, Moray
  - 51 Squadron Based at RAF Lossiemouth, Moray
  - 603 Squadron RAuxAF Based at City of Edinburgh
  - 2622 Squadron RAuxAF Regiment Based at RAF Lossiemouth, Moray
- No. 7 Force Protection Wing Based at RAF Coningsby Lincolnshire
  - II Squadron Based at RAF Brize Norton, Oxfordshire
  - Tactical Air Traffic Control (Tac ATC) Based at RAF Brize Norton, Oxfordshire
  - 2624 Squadron RAuxAF Regiment Based at RAF Brize Norton, Oxfordshire
- No. 20 Wing RAF Regiment Based at RAF Honington, Suffolk
  - 1 Squadron Based at RAF Honington, Suffolk
  - 2623 Squadron RAuxAF Regiment Based at East Anglian
- RAF Force Protection Centre Based at RAF Honington, Suffolk
  - Knowledge Hub
  - Development Squadron
  - Air Force Protection Training Squadron
  - Air Force Protection Collective Training Squadron
- RAF Regiment Training Wing
  - Regimental Training Squadron (Basics)
  - Regimental Training Squadron (Advanced)
  - RAF Regiment Recruitment and Selection Flight (RRRSF)

== Origin of the "Rock Ape" nickname ==
In the past the nickname "Rock Ape" has been attributed to their traditional role guarding areas of Gibraltar, but this is not so. The term came into use after an accident in the Western Aden Protectorate in November 1952. Two RAF Regiment officers serving with the Aden Protectorate Levies at Dhala decided to amuse themselves by going out to shoot some of the hamadryas baboons, locally referred to as "rock apes". The officers drew rifles and split up to hunt the apes.

In the semi-darkness, one of the officers fired at a moving object in the distance. When he reached the target, he discovered he had shot the other officer. After emergency treatment Flight Lieutenant Percy Henry Mason survived to return to service a few months later. When asked by a board of inquiry why he had fired at his friend, the officer replied that his target had "looked just like a rock ape" in the half light. The remark soon reverberated around the RAF, and it was not long before the term was in general use.

== Notable former members ==
- British comedian Tony Hancock joined the RAF Regiment in 1942.
- British football manager Brian Clough served with the RAF Regiment during his National Service from 1953 to 1956.
- British actor Brian Blessed served with 2 Squadron, RAF Regiment as a parachutist during his National Service.
- British Golfer and Commentator Peter Alliss served with the RAF Regiment during his National Service from 1949 to 1951.

== See also ==
- List of RAF Regiment units
- List of equipment of the RAF Regiment
- Band of the Royal Air Force Regiment
- Aden Protectorate Levies
- Iraq Levies
- List of air force ground units
- Structure of the Royal Air Force

International:

- RAAF Airfield Defence Guards
- RNZAF Security Forces
- USAF Security Forces
