= No. 26 Squadron RAF Regiment =

Royal Air Force Regiment Squadron

No. 26 Sqn RAF Regiment
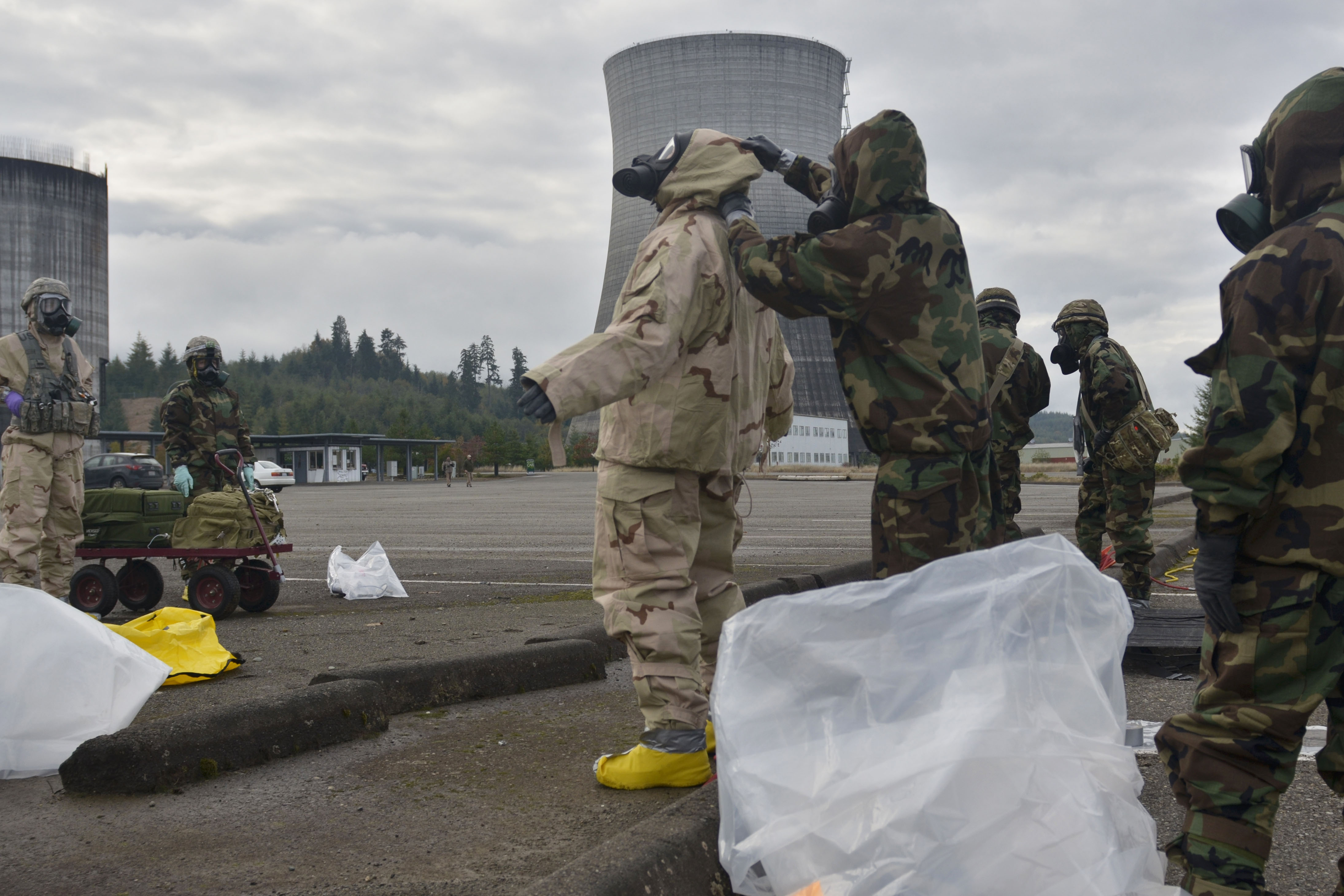
- Soldiers from the 11th Chemical Company train jointly with Airmen from No. 26 Squadron RAF Regiment in Washington State
- Active: Aug 1951–Mar 2008; May 2010–Unknown
- Disbanded: Before 2024
- Type: Air Force Infantry
- Role: Biological Warfare Detection Squadron
- Garrison/HQ: RAF Waddington 2008; RAF Honington 2010–Unknown
- Motto: "Action - Reaction"
- Battle honours: Gulf 1991; Iraq 2003–2011*; Honours marked with an asterisk* are those emblazoned on the Squadron Standard

No. 26 Squadron RAF Regiment was a squadron of the RAF Regiment between 1951 and 2008. It was reformed in 2010 as a specialist Chemical, Biological, Radiological and Nuclear (CBRN) Squadron based at RAF Honington in Suffolk, but as of November 2024, it had been disbanded.

The squadron served at locations such as RAF Abu Sueir, RAF Habbaniya, RAF Amman, RAF Tymbou, RAF Nicosia, RAF Changi, RAF Bicester, RAF Gutersloh and RAF Laarbruch. It took part in Operation's Granby and Desert Storm in 1990-91 and it was also based at RAF Waddington operating the Rapier.

== History ==
The Squadron was formed at RAF Yatesbury on 27 August 1951 and spent the next 5 years in the Middle East at Abu Sueir in Egypt, Habbaniya in Iraq and Mafrac in Jordan. In late 1956, the squadron moved to Cyprus to partake in peacekeeping duties and stayed there for 8 years before moving on to RAF Changi, Singapore.

In 1967 they returned to the UK and were stationed at RAF Bicester as an Independent LLD Squadron Armed with 40mm L/70 Bofors guns and, together with 1 Squadron RAF Regiment, they formed 5 Wing RAF Regiment.

During their posting at Bicester they went on many active detachments in a ground defence role. These included Bahrain, Antigua and Salalah. They took part in major joint services exercises in Libya and Cyprus. The operation in Antigua was classified 'Top Secret' when trouble broke out in Anguilla. They were given just 48 hours’ notice to assemble 40 men plus 8 Land Rovers and responded with a deployment in around 21 hours from scratch, despite over half the squadron being away on two other operational overseas deployments at the same time. It was only after a month or so that the operation was de-classified and wives and families could be told where they were.

In 1969 they were due to relieve a brother Squadron who were doing street patrols in Belfast. This was to happen a week before Christmas. However, in the second week of December it was announced that they were to be the first unit in the British forces to receive the Rapier Missile and were to be posted to Germany. The whole squadron moved to RAF Gutersloh in 1970, complete with l/70 Bofors and associated equipment. The planned tour in Belfast was cancelled. In 1972 they undertook a tour of duty in Northern Ireland, the bofors were still in use and deployed.

The Squadron routinely spent a great deal of time away from home, carrying out an 8-month roulement in the Falklands and being on call to defend the RAF or other UK assets throughout the world as part of the Joint Rapid Deployment Force or NATO Reaction Force (Air). The Squadron also deployed in the field role to provide Force Protection for deployed RAF Operating Bases, a role performed as part of the Coalition Forces in Iraq during Operation Telic.

In July 2004 it was announced that the role of providing Ground Based Air Defence was to be transferred to the Army and the four Royal Air Force Regiment Rapier squadrons (15 Sqn, 16 Sqn, 26 Sqn and 37 Sqn) were to be disbanded. Prior to 26 Sqn's disbandment in March 2008, there was time for one last tour of duty as the Falkland Islands Resident Rapier Sqn (RRS) in April–November 2006, during which time the last ever RAF Regiment Rapier missile practice camp (MPC) took place. The gunners then amalgamated with those of sister squadron, 15 Sqn RAF Regiment to create a field squadron. The combined squadron deployed to Afghanistan for a 6 month tour of duty in August 2007, before 26 Sqn's formal disbandment and march-off in March 2008 from RAF Waddington, its home of the previous 10 years.

== Reactivation in 2010 ==
On 24 May 2010 the existing Chemical, Biological, Radiological, Nuclear (CBRN) Operations Squadron was renumbered to 26 Squadron RAF Regiment. The squadron's role was to "deliver specialist CBRN defence capabilities at very high readiness in support of national strategic operations both in the UK and abroad." They did this by sampling and identifying CBRN materials, supporting UK explosive anti-terrorist teams and supporting UK Nuclear Accident Response teams (which includes evacuating casualties of such events) to safeguard public and military safety.

In November 2014, Prince Harry visited the squadron to present them with a new standard.
