= No. 15 Squadron RAF Regiment =

Royal Air Force Regiment Squadron

No. 15 Squadron, RAF Regiment
- Active: 1946 - 1990; Unknown - present
- Country: United Kingdom
- Branch: Royal Air Force
- Type: Air Force Infantry
- Role: Ground Defence
- Garrison/HQ: RAF Marham, Norfolk
- Mottos: Yang Pertama Di Mana Mana (Malay "To Be Reckoned With Anywhere")
- Battle honours: Gulf 1991; Former Yugoslavia Jun 95; Bosnia - Jun 97; Kuwait - Feb 99 (Op DESERT FOX); Iraq 2003 'Afghanistan 2001-2014'

Commanders
- Ceremonial chief: ACM Sir Stephen Dalton

No. 15 Squadron RAF Regiment is a field squadron of the RAF Regiment in the Royal Air Force. Its mission is protection of RAF bases from ground attack. The squadron's headquarters is at RAF Marham, having moved from RAF Honington.

== History ==
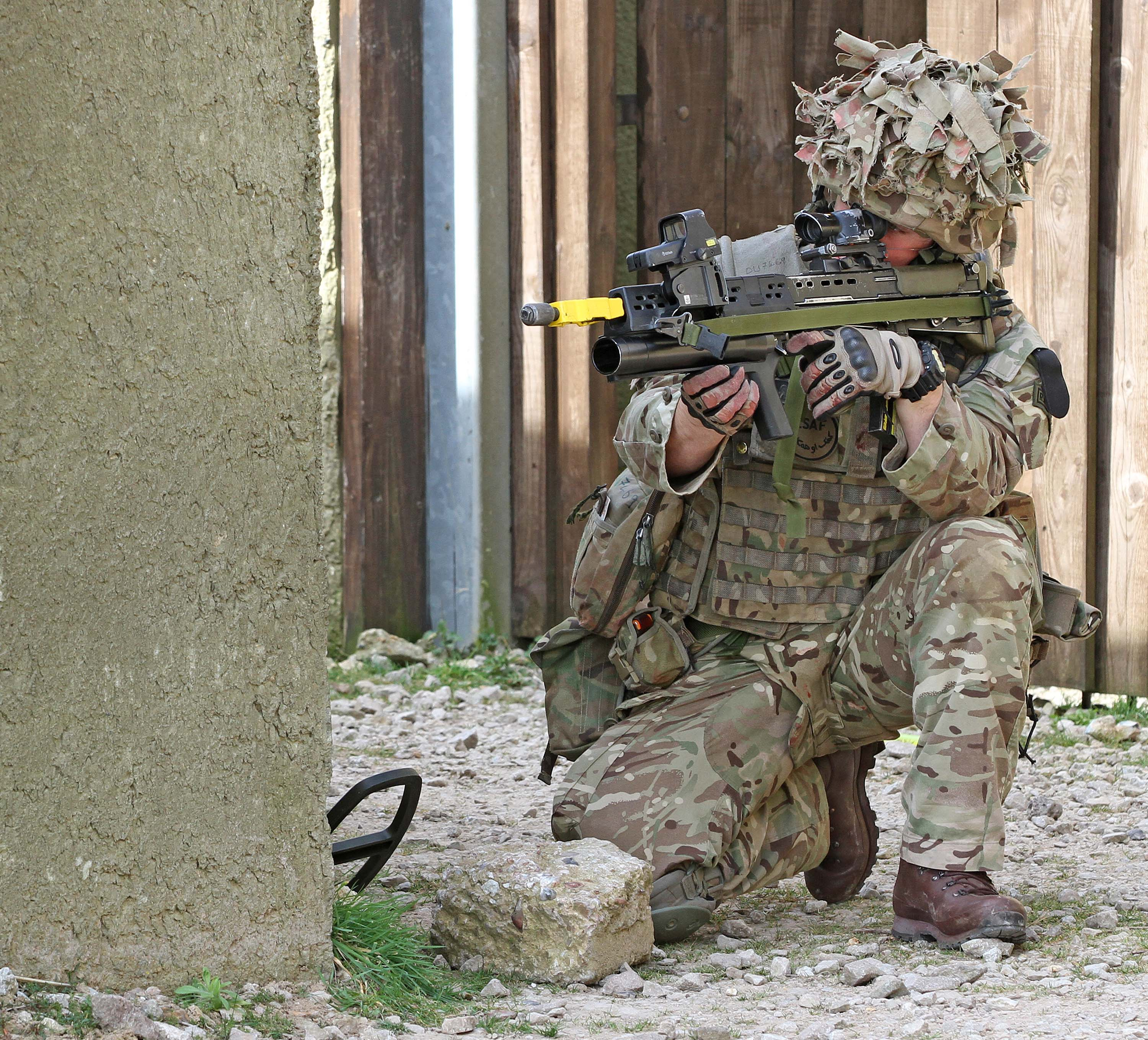
A member of 15 Squadron RAF Regiment responds to a staged attack at the Stanford Training Area (STANTA) in Norfolk during the final exercise before deploying to Afghanistan

The squadron was formed (as No. 15 Light Anti-Aircraft (LAA) Squadron) from No. 2700 LAA Squadron in June 1946 at RAF Nethertown and was renamed as No. 15 Squadron RAF Regiment a year later in June 1947. In 1957, the squadron was called upon for security and defence duties in Northern Ireland with personnel serving at RAF Aldergrove and RAF Ballykelly. From 1959 the squadron served in the Far East, helping to quell a Coup D'Etat in Brunei in 1962, and was deployed to RAF Seletar (Singapore) between 1964 and 1969. In the 1970s it was active in the Middle East, Hong Kong, Northern Ireland, Malta and Cyprus.

From 1982 until 1990, No. 15 became a light armour squadron, equipped with CVR(T) vehicles, then took an air defence role using the Rapier missile.

The squadron was disbanded during July 1990 when it was at Hullavington.

In 2003 the squadron deployed as a field squadron to Ali Al Salem airbase, Kuwait, in support of OP TELIC. On return they continued with Rapier commitments and deployed to the Falklands in 2004/2005. From 2006 the squadron had a ground defence role and served in Afghanistan and Iraq. In October 2014, the squadron provided the last troops on the ground in the airfield defence role at Camp Bastion. They withdrew back to Honington in the same month with some of the gunners on the squadron being flown out by the last wave of helicopters to leave the base, with the last of the squadron returning to the United Kingdom in November 2014.

In March 2020, the squadron was awarded the right to emblazon a battle honour on its squadron standard, recognising its role in the War in Afghanistan between 2001 and 2014.
