= King's Colour Squadron =

Regiment squadron of the Royal Air Force

The King's Colour Squadron, RAF
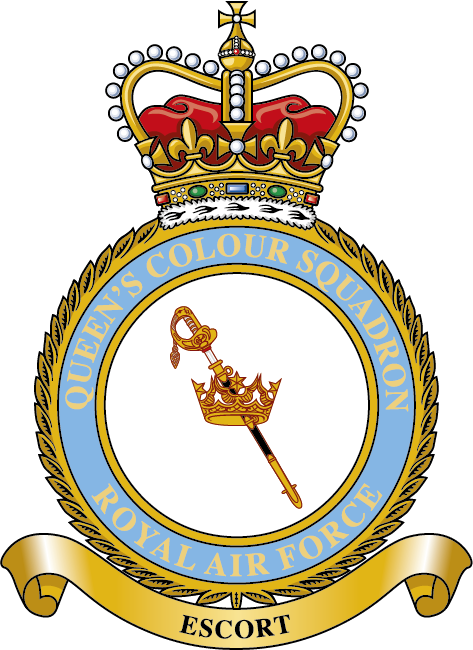
- Squadron badge (as Queen's Colour Squadron)
- Active: 1960 – present
- Country: United Kingdom
- Allegiance: United Kingdom
- Branch: Royal Air Force
- Type: Air Force Infantry
- Role: Public Duties Counter-UAS
- Size: 1 Squadron
- Part of: Combat Readiness Force
- Garrison/HQ: RAF Northolt
- Motto: Escort
- March: Regimental: Holyrood; Service: Royal Air Force March Past
- Engagements: Falklands War (As 63 Squadron)

Commanders
- Ceremonial chief: Charles III
- Notable commanders: Squadron Leader P Hutchins

The King's Colour Squadron is the unit of the Royal Air Force charged with the safe-keeping of the King's Colour for the Royal Air Force in the United Kingdom. Since its formation, it has been formed exclusively by Officers and Gunners of No. 63 Squadron RAF Regiment.

The Squadron is tasked with representing the Royal Air Force at events and ceremonies, both at home and abroad. In addition to Royal Air Force events, the Squadron has the privilege of mounting the King's Guard at Buckingham Palace, Windsor Castle and The Tower of London each year, and regularly has the honour of welcoming visiting heads of state on their arrival to the United Kingdom. The Squadron also supports State ceremonial tasks. This routinely includes providing ceremonial guards for the State Opening of Parliament, the National Service of Remembrance parade at the Cenotaph, and large UK hosted events such as the G7 Summit in Cornwall in 2021. The Squadron is also responsible for the ceremonial repatriation of serving Royal Air Force personnel from overseas and members of the Royal Family; in 1997, following the untimely death of Diana, Princess of Wales, the Squadron provided the bearer party that recovered the coffin from Paris. The Squadron provided the Bearer Party and Guard of Honour when an RAF C-17 delivered Queen Elizabeth II's coffin to London from Scotland on her death in September 2022.

== History ==
The Royal Air Force formed a ceremonial drill unit based at the Royal Air Force Depot at Uxbridge, Middlesex, in the early 1920s and first performed public duties when it mounted the King's Guard at Buckingham Palace on 1 April 1943 for King George VI. This honour was bestowed upon the Royal Air Force which, at the time, whilst eligible to mount the guard due to being a formed military unit for 25 years, were ineligible due to not being an infantry unit. This led to the Royal Air Force Regiment, despite being only created by Royal Warrant a year prior, mounting the King's Guard on behalf of the Royal Air Force, a duty which it has carried out every year since.

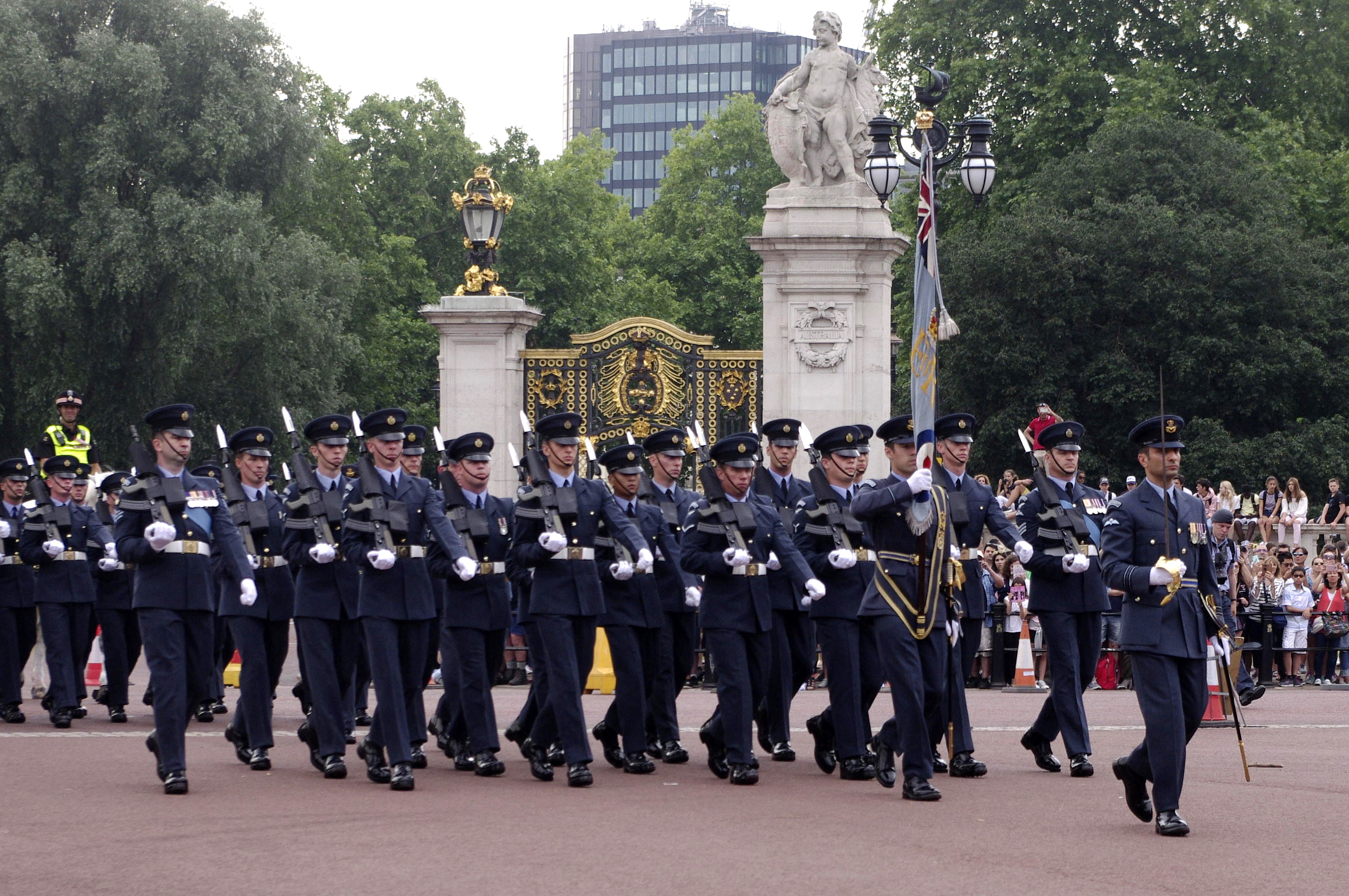
QCS at the Changing of the Guard

In 1960, the RAF Drill Unit was charged with the task of guarding and escorting the Queen's Colour for the Royal Air Force in the United Kingdom, and was renamed the Queen's Colour Squadron. It was a pure ceremonial unit for 30 years, providing the sole escort to the Colour, and famed for its displays of continuity drill, which are performed without a single word of command. The most notable displays include the Royal British Legion's Festival of Remembrance and Royal Edinburgh Military Tattoo. More recently, Hong Kong, also the Squadron was privileged to take part in the RAF Regiment's 80th anniversary parade held at Buckingham Palace. This saw all Squadrons of the RAF Regiment parading their Standards on the forecourt of the palace, during a unique Changing of the Guard ceremony consisting of the Old and New Guard being formed entirely of Queen's Colour Squadron personnel, all under the watchful eye of The Duke of Kent.

The 1990 Options for Change defence reforms led to the Squadron being given an operational role as a field Squadron in addition to its ceremonial role. For this, it was given the 'number plate' of No 63 Squadron, being renamed The Queen's Colour Squadron RAF 63 Squadron RAF Regiment. Alongside members of the ship's company from HMS Illustrious, and those of the Black Watch, 12 serving members of the QCS were the last military presence in Hong Kong before it was handed back in 1997. Also in 1997, eight members of the squadron were provided to be coffin-bearers at RAF Northolt on the repatriation of Diana, Princess of Wales, after her death in Paris.

The Squadron provided the Bearer Party and Guard of Honour when an RAF plane delivered Queen Elizabeth II's coffin to RAF Northolt at London from Scotland following her death in September 2022.

Following the accession of King Charles III, The Queen's Colour Squadron became the custodians of The King's Colour for the Royal Air Force in the United Kingdom, the squadron name was changed to King's Colour Squadron on 27 October 2022.

== See also ==
- King's Guard
- United States Air Force Honor Guard
- Band of the Royal Air Force Regiment
- RAF Regiment
- Royal Air Force
