= John Quinton =

British Royal Air Force officer (1921–1951)

John Alan Quinton GC DFC
- Born: John Alan Quinton; 2 February 1921; Brockley, London, England
- Died: 13 August 1951 (aged 30); Hudswell, North Yorkshire
- Burial place: St John the Baptist, Leeming, England
- Military career
- Allegiance: United Kingdom
- Branch: Royal Air Force
- Service years: 1941–1946, 1951
- Rank: Flight Lieutenant
- Service number: 11571
- Conflicts: World War II
- Awards: George Cross; Distinguished Flying Cross

Flight Lieutenant John Alan Quinton, GC, DFC (2 February 1921 – 13 August 1951) was a British navigator and pilot who was posthumously awarded the George Cross for an act of outstanding bravery where he unselfishly saved a young air cadet whilst losing his own life after the aircraft he was in was involved in a mid-air collision over Yorkshire.

On 13 August 1951, Flight Lieutenant Quinton was a navigator with 228 Operational Conversion Unit, RAF Leeming, under instruction in a Wellington aircraft which was involved in a mid-air collision. An Air Training Corps cadet, 16-year-old Derek Coates, was with him in the rear compartment of the aircraft when the force of the impact caused the Wellington to break up and plunge to the ground out of control.

Flight Lieutenant Quinton picked up the only parachute he could see, clipped it on to the cadet's harness, showed him how to pull the rip-cord and ordered him to jump. The cadet landed safely and was the only survivor of the disaster; all eight other occupants of the two aircraft perished.

For his selfless action he was awarded the George Cross (GC), the UK's highest award for bravery where the award of the Victoria Cross (VC) is not applicable, such as acts of gallantry by a civilian, or by a military person who is not in the presence of the enemy. The George Cross is equal in status to the Victoria Cross, but as the newer award, in order of wear, the George Cross is second to the Victoria Cross.

== Citation ==
GC, DFC & campaign medals

Date of Gazette: 23 October 1951

The KING has been graciously pleased to approve the posthumous award of the GEORGE CROSS to Flight-Lieutenant John Alan Quinton, D.F.C. (11571), Royal Air Force, No. 228 Operational Conversion Unit. On August the 13th, 1951, Flight-Lieutenant Quinton was a Navigator under instruction in a Vickers Wellington aircraft which was involved in a mid-air collision. The sole survivor from the crash was an Air Training Corps Cadet who was a passenger in the aircraft, and he has established the fact that his life was saved by a supreme act of gallantry displayed by Flight-Lieutenant Quinton, who in consequence sacrificed his own life. Both Flight-Lieutenant Quinton and the Cadet were in the rear compartment of the aircraft when the collision occurred. The force of the impact caused the aircraft to break up and, as it was plunging towards the earth out of control, Flight-Lieutenant Quinton picked up the only parachute within reach and clipped it on to the Cadet's harness. He pointed to the rip-cord and a gaping hole in the aircraft, thereby indicating that the Cadet should jump. At that moment a further portion of the aircraft was torn away and the Cadet was flung through the side of the aircraft clutching his rip-cord, which he subsequently pulled and landed safely. Flight-Lieutenant Quinton acted with superhuman speed displaying the most commendable courage and self-sacrifice, as he well knew that in giving up the only parachute within reach he was forfeiting any chance of saving his own life. Such an act of heroism and humanity ranks with the very highest traditions of the Royal Air Force, besides establishing him as a very gallant and courageous officer, who, by his action, displayed the most conspicuous heroism.

== Life history ==
John Quinton was born in Brockley, near Lewisham, south east London in 1921 and was educated at Christ's College, Finchley leaving in 1937 having passed the London General School Examination with Matriculation.

He joined the Specialloids engineering company as an apprentice. He could have remained there as an exempt employee through the war, but in 1941 he chose to join the Royal Air Force as a navigator. He flew in night fighters, consistently earning exceptional ratings, and was commissioned in January 1942. For this work, he was awarded the Distinguished Flying Cross (DFC) in 1944 flying Mosquitos with No. 604 Squadron. After he was promoted to Squadron Leader, he served in India and the Pacific theatre of the war. He became a flight commander, which was unusual for a navigator.

In 1946 he left the RAF and went back to his old job at Specialloids, and then moved to the car accessory company Brown Brothers where he remained until 1951. During this time he married and became a father to a son.

In 1951 he re-joined the RAF at the 228 Operational Conversion Unit where he had to start again as a Flight Lieutenant as he was unable to return with his old rank of Squadron Leader. He was killed only two months later on the point of completing his refresher course.

The George Cross was presented to his widow, Margaret Quinton, by HM The Queen at an investiture held on 27 February 1952, the first of her reign.

His medals are currently on display in the Lord Ashcroft Gallery at the Imperial War Museum in London.

== Scouting ==
John Quinton was a keen Boy Scout and joined the 186 North London Scout Troop that met in the Church Hall of the Whetstone Congregational Church. He rapidly became a Patrol Leader and attended camps at Gilwell Park, Essex, as well as the World Scout Jamboree in the Netherlands in 1937. In 1938 he was chosen to lead the troop camp in Kandersteg, Switzerland. He then moved up to become a Rover Scout and was awarded the King's Scout badge. During the war his father, Charles, took on the Rover Scout leadership of the group and his mother, Kate, was also heavily involved with the families of the troop with one or more members on active service; his two brothers Ken and Mike were also members of the troop. After the end of the war John went back to Scouting and the 186 Troop, ending up as their Group Scout Master. The story of his death was subsequently published in an article in the 1962 Scout Annual entitled "He Lived – and Died – by the Scout Law" which was written by Leslie Hunt who had served with him during the war.

Coat of Arms

== Memorials ==
He is buried in the grounds of St John the Baptist's Church, Leeming, Yorkshire.

The Quinton Memorial Trophy is a commemorative Baton which all Air Training Corps (ATC) members contributed to as a memorial to his bravery. This was originally awarded annually at RAF Halton to the highest achieving former ATC cadet in each graduating class of apprentices of No. 1 School of Technical Training. In 1993, No 1 SoTT moved to RAF Cosford and the trophy is now held at RAF Cranwell and is awarded annually to the ATC SNCO who, on completion of the Senior NCO Staff Initial Course, attains the highest overall marks in all examinable subjects. A small replica of the baton was presented to Margaret Quinton and their son Roger on behalf of the Air Training Corps.

There is a memorial in Whetstone United Reformed (ex Congregational) Church referencing the Boy Scouts.

The Coat-of-Arms was granted by the College of Arms with the assistance of John Brooke-Little CVO FSA Norroy and Ulster King of Arms. The design shows an eagle owl (symbolising the Night Fighters) clutching a twin-headed serpent (symbolising the two enemies Germany and Japan) above a background of night and day. The winged amulet symbolises a navigator and the fleur-de-lis represent the Boy Scouts. The Motto – 'Animo et Fide' (Courage and Faith) – was chosen by his eldest grandson, Jason Quinton, as being appropriate for his grandfather.

RAF Leeming had a special room constructed in his memory in the old control tower. Later this was demolished and a separate room was established in the main buildings. On the 60th anniversary of the accident, on 13 August 2011, a new accommodation block was named the Quinton Block in his memory.

Also on the 60th anniversary a plaque was unveiled in Hudswell, North Yorkshire near the actual crash site. The memorial commemorates the seven airman and one cadet who died in the crash as well as the story of the single cadet who survived.

1869 (Middlesbrough) Squadron ATC Headquarters building. An opening ceremony was performed on 15 September 2007 by Roger Quinton naming their new Headquarters 'The Quinton GC Building' in his Father's memory.

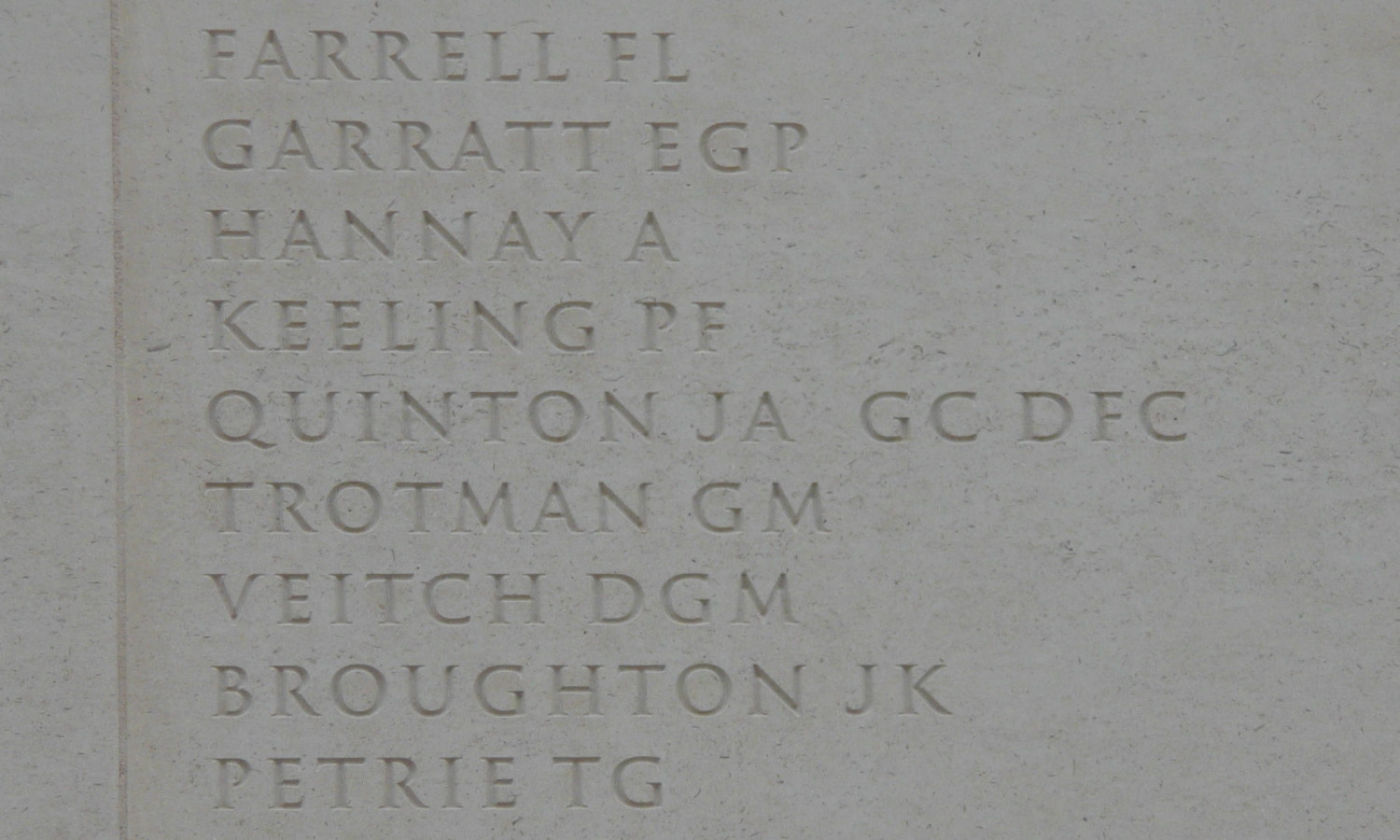
J.A. Quinton listed on the Armed Forces Memorial at the National Memorial Arboretum

His name is included on the Armed Forces Memorial located at the National Memorial Arboretum in Staffordshire which was dedicated by Queen Elizabeth on 12 October 2007. His details are included on the Rolls of Honour that are kept on public display in the Church of St Clement Danes in London. His name is also inscribed on a plaque near the altar listing the names of RAF and RFC personnel awarded the George Cross.

1869 (Middlesbrough) Squadron ATC Headquarters
