= Leeming, North Yorkshire =

Village in North Yorkshire, England

Coordinates: 54.298771°N 1.548939°W

Leeming
- Location within North Yorkshire
- Population: 2,788 (2011 census)
- Civil parish: Exelby, Leeming and Londonderry
- Unitary authority: North Yorkshire
- Ceremonial county: North Yorkshire
- Region: Yorkshire and the Humber
- Country: England
- Sovereign state: United Kingdom
- Post town: NORTHALLERTON
- Postcode district: DL7
- Police: North Yorkshire
- Fire: North Yorkshire
- Ambulance: Yorkshire

Leeming is a village in North Yorkshire, England.

== Geography ==
Leeming lies a mile east of the current A1(M) road, south of the larger village of Leeming Bar and north of the small hamlet of Londonderry. Nearby is the RAF base of RAF Leeming. Before the opening of the 3-mile (4.8 km) £1 million bypass in October 1961, the A1 passed through the village following the path of Dere Street, parallel and close to the main runway of the airfield.

=== Climate ===
Climate data for Leeming (North Yorkshire): Average maximum and minimum temperatures, and average rainfall recorded between 1991 and 2020 by the Met Office.elevation: 32 m (105 ft)
Month	Jan	Feb	Mar	Apr	May	Jun	Jul	Aug	Sep	Oct	Nov	Dec	Year
Mean daily maximum °C (°F)	7.0 (44.6)	7.8 (46.0)	10.2 (50.4)	13.0 (55.4)	16.0 (60.8)	18.7 (65.7)	21.0 (69.8)	20.5 (68.9)	17.9 (64.2)	13.9 (57.0)	9.9 (49.8)	7.2 (45.0)	13.6 (56.5)
Mean daily minimum °C (°F)	1.1 (34.0)	1.1 (34.0)	2.2 (36.0)	3.9 (39.0)	6.5 (43.7)	9.6 (49.3)	11.6 (52.9)	11.4 (52.5)	9.3 (48.7)	6.5 (43.7)	3.4 (38.1)	1.0 (33.8)	5.65 (42.17)
Average precipitation mm (inches)	53.8 (2.12)	44.0 (1.73)	39.4 (1.55)	46.2 (1.82)	43.8 (1.72)	58.8 (2.31)	56.2 (2.21)	65.3 (2.57)	56.9 (2.24)	65.0 (2.56)	64.8 (2.55)	59.5 (2.34)	653.7 (25.74)
Average precipitation days (≥ 1.0 mm)	12.0	10.0	8.5	9.0	8.7	9.4	9.3	10.1	9.1	11.1	12.2	11.9	121.4
Mean monthly sunshine hours	58.1	81.7	121.5	153.8	195.0	175.9	185.5	171.2	132.7	93.4	63.7	54.2	1,486.7
Source: Met Office

== History ==
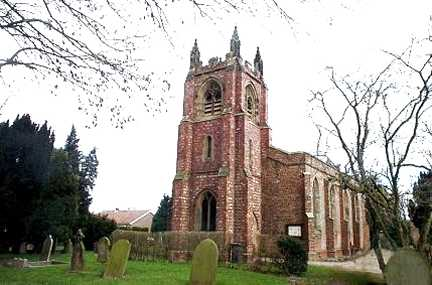
St John the Baptist's Church, Leeming

The name derives from the river-name, which turned settlement-name. The etymology may be linked with British *lemanio "elm-tree", but there are other possibilities. An archaeological survey undertaken on Kelsall Villa (a Roman site near to Leeming Bar) describes it as deriving from the river with Leming meaning bright stream.

In April 2008, the nearby base's remaining Tornado F3 squadron (25 Sqn) was disbanded. The base has been redeveloped as a communications station with the formation of No. 90 Signals Unit, the first elements of which began arriving in 2006. Three flying squadrons remain at the base, 11 Squadron (Qatar), Northumbrian Universities Air Squadron and the Yorkshire Universities Air Squadron.

The village churchyard is the burial place of Flt Lt John Quinton GC DFC, who sacrificed himself to save an air cadet by providing the cadet with the only available parachute after a mid-air collision.

== Governance ==
An electoral ward in the same name exists. This ward stretches south to Carthorpe with a total population of 3,500. From 1974 to 2023 it was part of the Hambleton District, it is now administered by the unitary North Yorkshire Council.

== Biogas plant ==
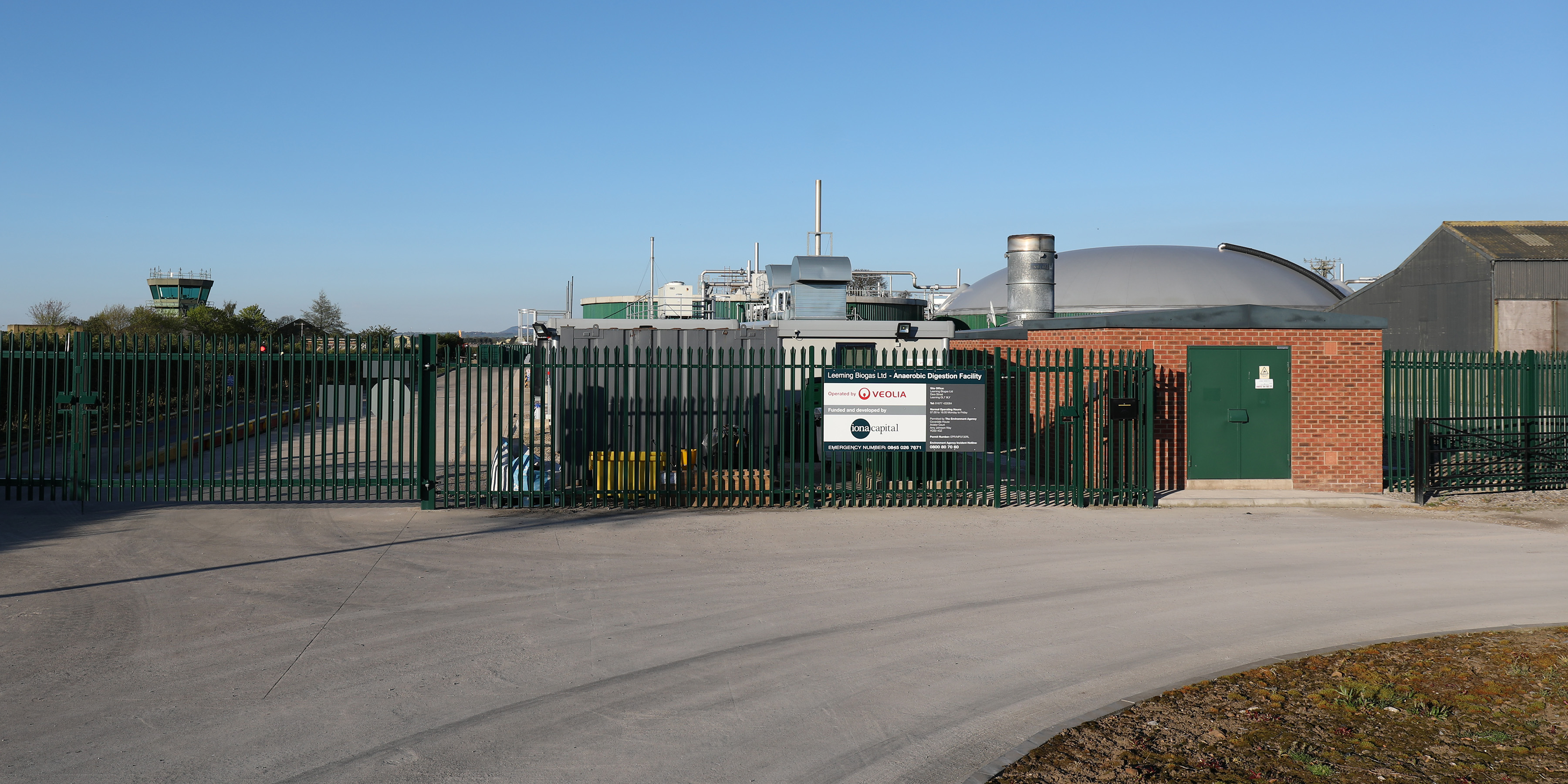
Leeming Biogas Plant at Leeming village in North Yorkshire

In July 2016, an £18 million biogas plant was opened at the southern end of the village adjacent to RAF Leeming. The Clapham Lodge facility takes in 80,000 tonnes (88,000 tons) of food waste annually from local farms and food manufacturers and produces biogas (biomethane) and fertiliser from its anaerobic digestion (AD) plant. The plant generates approximately 7,000,000 cubic metres (250,000,000 cu ft) of biogas per year which is fed directly into the Northern Gas Network pipeline and is enough to power almost 4,800 homes. The fertiliser is then sold off to local farms.

Local firms such as R & R foods (based at Leeming Bar) and Wensleydale Creamery in Hawes both supply waste product for use in the biogas plant. Wensleydale Creamery, famous for producing Wensleydale cheese, signed a contract in 2019 for the biogas plant to take on the whey by-product from their cheesemaking. This will add an additional 1,000,000 cubic metres (35,000,000 cu ft) of green gas to the plants' output every year, which is enough to power 800 homes.

== See also ==
- Listed buildings in Exelby, Leeming and Londonderry
