= Exelby, Leeming and Londonderry =

Civil parish in North Yorkshire, England

Coordinates: 54.278°N 1.549°W

- Civil parish
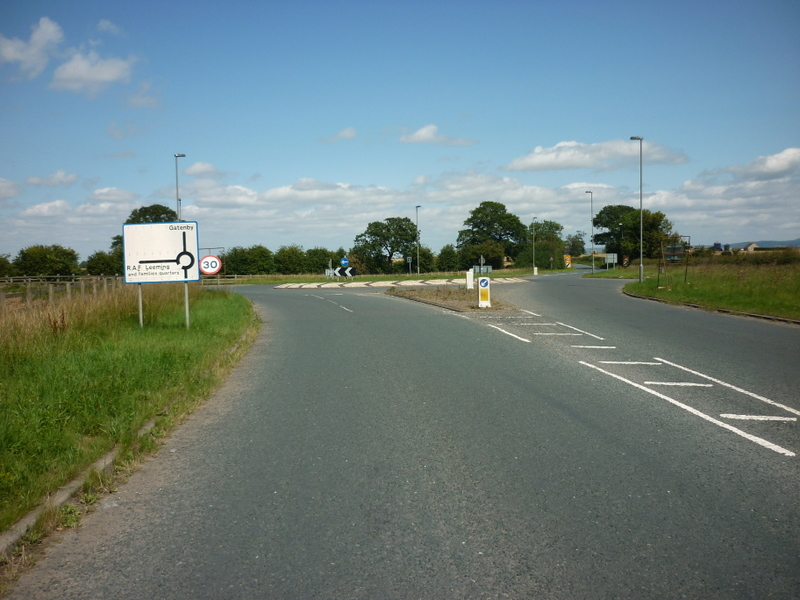
- Turn left for Leeming; straight ahead for Gatenby

- Population: 2,788 (including Gatenby 2011 census)
- OS grid reference: SE294870
- Civil parish: Exelby, Leeming and Londonderry
- Unitary authority: North Yorkshire
- Ceremonial county: North Yorkshire
- Region: Yorkshire and the Humber
- Country: England
- Sovereign state: United Kingdom
- Post town: BEDALE
- Postcode district: DL8
- Post town: NORTHALLERTON
- Postcode district: DL7
- Dialling code: 01677
- Police: North Yorkshire
- Fire: North Yorkshire
- Ambulance: Yorkshire
- UK Parliament: Thirsk and Malton

Exelby, Leeming and Londonderry (formerly Exelby, Leeming and Newton) is a civil parish in the county of North Yorkshire, England. It contains three villages – Exelby, Leeming and Londonderry – and RAF Leeming Royal Air Force station. The population of the civil parish as of the 2011 census was 2,788. The parish was renamed because it was felt that "Newton" was not recognised while Londonderry was, being a hamlet.

From 1974 to 2023 it was part of the Hambleton District, it is now administered by the unitary North Yorkshire Council.

== See also ==
- Listed buildings in Exelby, Leeming and Londonderry
