= Hudswell =

Hudswell may refer to:

- Hudswell, North Yorkshire, England
- Hudswell, Wiltshire, England
