= RAF Spadeadam =

Royal Air Force station in Cumbria, England

RAF Spadeadam
- Near Gilsland, Northumberland in England
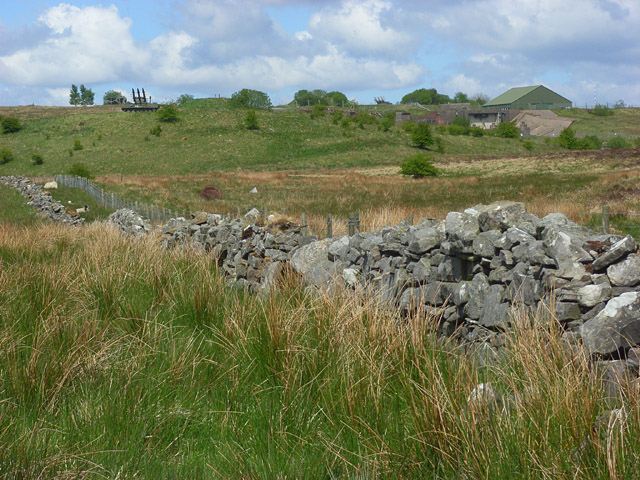
- RAF Spadeadam

- 'Si vis pacem para bellum'" (If you seek peace, prepare for war)

Site information
- Type: Royal Air Force station
- Owner: Ministry of Defence
- Operator: Royal Air Force

Location
- Location in Cumbria, England Location in former Carlisle district, Cumbria
- Coordinates: 55°01′30″N 002°36′08″W
- Area: 7,820 acres (3,165 ha)

Site history
- Built: 1955
- In use: 1957 – present

Garrison information
- Current commander: Wing Commander Matthew Lawrence BSc MA RAF

RAF Spadeadam (pronounced "Spade Adam") (IATA: N/A, ICAO: EGOM) is a Royal Air Force station in Cumbria, England, close to the border with Northumberland. It is the home of the 9,000 acre (36 km^{2}) electronic warfare (EW) tactics range, making it the largest (by area) RAF base in the United Kingdom. Its primary use is for EW training to the RAF and NATO allies. The site and course of Hadrian's Wall runs a few miles south of the range.

== Spadeadam ==
The Spadeadam area was remote and largely uninhabited and known as Spadeadam Waste. The name is possibly a corruption of Cumbric ysbyddaden "hawthorn", or "ysbytybrenin" "king's hostel", and in 1950 the recorded pronunciation was /spɪdɪdəm/. It is mentioned as "Speir Adam" or "Spear Edom" in "Hobie Noble".

== History ==
=== Cold War ===
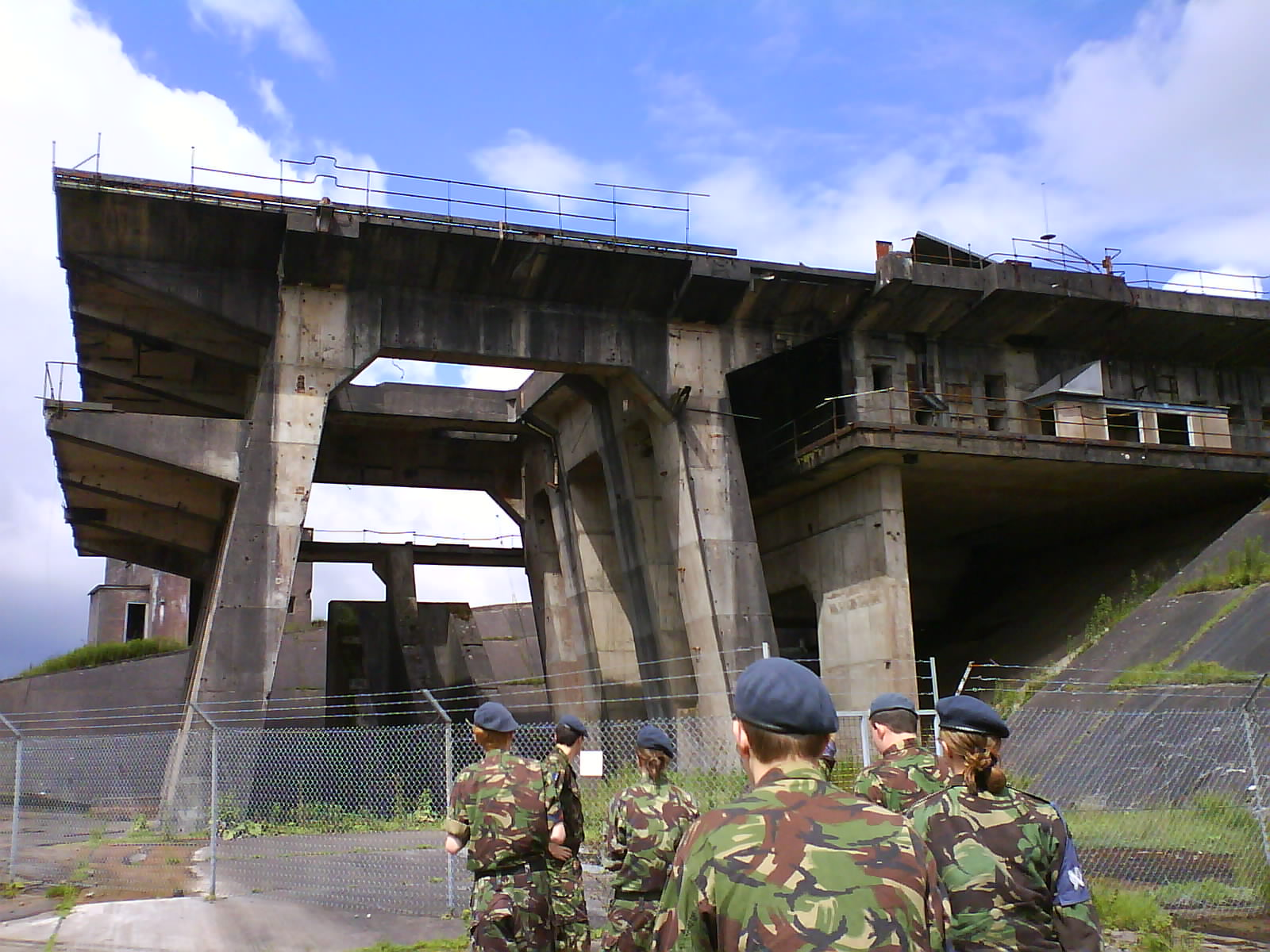
One of the rocket-firing stands for the Blue Streak missile at RAF Spadeadam

The site was first built in 1955 to be the test centre for the Blue Streak intermediate-range ballistic missile project. The role of Spadeadam in Britain's Cold War nuclear weapons programme was made public in 2004 when tree felling uncovered remains of abandoned excavations for an experimental missile silo. Spadeadam was probably intended to be one of 60 launch sites planned for remote locations.

The Rocket Establishment, as it was called, was divided into five areas: an administration and assembly block, a British Oxygen Company compound for on-site liquid oxygen fuel manufacture, a component test area, the engine test area and the static firing stands. The engine test area at Prior Lancy Rigg consisted of four concrete stands into which the engines could be mounted for test firing. Two rocket-firing stands themselves stood at Greymare Hills and were large enough to accommodate a full Blue Streak missile.

The RAF took the site over in 1976 and it became Europe's first electronic warfare tactics range in 1977.

=== Post-Cold War ===
The site continues to be used in training the Royal Air Force and NATO allied aircrew in electronic warfare. It also hosts other exercising forces such as JFACTSU forward air controller training delivered from RAF Leeming in North Yorkshire. Close air support (CAS) training is carried out too. Since 2006, this has been the only mainland UK location where aircrews can drop practice bombs.

DNV (previously Advantica) uses the site for industrial hazard testing including fire and the destruction of pipelines. The remoteness of the area is key to their operations.

In July 2021, RAF Spadeadam was used to conduct drone swarm trials; a first for the British Armed Forces.

== Site Layout ==
The original missile testing establishment had the following main sites:

=== Main Building Complex (NY 6158 7020) ===
This main building complex comprises a gatehouse, security building, offices, warehouses and equipment stores, parking, mess halls, accommodation block, fire station, maintenance facilities and a conference room. This main part of the site also originally housed component assembly facilities. The main building complex has been developed and evolved over time to meet the needs of the re-purposed establishment, but a reminder to its original purpose is visible to everyone who visits, one of the Blue Streak Rocket bodies (NY 6152 7035). In 2015 a new ‘Combined Single Living Accommodation Mess’ was opened (NY 6149 7040). There is now a very well-equipped gym with fitness suite and sauna also a squash court, sports hall, and sports pitch. The ‘Greg Cameron Welfare Facility’ provides access to a learning suite and classroom, a SSAFA and Padre room, and a leisure and vending area.

=== Air Separation Plant (NY 6140 7040) ===
The now defunct and derelict British Oxygen Corporation ‘Air Separation Plant’ sits to the northwest of the main building complex. The site was operated independently by British Oxygen and produced the LOX fuel used by the Blue Streak engines. The site is a Scheduled Monument (list entry number 1413095). Construction started in 1957 and it was probably operational by 1959.

=== Component Test Area (NY 6121 7072) ===
The now largely derelict component test area was located to the northwest of the main building complex and used for the testing and calibration of sub-assemblies of the missile’s component parts. Individual parts were stress tested to assure reliable performance. Construction of these facilities was between 1957 and 1959. This is a Schedule Monument (list entry number 1413096).

=== Priorlancy Rigg Engine Test Area (NY 5964 7190) ===
The main engine testing area at Priorlancy Rigg sits about 2.5 kilometres northwest of the main building complex. The site comprises four test stands and a number of ancillary buildings. To the southeast of the engine testing area is a large settling pond used to capture the large amounts of cooling water used during an engine test. Of the four test stands only three were ever fully commissioned with the fourth, at the west end of the site, being constructed, but not used. This site is a Scheduled Monument (list entry number 1413098).

=== Greymare Hill Missile/Rocket Test Area (NY 6210 7428) ===
The main missile testing stands at Greymare Hill sit about 4 kilometres north of the main building complex, in the most northerly part of the wider rocket establishment. The site comprises two stands, designed for the test firing of complete missiles. Around the stand there are various ancillary buildings and, to the south, is the main control centre, which had clear views of both stands. Each stand had their own fuel storage facilities and separate settling ponds for the cooling water used during testing. The stands were constructed between 1958 and 1969. On cancellation of Blue Streak, the stands were referred to as ‘rocket’ test stands with reference to the ELDO Europa 1 rocket. This is a Scheduled Monument (list entry number 1413099).

=== Underground Missile Launch Facility (NY 6278 7383) ===
About 500 metres to the southeast of the rocket testing bays is the site of an underground missile launch silo. This site had remained hidden until it was discovered during forestry operations in 2004. This is a Scheduled Monument (list entry number 14143097).

In addition to the original sites, as described above, there are further sites that have been developed since the rocket testing facility transitioned to an Electronic Warfare Threat Training Facility. These are:

=== Berry Hill Operations Control Centre (NY 6472 7303) ===
The buildings at Berry Hill house the Battlespace Management (Air Traffic Management) (BMATM) for Spadeadam Electronic Warfare Threat Training Facility. The control centre was opened in 1992 by the William Whitelaw.

=== Radar Tower (Greymare Hill) (NY 6179 7451) ===
Located on higher ground, just northwest of the Rocket Test Stands at Greymore hill, Spadeadam’s Secondary Surveillance Radar (SSR) radar tower provides backup operational radar coverage for the Electronic Warfare Threat Training Facility. The tower is a simple reinforced concrete design.

=== Helipad (Green Hill) (NY 6399 7375) ===
Just to the northwest of Berry Hill is a large concrete heliport. It is not known whether this is a repurposed bit of infrastructure dating back to the rocket establishment or whether it was constructed as part of the development of the electronic warfare range.

=== Wiley Sike Firing Range (NY 6279 7120) ===
Although the whole site is used for electronic warfare, and there are dummy targets scattered across the whole of the Spadeadam estate, the Wiley Sike range is the only part of the establishment where live firing is permitted. The site includes a simple mock village (NY 6446 7159) as well as various other discrete targets.

=== Colinski Airfield (NY 6502 7463) ===
Not real, but a mock airfield comprising three short runways laid out in crushed stone across the moorland. The airfield is one of the many visual targets on the wider training area. The airfield hosts a number of mock targets and obsolete aircraft.

=== DNV ===
Det Norske Veritas (DNV) operate a research and development facility from within the RAF Spadeadam estate. The facility is focused on fire, explosion, blast and ballistic testing of various industrial materials. DNV operates from 2 main compounds which are adjacent to each other, Test Site East (NY 6228 7250) and Test Site West (NY 6060 7263). Test Site East is the main and original compound with facilities being extended into Test Site West in the early 2010’s. Occasionally a third site is used, outside of DNV’s main compound but within the wider Spadeadam estate. In 2021 DNV started constructing a hydrogen pipeline research facility within their Test Site West compound.

== Landscape ==
The outlying moorland landscape of the site is of increasing importance for its visual quality and for nature conservation. The area includes a pristine peat bog, populations of all three species of British newt and forestry habitat suitable for endangered red squirrels. Otters have been noted along the watercourses and still ponds that are dotted across the vast training area. Trees that were planted on the site after the First World War were felled in 2008 to 2009 to allow the peat bogs to return. Despite concerns about trees being carbon sinks, the rarity of the peat habitat meant the Forestry Commission decided to fell 145,000 trees.

== Freedoms ==
RAF Spadeadam has received the Freedom of several locations throughout its history; these include:

- (England) 18 June 2017: Brampton.
- (England) 2 June 2018: Carlisle.
