= Joint Forward Air Control Training and Standardisation Unit =

UK Joint military training school

Joint Forward Air Control Training and Standardisation Unit JFACTSU
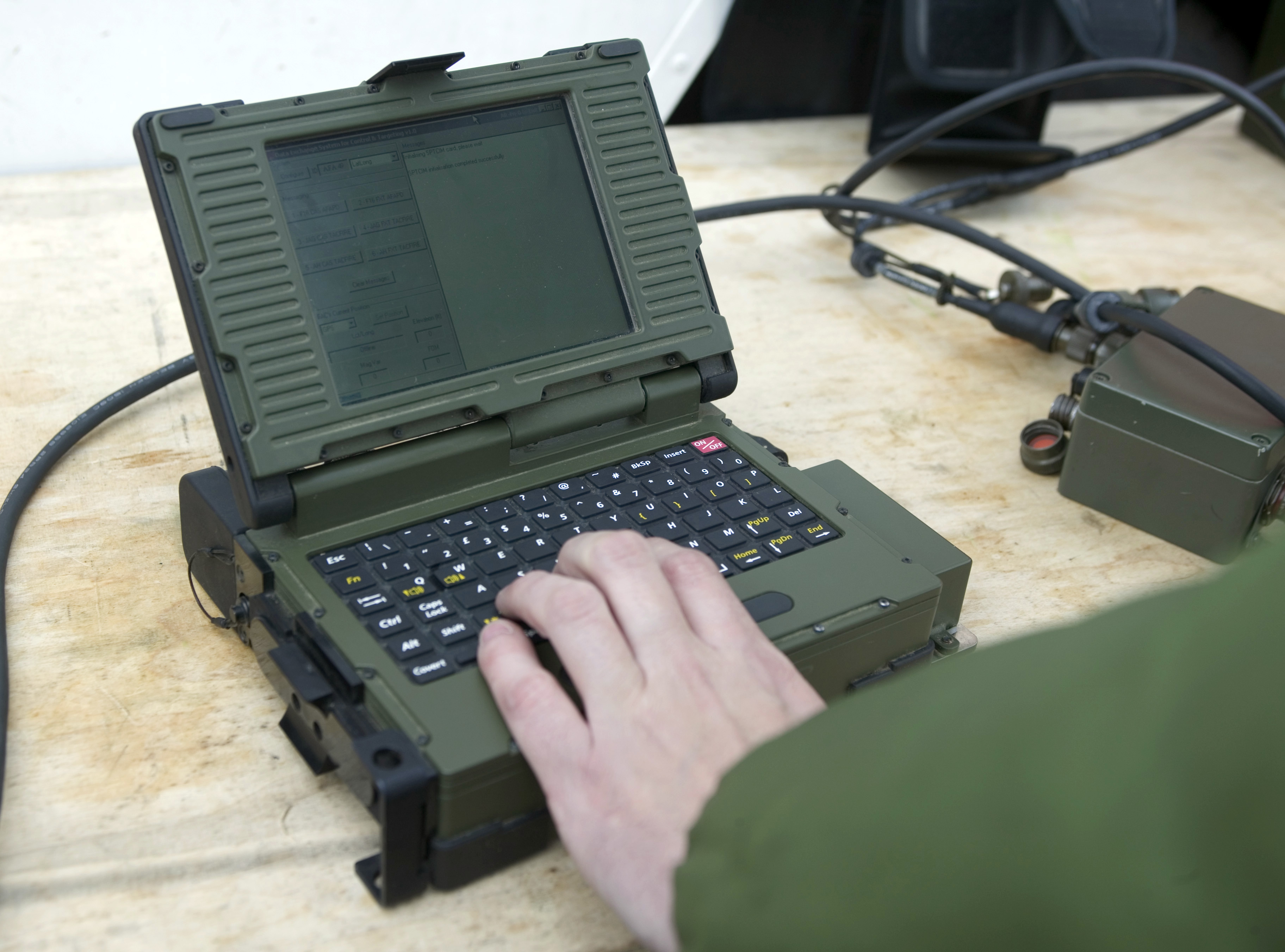
- An improved data modem computer being used in a JFACTSU training course in 2004.
- Active: 1964–present
- Country: United Kingdom
- Branch: (United Kingdom) Royal Navy; British Army; Royal Air Force
- Type: Training
- Role: Forward Air Controller training
- Garrison/HQ: RAF Chivenor, Devon, England 1964–1977 RAF Brawdy, Pembrokeshire, Wales 1977–1993; RAF Finningley, Yorkshire, England 1993–1995 RAF Leeming, Yorkshire, England 1995– 54°17′50.9″N 1°31′36.4″W

The Joint Forward Air Control Training and Standardisation Unit (JFACTSU) is a training unit located at RAF Leeming in North Yorkshire, England. The unit teaches students from across all three services of the British Armed Forces (and international allies) to become Forward Air Controllers (FACs). Forward Air Controllers, working from a forward position on the ground, or in the air, direct the fire of combat aircraft that are engaged in close air support of land forces.

== History ==
During the First World War, troops on the ground would use flares, ground markers and flags to guide pilots in on targets. The difficulties in actual communication between the air and the ground meant that real time information was lost. By the time of the Africa Campaign in 1941, man portable radios were available for troops on the ground to brief aircrew. This lead in turn to the establishment of Forward Air Support Links (FASL) (or Rover Parties) which involved soldiers and airmen of RAF Desert Air Force.

After the Second World War, the lessons learned were taken forward into the Air Land Integration policy of the School of Land-Air Warfare (SLAW) which taught formal FAC training at RAF Old Sarum in Wiltshire. When flying ceased at RAF Old Sarum, the FAC training moved on as part of the Joint Warfare Establishment, firstly to RAF Chivenor, then to RAF Brawdy.

When RAF Brawdy was decommissioned as an RAF base and handed over to the army, JFACTSU moved to RAF Finningley in South Yorkshire. Finningley then closed just two years later and in 1995, JFACTSU moved to its present location at RAF Leeming in North Yorkshire as the Joint Forward Air Control Training and Standardisation Unit.

British Forward Air Controllers have been deployed into many conflicts and operations such as Korea, Malaya, Suez, Indonesia, Aden, Oman, Falklands, Operation Granby, Operation Agricola, Operation Telic and Operation Herrick.

== Training ==
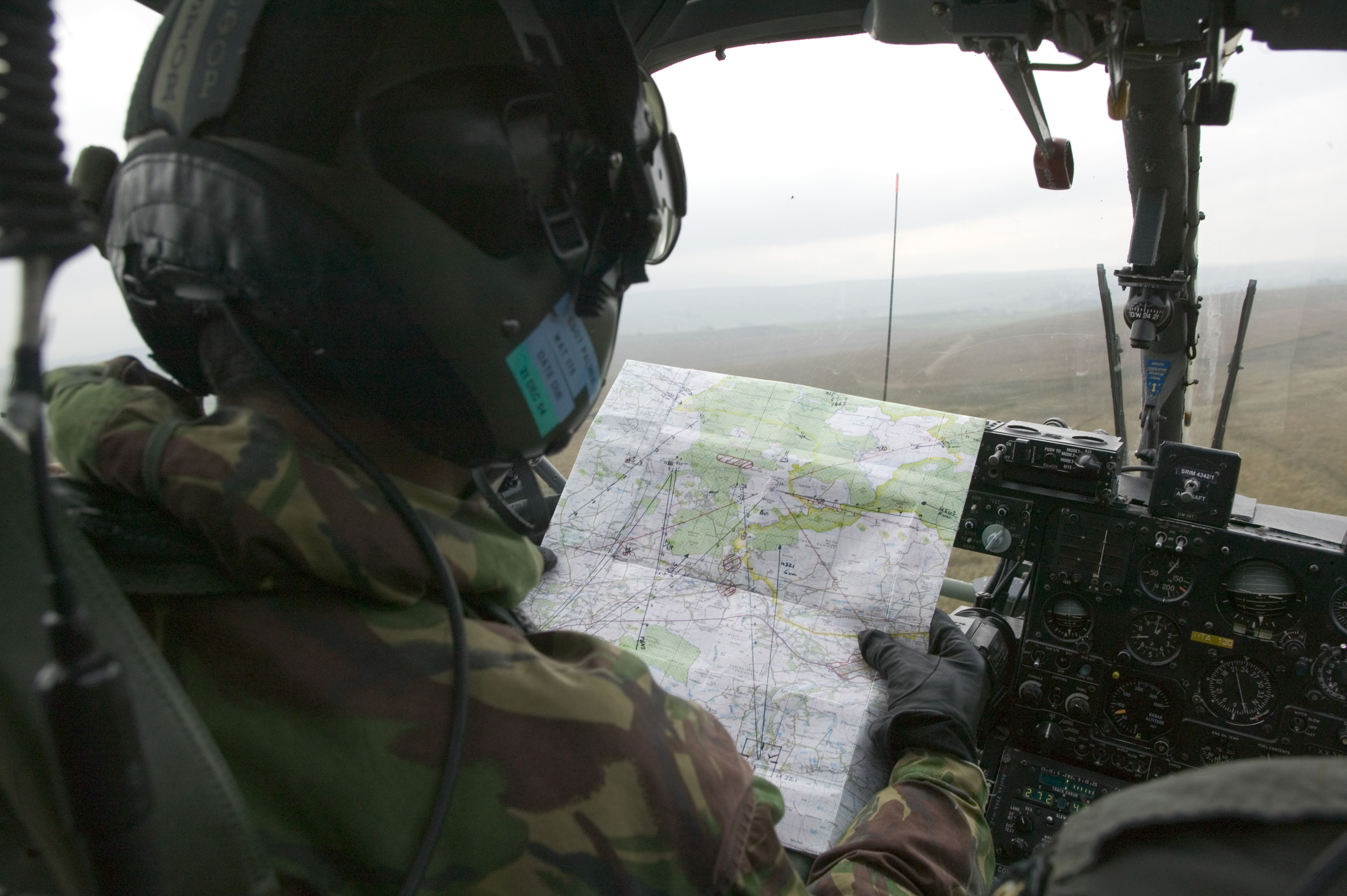
A JFACTSU student on board an Army Gazelle helicopter consulting a map, while calling in the coordinates of a potential target.

JFACTSU have two Hawk aircraft and two pilots on their staff who are overseen in flying matters at the adjacent hangar on RAF Leeming in North Yorkshire.

Students on the course are taught how to request, plan, brief and execute close air support operations. Students also have the opportunity to fly back seat in one of the Hawk aircraft, to experience first hand what the pilot will be seeing and hearing. The four to eight week course (depending on the specialization and security restrictions) culminates in a training exercise held at RAF Spadeadam in Cumbria, where the students call in mock attacks from the Hawks. Training can also be delivered via a state of the art iCASS (Immersive Close Air Support Simulator), that was purchased for JFACTSU in 2014.

Forward Air Controller training can also be conducted at Pembrey Sands Air Weapons Range in Pembrokeshire, South Wales. This range is open to all UK and NATO allied forces.

It is noted as being a centre for FAC training and has in the past trained students from Canada, the Czech Republic, Denmark, Hungary, Malaysia, New Zealand, Norway, Poland, Slovak Republic, Sweden, The Netherlands and the United States. Many of these were trained as NATO allies and some (Czech Republic, Hungary and Poland) were trained before they became NATO partners and allies. Prince Harry is among the British graduates of training courses conducted by the JFACTSU.

After training, RAF FAC personnel (mostly from the RAF Regiment) operate from a central pool at RAF Honington in Suffolk.

== Aircraft ==
Since its inception, JFACTSU have utilized two types of airframe for initial training; Hawker Hunters at Chivenor and Brawdy and BAe Hawks at Finningley and now Leeming.
