= Listed buildings in Hudswell, North Yorkshire =

Hudswell is a civil parish in the county of North Yorkshire, England. It contains three listed buildings that are recorded in the National Heritage List for England. All the listed buildings are designated at Grade II, the lowest of the three grades, which is applied to "buildings of national importance and special interest". The parish contains the village of Hudswell and the surrounding countryside, and the listed buildings consist of a farmhouse, a church and a bridge.

== Buildings ==
Name and location	Photograph	Date	Notes
East Under Bank; 54.40119°N 1.78162°W	—	Early 18th century	A farmhouse in stone with quoins and an artificial slate roof. There are two storeys and an L-shaped plan, with a front range of three bays and a rear wing. In the centre is a doorway with a three-pane fanlight, there are casement windows in the ground floor, and horizontally-sliding sash windows above. The rear wing contains chamfered mullioned windows, and in the angle is a curved structure.
Lownethwaite Bridge; 54.40150°N 1.77622°W		1836	The bridge carries Reeth Road (A6108 road) over the River Swale. It is in stone, and consists of five segmental arches on pointed cutwaters. The bridge has a band, and a parapet with segmental coping.
St Michael's Church; 54.39910°N 1.78449°W		1884	The church is in sandstone with a Welsh slate roof. It consists of a nave, a south porch, a chancel with a north vestry, and a southwest octagonal steeple. Over the doorway is a carved head, and inside the porch are three medieval grave covers. The east window has three trefoiled lights and a sexfoil above, and the other windows are lancets.
