= Heraldic badges of the Royal Air Force =

Insignia of certain groups and branches within the Royal Air Force

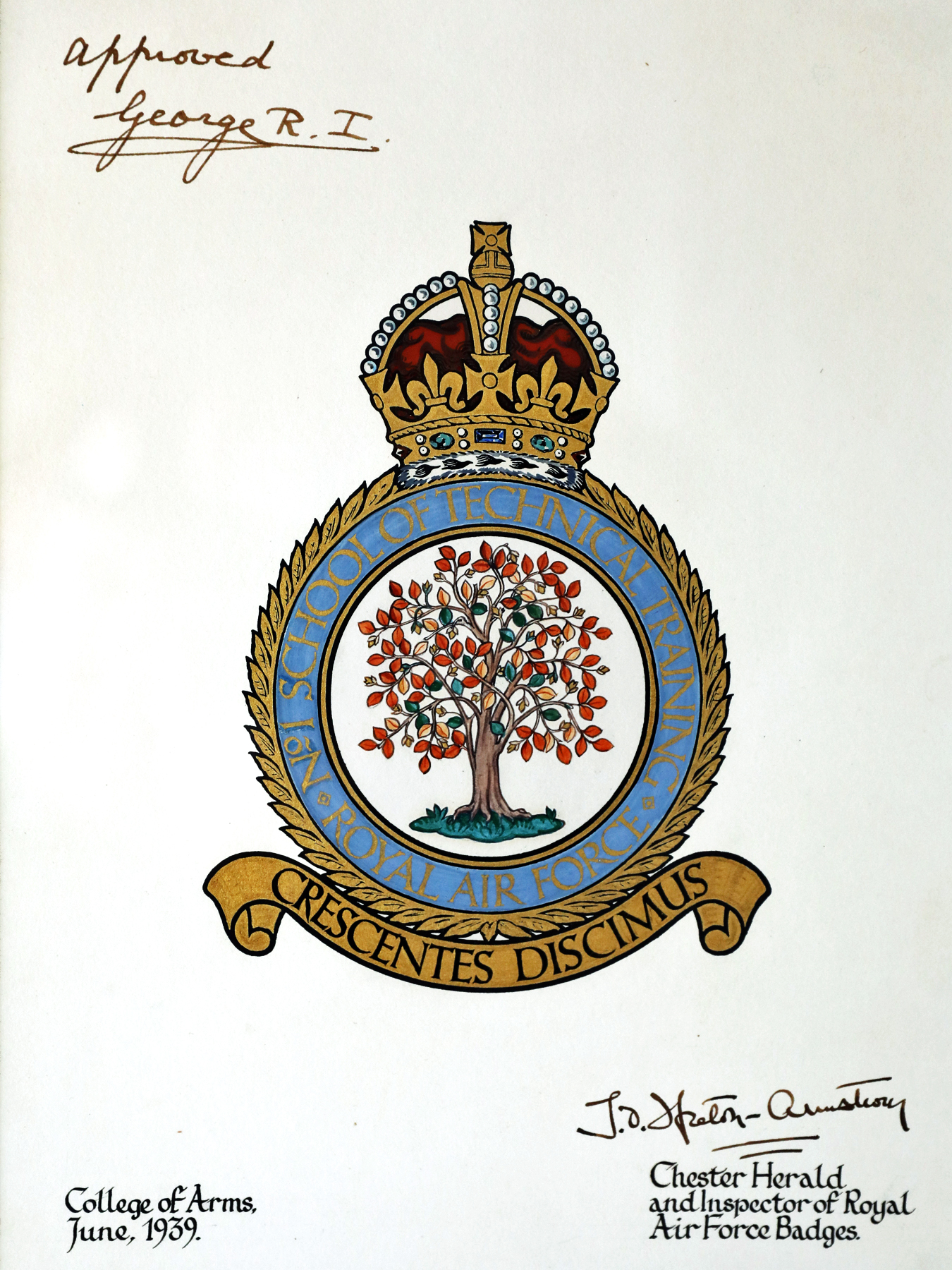
The original painting of the No. 1 School of Technical Training badge, Royal Air Force. The beech tree represents the wood at RAF Halton where the school was first formed. Note the approval signature by King George VI. The motto translates as Growing we learn.

Heraldic badges of the Royal Air Force are the insignia of certain commands, squadrons, units, wings, groups, branches and stations within the Royal Air Force. They are also commonly known as crests, especially by serving members of the Royal Air Force, but officially they are badges. Each badge, approved by the reigning monarch of the time, depicts either the Tudor Crown or St Edward's Crown at the top, dependent upon which monarch granted its approval and the disbandment date of the unit. (Note: Most units/squadrons and bases had their badges updated to the St Edward's Crown design sometime after the accession of Elizabeth II, (although in some cases many years elapsed before the badge was updated). Most of the flying units were disbanded after the Second World War, so their badges retained the Tudor Crown. Queen Elizabeth II promulgated an order in October 1954 detailing that all current badges in use, and from that date on, were to use the St Edward's Crown.) The approval process involves a member of the College of Arms (the Inspector of RAF Badges) who acts as an advisor on the design and suitability of the insignia and motto.

Some badges that have been approved by either King Edward VIII or George VI adopted the St Edward's Crown after Queen Elizabeth II's accession in 1952. The number of badges that King Edward VIII approved is limited due to his short time on the throne. After the coronation of King Charles III in May 2023, the badges will be redrawn with a Tudor Crown.

== History ==
The first badge adopted by the RAF was the official Royal Air Force Badge. It was instituted on 1 August 1918, some four months after the formation of the Royal Air Force. Afterwards, units and squadrons adopted their own insignia and used them in a way similar to a regimental colour. For some squadrons, their unofficial badges pre-dated the formation of the RAF. Most Royal Flying Corps squadrons during the First World War painted their squadron emblem, or device, on a shield to hang up in the mess or squadron bar. They often viewed themselves as 'knights of the air' and the badge helped foster a sense of identity.

In the case of 100 Squadron, their badge incorporated a skull and crossbones insignia that had been liberated from a French "house of ill-repute" in 1918. Some mascots were back formations from the badge rather than supplying the idea for the badge. No. 234 Squadron had "a dragon rampant, with flames issuing from the mouth" approved by King George VI in August 1940. By 1956, the squadron were at RAF Geilenkirchen in Germany and were looking for a suitable mascot for their squadron based on its dragon insignia; they reportedly would settle for an iguana.

Until the early 1930s, squadrons and units used their own informal badges and insignia. In 1935, the process of formalising the badges was undertaken whereby an official heraldic approval would be granted by the monarch. The whole design process ultimately rested with the Chester Herald as the Inspector of RAF Badges. This has changed over the years and has been filled by Clarenceux King of Arms and by the Surrey Herald of Arms Extraordinary. The Inspector of RAF Badges liaised with squadrons and units to finalise designs that reflected already adopted insignia or to utilise something suitable to recognise the squadron or unit. (Note: This would also mean refusing badges if they did not meet with the standard or infringe on other already existing and approved badges. In 1937, 6 Squadron submitted their original badge, it was politely refused. It clashed with the design of the No. 1 Squadron badge and also had a number within the main body of the badge; for squadrons, the number would go on the circular frame.) An Air Ministry Order (A.8/1936) was issued in January 1936 and detailed the criteria for badges and their ultimate approval via the Chester Herald and the King. In June 1936, King Edward VIII approved the first raft of badges for numbers 4, 15, 18, 19, 22, 33, 201, 207, 216 and 604 Squadrons.

The badge design and approval process applies to all Royal Air Force units; Regular, Reserve, Auxiliary and Air Training Corps.

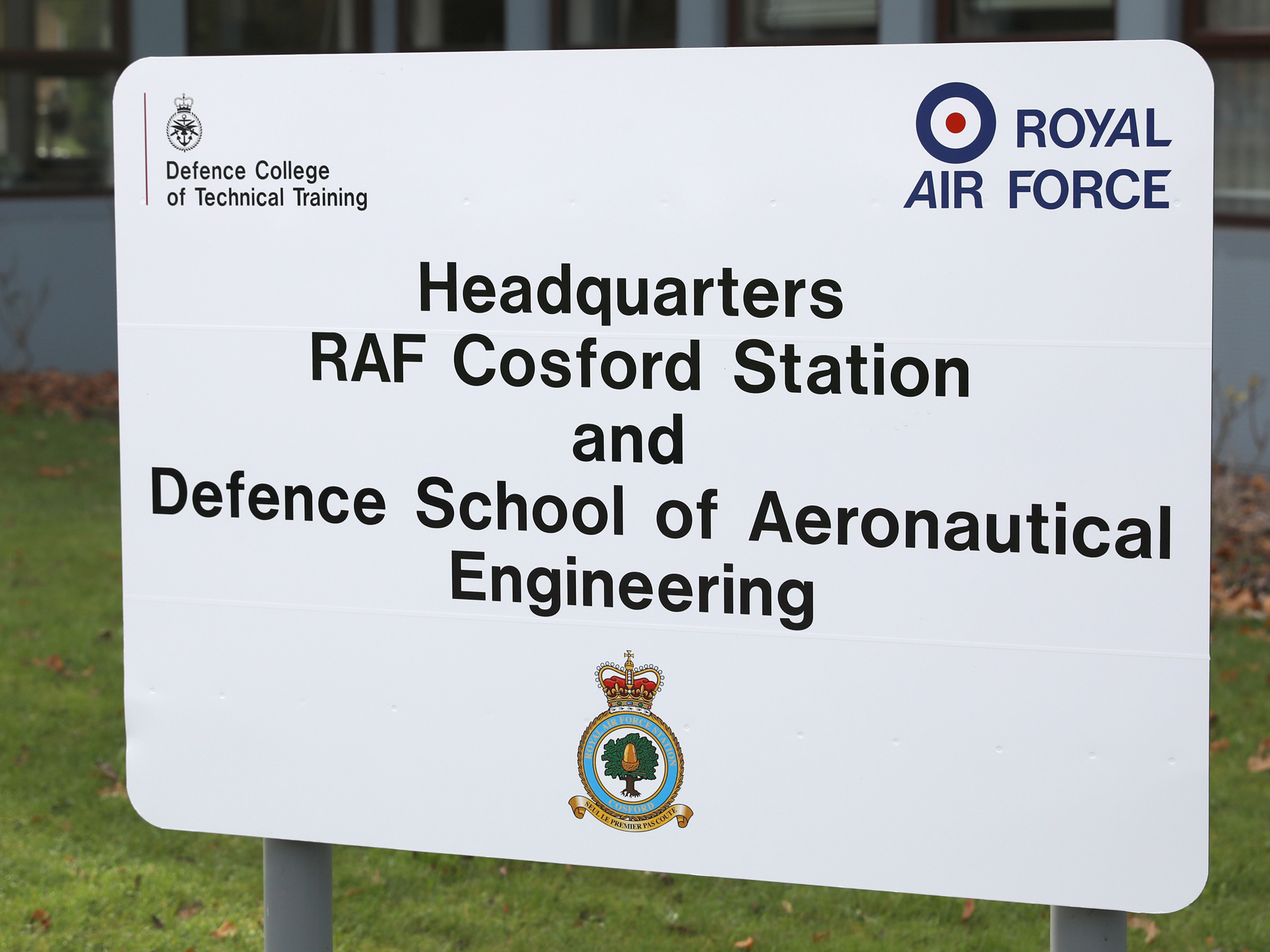
A sign outside the station headquarters at RAF Cosford, with the station badge at the bottom

When a new badge is granted an approval by the reigning monarch, the unit or squadron is presented with the original goatskin painting signed by the monarch and copies will be made and drawn to the standard set by the original. The Inspector of RAF badges keeps copies which are registered in large albums known as "The Inspector's ordinary copies".

In the case of No. 273 Squadron, their badge was still awaiting final approval after several re-submissions which had been rejected by Air Command South-East Asia and by the Inspector of Badges. This hinged upon the proposed use of a swastika or fylfot. The squadron was disbanded in 1945 before being issued a badge due to uncertainty on a design or motto. A campaign in 1996 to have the badge issued for the veterans of No. 273 Squadron was unsuccessful despite the backing of several MPs, and it was finally awarded to the squadron association in principle.

If a unit could not adhere to the qualifying heraldic criteria, then a badge would not be issued. Where badges had not been issued or even applied for, a badge of a higher authority could be used instead. RAF Cowden in East Yorkshire used the Strike Command badge as it was an air weapons range. RAF Bridgnorth used the badge of No. 7 School of Recruit Training as that was the station's reason for existence.

The rules regarding badges were changed over the years and since 1992, public funds could be used to pay for the badge design. Previously, money had to be raised by the squadron or unit to pay for the process. A unit must have been in existence for five years, and expect to be in existence for another five years, and have a personnel strength of more than 75.

Under certain circumstances, badges from defunct units have been resurrected when new units or wings have been formed. Squadron badges are not usually reassigned, as normally the squadron just assumes an old number and accepts that badge and motto. When the Force Generation Wing (FGW) from No. 90 Signals Unit at RAF Leeming was re-formed as the Operational Information Services Wing (OISW), it was approved for a close copy version of the former No. 60 Group (Signals) badge. The only differences were that the name of the unit was changed, and the indentations where the unit number used to be on the main badge were removed.

Over 800 squadron and unit badges, carved from Welsh slate, are set into the floor of the central church of the Royal Air Force, St Clement Danes, London. The first carved badge was placed in the floor by its carver, Madge Whiteman, in 1958. Whiteman carved at least 80 more. The intention at the time was for there to eventually be 1,000 badges set into the floor. In 1996, the RAF Heraldry Trust was set up to paint every badge issued to either Royal Air Force or Commonwealth Air Forces where an approved badge was issued. A selection of replica RAF badges adorns the walls of the RAF Club in London.

=== Design ===
The common elements of a typical squadron badge

The common elements of a station badge

The badge consists of five distinct parts;

- the crown - either the Tudor Crown or St Edward's Crown, dependent on when it was issued, and its periodicity. (Note: Squadrons formed during, or just before, the Second World War, were issued with badges that had a Tudor Crown. A large swathe were disbanded at the cessation of hostilities, and so were never issued with an updated badge during the reign of Elizabeth II.)
- the body - a circular frame coloured with RAF blue and with indentations for operationally numbered units, surrounded by a wreath of leaves (Note: The type of outer leaves also denoted the country of origin; British units had laurel leaves, maple leaves for Canadian squadrons, protea flower for South Africa, Wattle for Australia and fern for New Zealand.)
- the insignia within the body, known as the Blazon in heraldry,
- the scroll
- the motto

RAF Badges are often called 'crests', even by serving members of the military, but they are in fact, heraldic badges. Crests is a common misnomer and represents just one part of a badge in heraldic terms. A crest is usually atop a coat of arms, while RAF badges have a crown.

One exception to this is No. 600 Squadron, which has two badges. The first was the traditional badge with a sword in front of a crescent moon, which reflected the squadron's night-time activities. The second badge, also known affectionately by the squadron as "The Dust-Cart Crest", was the badge of the City of London Arms. As this had the appearance of the RAF eagle at the top and not the crown, this could be interpreted as a crest. (Note: No. 600 Squadron instituted their own badge in the early 1920s which was based upon the City of London arms with the addition of the RAF eagle above it. When the RAF Squadrons were advised to apply for their badges, the squadron assumed theirs would go through. The Inspector of RAF Badges would not agree to the RAF eagle being on the badge and suggested a Wren instead. The squadron did not like this and so the matter was forgotten about and the squadron carried on without a badge. After many casualties and postings in the Second World War, the squadron was in North Africa with a new Commanding Officer (CO) who was unaware of the disagreement with the Inspector of RAF Badges. He applied for, and was approved, a badge with the sword and the crescent moon, which was signed by King George VI. After the war when the squadron was reformed, they reverted to using the old badge. At dinner with the Queen (Queen Elizabeth The Queen Mother) when she became honorary Air Commodore, the squadron presented her with the "Dust-Cart Badge" and maintained that it was their official badge. The Queen promised to "have a word with the King about it." The King duly signed the 'old' badge and approved it (despite the apparent apoplexy of the Chester Herald who maintained it was not heraldic), and so the squadron has two badges. Only the dust-cart badge is used, which has no motto like 607 Squadron.)

One of the few squadrons to not have a scroll is No. 607 Squadron, as it does not have a motto. Many mottoes were suggested for 607 Squadron, which have been described as being from "suitable to the ribald."

=== Squadrons and stations ===
Flying squadrons were expected to display their badge, or the main insignia/blazon from it, on their aircraft. This was also to be enhanced by the addition of a white shape behind the badge or insignia to improve its visibility. The particular shape would denote the role of the squadron; either a fighter, bomber or reconnaissance squadron, though some doubled up on their role. Non-flying units would display their badge on a sign either at the entrance to the base or outside the station headquarters.

The background shapes as adorned on Royal Air Force aircraft to denote the type of role operated by that particular squadron; A) Fighter/Fighter Reconnaissance, B) Bomber/Torpedo Bomber, C) General Reconnaissance/Army Co-operation

One of the first squadrons to be awarded their badge was No. 18 Squadron, which had a winged white pegasus as their insignia which dated back to the First World War. When the badge was approved in 1936, the pegasus had been redrawn with a more upright rearing stance and was now painted in gules, which is the colour red in heraldry.

No. 208 Squadron had been in Egypt for 17 years when they asked for approval for their squadron badge. Due to their motto of Vigilant and the nature of their work (observation), they had been using the Eye of Horus as their squadron insignia. The Chester Herald informed the squadron that the use of an eye was considered unlucky in English Heraldry, so the squadron adopted the Giza Sphinx as their insignia instead. The badge was approved by King George VI in October 1937.

Another squadron with associations in Egypt was No. 45 Squadron, which had a winged camel on their badge. This represented the fact the squadron was equipped with Sopwith Camel aircraft in the First World War and its association with the Middle-East in the Second World War.

The badge of No. 22 Squadron has a red disc (torteaux) with a Maltese Cross and the symbol for pi. This is because when No. 7 Squadron and 22 Sqn were stationed together during the First World War, 22 Sqn would take off directly over the 7 Sqn Lines (accommodation) and the fraction 22/7 approximates to pi. No. 81 Squadron badge has a red star (mullet) of Russia as its insignia. The Russians awarded the squadron the star when they took Hawker Hurricanes to Murmansk to train the Soviet crews during the Second World War.

Squadrons would often use insignia reflecting where they had served. RAF stations would often use a local landmark or item particular to the area. RAF St Eval had a church in the middle of their badge, St Uvelus, which was under threat of demolition when the airfield was being built. It survived and became a repository for remembrance of fallen comrades. It also acted as a sign to crews that they were nearly home.

RAF Scampton's badge has a bow and arrow insignia. This represented the airfield (the arrow) and the moving of the A15 so that the runway could be extended to 10,000 feet (3,000 m), creating a bow formation of the road at the eastern end of the airfield.

The station badge for RAF Waddington consists of a small part of Lincoln Cathedral, a focussing point for crews returning from active missions. The badge was approved in 1954 by Queen Elizabeth II.

Other stations had badges designed to reflect their role. In 1957, RAF Marham was awarded their new badge which depicted a blue bull as its insignia and the motto of Deter. The motto indicated their base's new role in the nuclear deterrent role and the bull symbolised that deterrence. The colour blue is thought to have a been a nod towards the Blue Danube, the RAF's first atomic bomb.

=== Mottoes ===
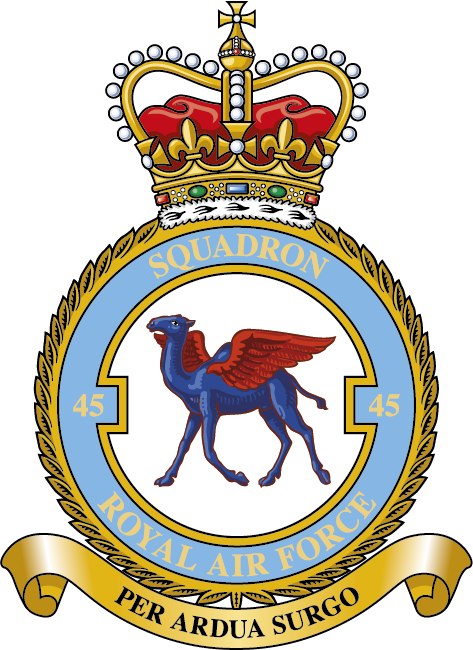
45 Squadron badge with St Edward's Crown

Mottoes convey the spirit of the unit or squadron. For commands and training stations, this was usually about what the intended output of that particular role was. Bomber and Fighter Commands had badges where the blazon and motto reflected that role. Bomber Command's motto was Strike hard, strike sure. Fighter command had the motto of Offence defence. Elements of both blazons and mottoes were included in the Strike Command badge that superseded both Bomber and Fighter Command when they were combined as Strike Command in 1968.

No. 617 Squadron's motto is Après moi le déluge which translates from the French as "After me, the flood". This reflected the reason that the squadron was created, to bomb the dams in the Ruhr Valley. King George VI approved the badge for 617 Squadron in March 1944, some ten months after the Dambusters Raid. (Note: Wg Cdr Gibson held a competition amongst the aircrew for a badge for the squadron. When the King and Queen visited the squadron, they were shown the 'proofs' and they both chose the same badge and it was duly despatched to the Chester Herald for approval. The design was unproblematic, but the original motto chosen was Apres nous le deluge as uttered by Marie Antoinette, so it had a royal connection. Unfortunately, the Chester Herald disapproved of the negative connotations of the original statement. It was changed to Apres moi le deluge which again, the Chester Herald disapproved of because a Greek philosopher had said it to show selfishness. The aircrew, by now tired of the situation, politely informed the Chester Herald that the King had approved the badge some months before, so the Herald was going against the King's wishes. Soon after, a letter arrived from the Herald stating that he had no idea that the King had approved the badge and that he did not want to interfere with the King's prerogative. The description of the badge was; "On a roundel, a wall in fesse, fractured by three flashes of light-ning[sic] in pile and issuant from the breach, water proper.") Most mottoes are written in Latin or English, though other languages were used:

| Unit | Motto | Language | Translation | Notes |
|---|---|---|---|---|
| No. 14 Squadron | أنا نشر الأجنحة بلدي وابقي على وعد | Arabic | I spread my wings and keep my promise | |
| No. 257 Squadron | Thay myay gyeeshin shwe hti | Burmese | Death or Glory | |
| No. 268 Squadron | Ajidaumo | Chippewa | Tail-in-the-air | |
| No. 1 Squadron RAF Regiment | | Cuneiform | Swift and sudden | |
| No. 68 Squadron | Vždy připraven | Czech | Always ready | (Note: Was reformed in 1941 with mostly Czechoslovak members) |
| No. 3 Group RAF | Niet zonder arbyt | Dutch | Nothing without labour | |
| RAF Cosford | Seul le premier pas coute | French | Only the beginning is difficult | |
| RAF Machrihanish | Airm a dhionadh na fairgeachan | Gaelic | Arms to defend the seas | |
| No. 150 Squadron | Αιει Φθανομεν | Greek | Always ahead | (Note: The squadron formed at Kirec, in what was Macedonia, in 1918) |
| No. 224 Squadron | Fidelle all' amico | Italian | Faithful to a friend | (Note: The badge is based upon the Arms of Otranto where the squadron was formed.) |
| No. 185 Squadron | Ara fejn hu | Maltese | Look where it is | (Note: The badge was designed whilst the squadron was in Malta and the blazon of the dragon on the badge signifies the defence against the attacks on the island) |
| No. 75 Squadron | Ake ake kia kaha | Māori | For ever and ever be strong | (Note: The squadron was largely crewed by New Zealanders and had a Tiki (Māori lucky ornament) as its insignia. Was disbanded in 1945 but the badge, honours and squadron plate were transferred to the Royal New Zealand Air Force.) |
| No. 160 Squadron | Api soya paragasamu | Sinhalese | We seek and strike | |
| No. 164 Squadron | Firmes Volamos | Spanish | Firmly we fly | (Note: The squadron was paid for by members of the British expatriate community in Argentina. The squadron was crewed by mainly Argentine volunteers who had British ancestry. The motto and insignia were suggested by the Argentine Ambassador to Britain in 1942; the insignia is of a British lion with a sun rising behind, to represent Argentina.) |
| RAF Eastleigh | Shupavu na thabiti | Swahili | Tough and strong | |
| RAF Pembroke Dock | Gwylio'r gorooewin o'r awyr | Welsh | To watch the west from the air | |

No. 100 Squadron had their badge awarded in 1938 while posted to RAF Seletar and opted to have the motto (Sarang tebuan jengan dijolok; "Never stir up a hornets nest") written in Malaysian. The squadron blazon was traditionally a skull and crossbones, which it retains on its badge, with the motto Blood and Bones. While the squadron was posted to RNAS Donibristle in Fife, they replaced the skull and crossbones motif with a bulldog and the motto Nemo me impune lacessit, ("No-one provokes me with impunity"), but reverted to the old motif and motto soon afterwards.

Other badges were approved for locational reasons. No. 240 Squadron had a badge adorned with a Viking helmet and the motto of Sjo vordur lopt vordur which is Icelandic for "Guardian of the sea and air". Badges were also approved for the squadrons in the non-UK range, IE squadrons in the 300–399 and 400–499 ranges - the Article XV squadrons, such as No. 330 Squadron who had a Viking Longship and the motto of Trygg havet, which was in Norwegian, as it was a Norwegian Squadron, meaning "Guarding the seas." (Note: The Squadron was disbanded by the RAF in November 1945 and transferred to the Royal Norwegian Air Force. The squadron still operates to date with the same motto (Trygg havet) but the insignia has changed. (No. 330 Squadron RNoAF))

The badges approved to Dominion or Commonwealth crews would traditionally incorporate insignia with a connection to the homeland which the crews flying the aircraft belonged to. No. 266 (Rhodesia) Squadron had their badge approved in August 1941 with a Bateleur eagle and the motto of Hlabezulu, which derives from Shona meaning "The stabber of the sky." Badges were issued to non-flying units such as the Iraq Levies, who had a badge approved by King George VI in 1949 that had two crossed Khanjar as its insignia and the motto of Ready.

== Heraldic terminology ==
The component elements of badges are described – with regard to stances, positions, actions, attitudes and tinctures (colours) – by the use of heraldic blazon. The most common terms used are listed below. For example, No. 102 Squadron badge (shown on the right) is described as "On a demi-terrestrial globe azure & dark blue a lion rampant guardant gules holding in the forepaws a bomb sable".

| Heraldic term | Meaning | Heraldic term | Meaning | Heraldic term | Meaning |
|---|---|---|---|---|---|
| Addorsed | Wings spread, back to back | Erased | Torn off (usually at the neck) | Plate | White roundel |
| Affrontée | Full fronted | Fess(e) | Horizontal partition or display | Potent | Crutch - often with four arms |
| Argent | Metal - white or silver | Fimbriated | With an outline of a different tincture | Purpure | The colour purple |
| Azure | The colour blue | Fracted | With fruit | Quadrate | Square on the junction of a cross |
| Base | At the bottom of the display | Guardant | Head towards the observer | Queued | Two tails with the same root |
| Bend | Diagonal partition or display | Gules | The colour red | Rampant | Upright in profile with hind legs on the ground |
| Charged | Placed on | Hurt | Blue Disc | Sable | The colour black |
| Close | With closed wings | Issuant | Appearing from (to issue) | Salient | A beast standing on its hind legs about to pounce |
| Conjoined | Joined together | Mask | Face of an animal affrontée | Saltire | A diagonal cross |
| Couped | Neck cut off straight | Mullet | A five pointed star shape | Seax | Scimitar with a notch on the back of the blade |
| Cubit Arm | An arm cut off at the elbow | Ogress | Circle, usually on a shield | Sinister | To the right (as you look at the badge) |
| Demi | Half | Or | Metal - yellow in colour and represents gold | Torteaux | A red roundel |
| Dexter | To the left (as you look at the badge) | Pale | Vertical partition or display | Vert | The colour green |
| Displayed | Subject is Affrontée, head turned, wings and legs spread | Passant | Walking with three paws on the ground | Voided | The centre removed |
| Eradicated | Uprooted with the roots showing | Pile | Wedge shape | Volant | Flying horizontally |

== Gallery ==
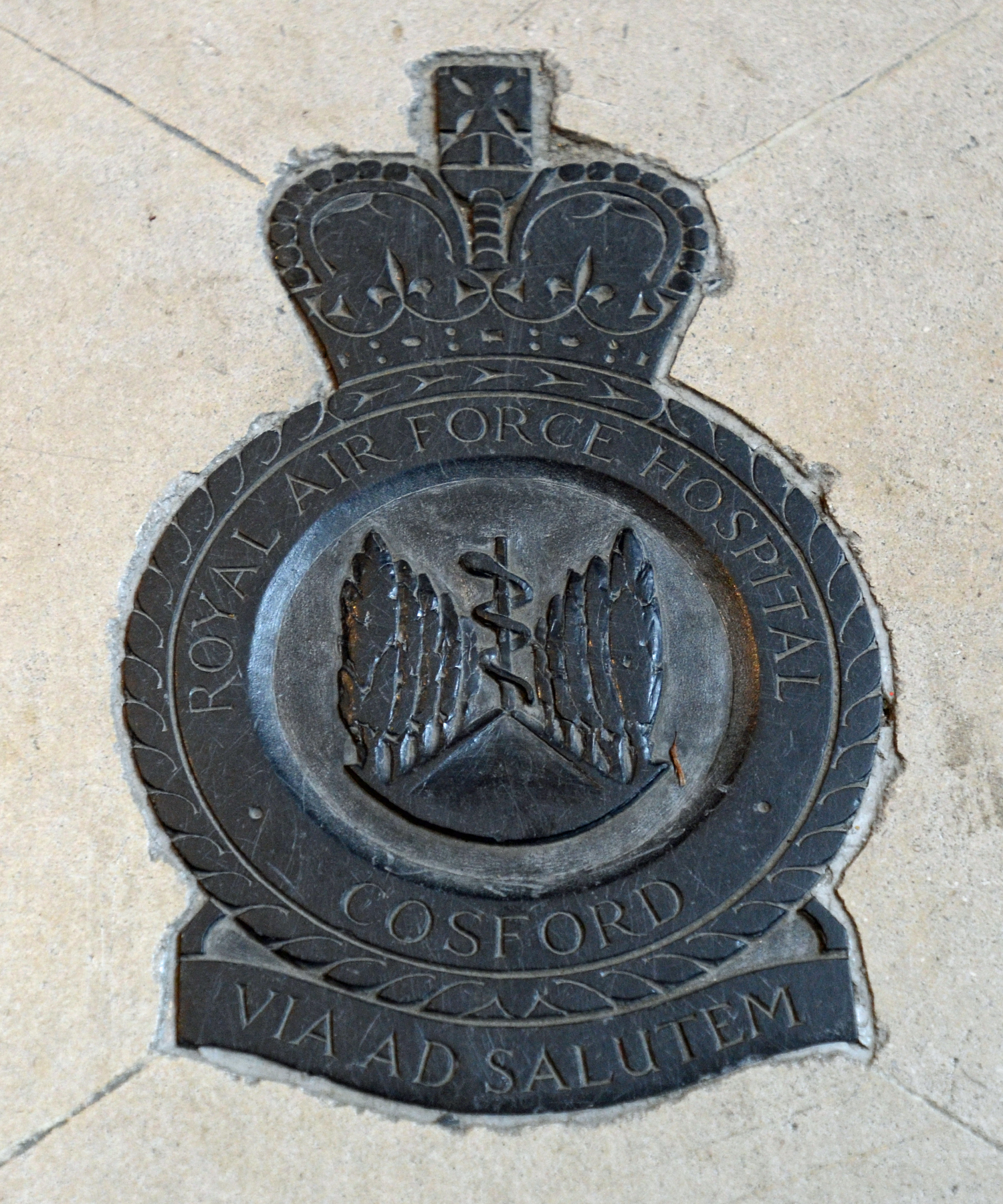
A badge in the floor at St Clement Danes

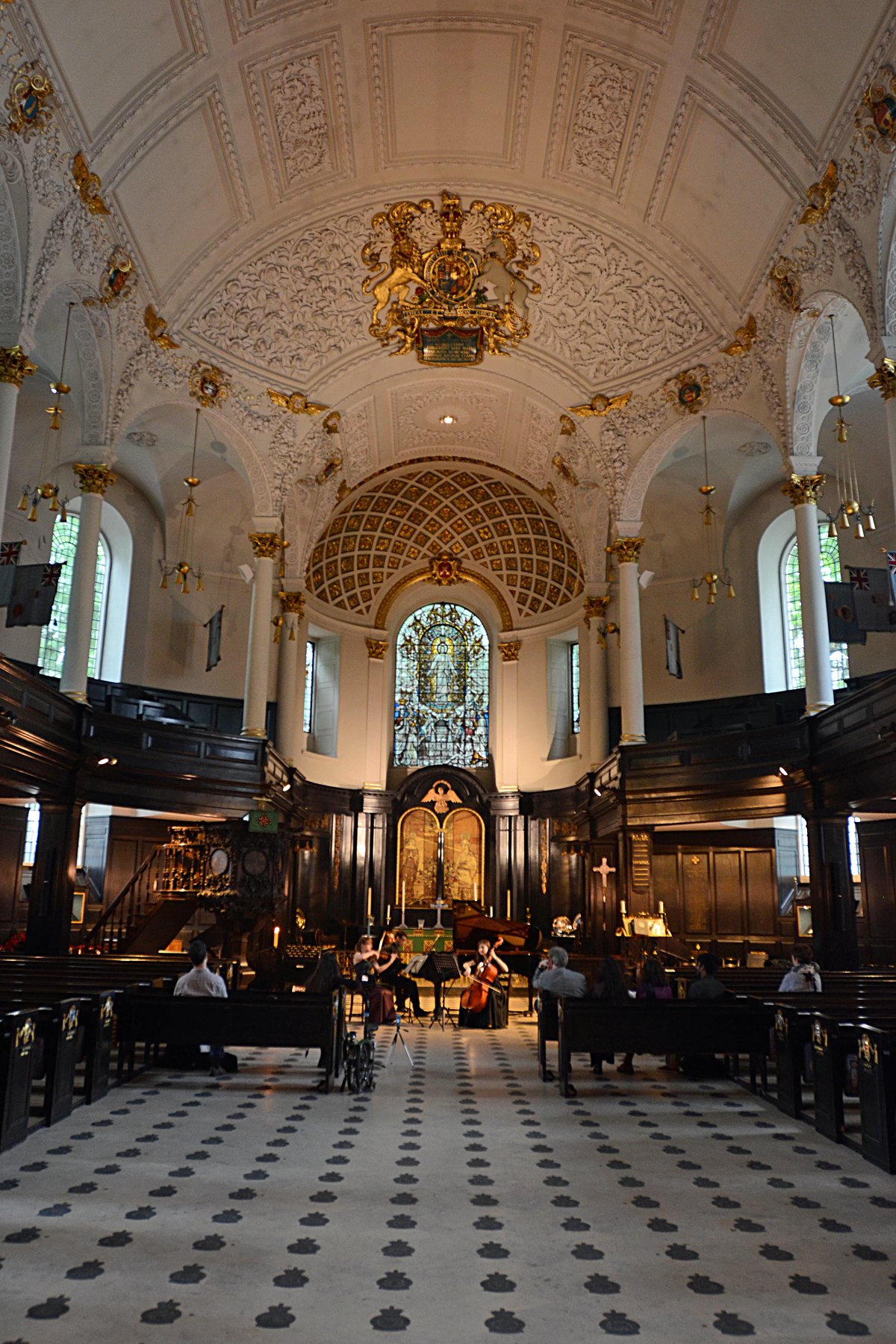
Inside St Clement Danes church. The black spots on the floor are the badges

No. 35 Squadron badge

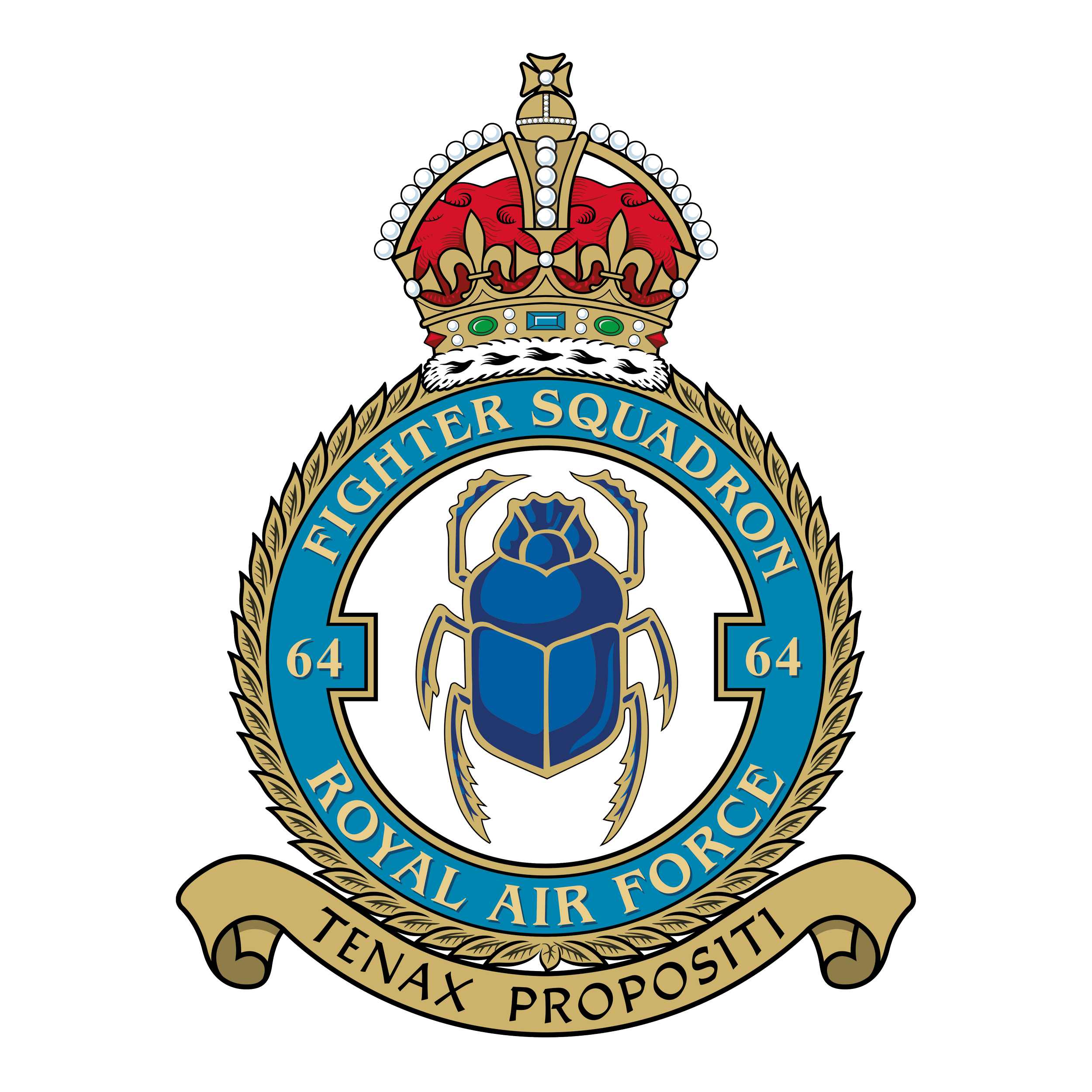
No. 64 Squadron badge

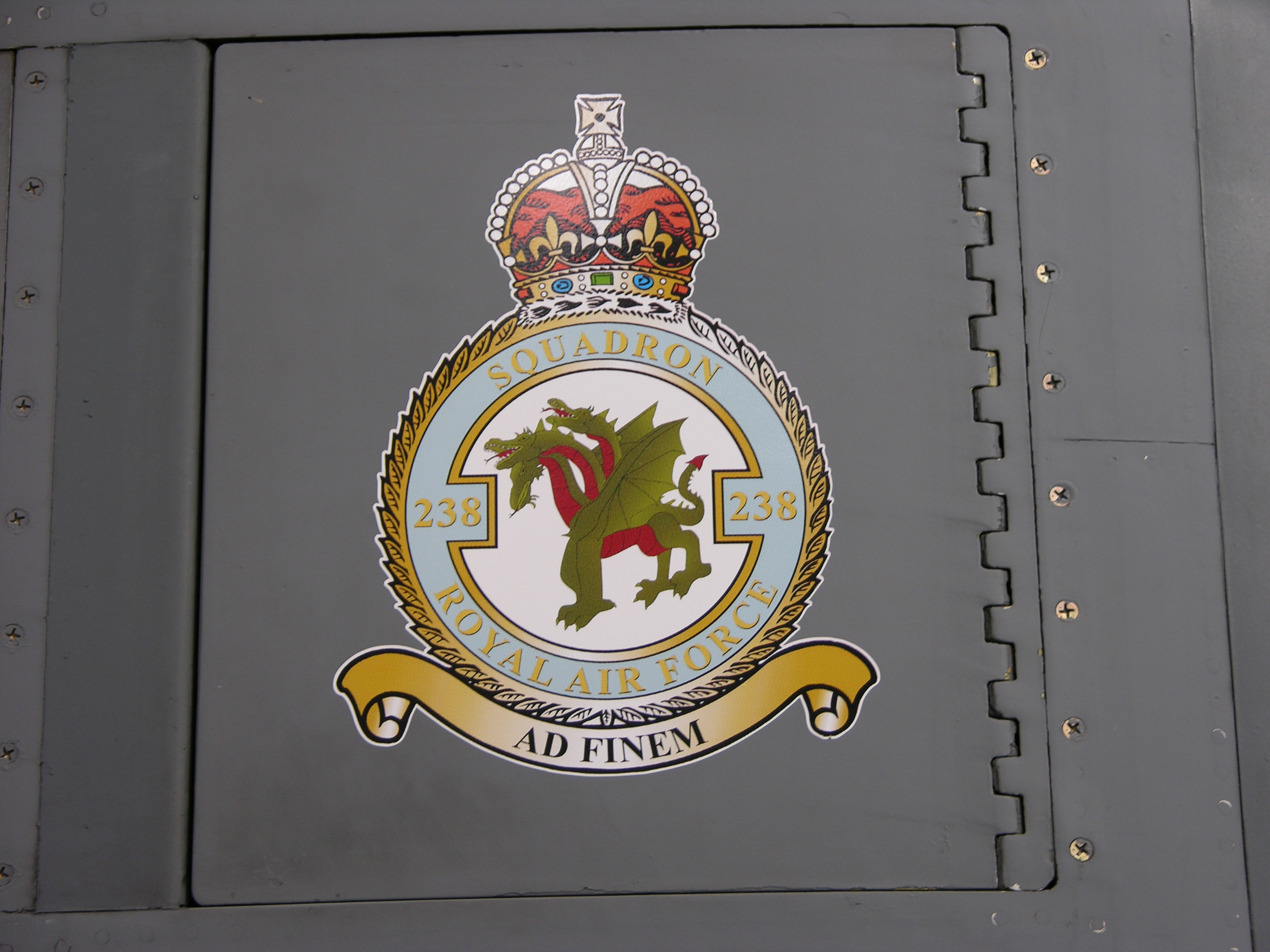
No. 238 Squadron badge
