= Exelby =

Village in North Yorkshire, England

Coordinates: 54.278229°N 1.548630°W

- Location within North Yorkshire
- OS grid reference: SE294870
  - London: 205 mi (330 km) south
- Civil parish: Exelby, Leeming and Londonderry
- Unitary authority: North Yorkshire
- Ceremonial county: North Yorkshire
- Region: Yorkshire and the Humber
- Country: England
- Sovereign state: United Kingdom
- Post town: BEDALE
- Postcode district: DL8
- Dialling code: 01677
- Police: North Yorkshire
- Fire: North Yorkshire
- Ambulance: Yorkshire
- UK Parliament: Thirsk and Malton

Exelby is a village in the county of North Yorkshire, England. It is 2 miles (3.2 km) south-east of Bedale and 0.5 miles (0.8 km) west of the A1(M) motorway and is part of the civil parish of Exelby, Leeming and Londonderry. The civil parish had a total of 2,788 residents at the time of the 2011 census, though Exelby had only 80 homes. The name of the village derives from Old Danish or Old Norse and means Eskil's farm or Eskil's settlement.

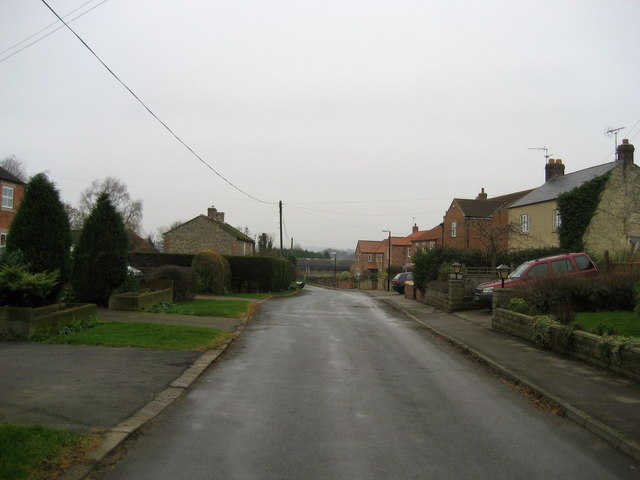
Houses in Exelby

In the 1086 Domesday Book Exelby is noted as Aschilebi, with only one man but 20 ploughlands, and in the North Riding's Land of Count Alan. In 1066 Merleswein the Sheriff was Lord of the manor, which by 1086 had been transferred to Robert of Moutiers, with Count Alan of Brittany as Tenant-in-chief.

From 1974 to 2023 it was part of the Hambleton District, it is now administered by the unitary North Yorkshire Council.

The village lies on the B6285, which connects Bedale with Exelby, Theakston, Burneston and the A6055 road just east of Burneston.

In October 2018 the residents of the village, along with other community investors, bought the closed village pub, The Green Dragon. It was revamped and renamed Exelby Green Dragon (EGD), reopening in December 2018. Since then a deli-cafe, high quality letting rooms and a lottery funded community garden (incorporating the pub garden) have been added. The pub also acts as a community hub, accommodating local groups and serving as a base for a folk club.

== See also ==
- Listed buildings in Exelby, Leeming and Londonderry
