= No. 90 Signals Unit RAF =

Communications unit of the Royal Air Force

No. 90 Signals Unit
- Unit badge
- Active: 1 April 2006 – present
- Country: United Kingdom
- Branch: Royal Air Force
- Type: Air Combat Service Support unit
- Role: Information and communication services
- Size: 900+ personnel
- Home station: RAF Leeming
- Motto: Aetherem vincere (Latin for 'Conquer the upper air')
- Website: Official website

Commanders
- Current commander: Group Captain Andrew Colley

Insignia
- Unit badge: A Royal Blue stag wearing an ethereal crown around its neck.

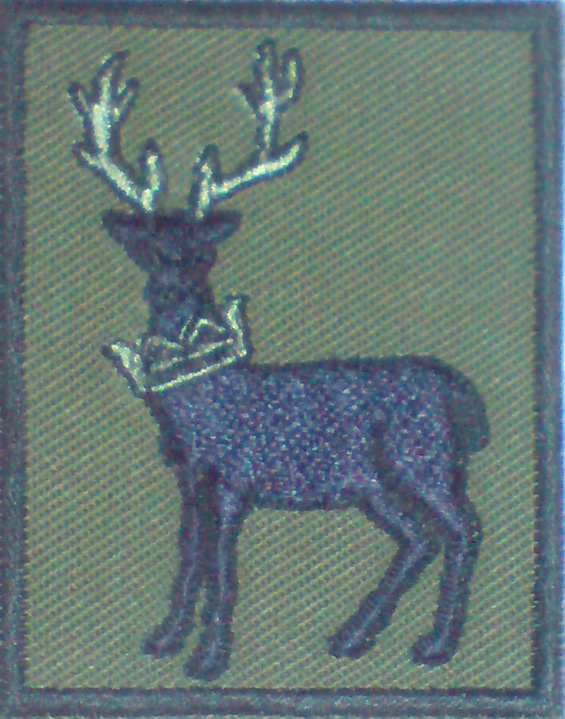
The Tactical Recognition Flash of TCW and 90 Signals Unit

90 Signals Unit (90 SU) is based at RAF Leeming, North Yorkshire and provides information and communication services to deployed units of the Royal Air Force.

== History ==
No. 90 (Signals) Group was formed on 26 April 1946 and had its headquarters at RAF Medmenham in Buckinghamshire. It combined the signals, radio and countermeasures elements of Numbers 26, 60 and 100 Groups and No. 80 Wing RAF. Its purpose was to provide ground radio engineering, telecommunications, electronic warfare and the calibration and operation of navigational aids for aircraft. The Group became RAF Signals Command in November 1958, then becoming part of Strike Command, and reverting to No. 90 (Signals) Group on 1 January 1969.

No. 90 Signals Unit was formed on 1 April 2006 under the command of a Group captain. Force elements from RAF Brize Norton, RAF High Wycombe and RAF Sealand relocated to RAF Leeming in Yorkshire between Summer 2007 and Summer 2009 as part of the creation of the A6 Communications hub.

In December 2009 No 1 Expeditionary Radar and Airfield (ERA) Squadron becoming No 1 Field Communications (FC) Squadron, with personnel from the former Squadron being incorporated into the four FC Squadrons. No 1 (ERA) Squadron's role was to deploy, support and recover a wide range of airfield sensors, navigational aids and information infrastructure worldwide. This role was then carried out by specialist teams within the field Communications squadrons. No 5 Information Systems (IS) Squadron moved under the control of 90 SU Force Generation Wing (FGW).

In February 2015, No 1 (Field Communication) Squadron was transferred to Engineering Support Squadron, FGW, becoming 1 (Engineering Support) Squadron. Additionally, the Trade Group 4 Aerial Erectors employed on the Field Communication Squadrons were centralised within the Aerial Erector Flight, FGW.

== Motto and badge ==
90SU's motto is "Aetherem Vincere" (which translates as "To conquer the upper air") and is taken from the former No. 90 (Signals) Group badge.

== Unit role ==
90SU is an Air Combat Service Support Unit that exists to "support airpower through the delivery of assured information & communication services".

== Organisational structure ==
Tactical Communications Wing
- Unit badge
- Active: 1962 (as the No. 38 Group Support Unit) – present
- Country: United Kingdom
- Branch: Royal Air Force
- Type: Air Combat Service Support unit
- Role: Deployable information and communication services
- Size: Wing
- Part of: No. 90 Signals Unit
- Home station: RAF Leeming
- Motto: Ubique loquimur (Latin for 'We speak everywhere')
- Website: Official website

Insignia
- Unit badge: A rock dove in front of a lightning bolt

The Old Tactical Recognition Flash of TCW

90 Signals Unit is commanded by a Group Captain. The Unit is split into two Wings, with a number of Squadrons carrying out various roles.

=== Operational Information Services Wing (OpISW) ===
- No 1 (Engineering Support) Sqn - responsible for the engineering support to deployable network equipment used across the Unit. The maintenance of Defence’s Navigational Aids both fixed and deployable. Providing Defence Working at Height and cable infrastructure specialists. Providing engineering support to a number of Defence’s Above Secret Systems.
- No 5 (Information Services) Sqn - responsible for building, configuring and supporting 90SU’s deployable Information Systems.
- Capability and Innovation Sqn - provides specialist technical and Information eXploitation (IX) expertise support to Air on any fielded equipment, Air Information Services (IS) application or IX issues.

=== Tactical Communications Wing (TCW) ===
TCW provides communications facilities to deployed units of the RAF

- No 1, 2, 3 and 4 Field Communications (FC) Sqns - providing deployed networks and information systems in a range of settings and locations.
- 5 Sqn provides support to the FC Sqns, through calibration and testing of equipment.

==== History ====
TCW's roots can be traced back to 1962, and the forming of 38 Group Support Unit, based at RAF Odiham. It was then quickly realised that communications played a large part in supporting operations.

In 1965 No. 50 Tactical Signals Unit was formed at RAF Tangmere and as it grew in size was renamed, in 1967 to 38 Group Tactical Signals Wing then again in 1969 to its current name, Tactical Communications Wing.

TCW has played its part in many operational theatres worldwide, including providing communications and meteorological services in the Falklands War, both Gulf Wars, Operation Granby, Operation Jenna, Operation Haven, Operation Jural, Operation Barras, Operation Phylis, Sarajevo, Nepal, Northern Ireland, Turkey, Angola, Rwanda, Operation Warden, Operation Jural, Operation Veritas and Operation Herrick.

During Operation Telic TCW provided vital communications infrastructure in support of air operations.

==== Motto and badge ====
TCW's motto is "Ubique Loquimur" which translates to "We Speak Everywhere" which was taken from No. 38 Group Tactical Communications Wing badge.

Until the amalgamation with 90 Signals Unit in 2006, TCW personnel could be distinguished by both their rank slides, embroidered with the letters 'TCW' and the Wing badge (the rock dove with lightning bolt). Upon amalgamation, the latter was replaced with that of 90 Signals Unit.

== 90SU and TCW Royal Air Forces Association Branch and Memorial ==
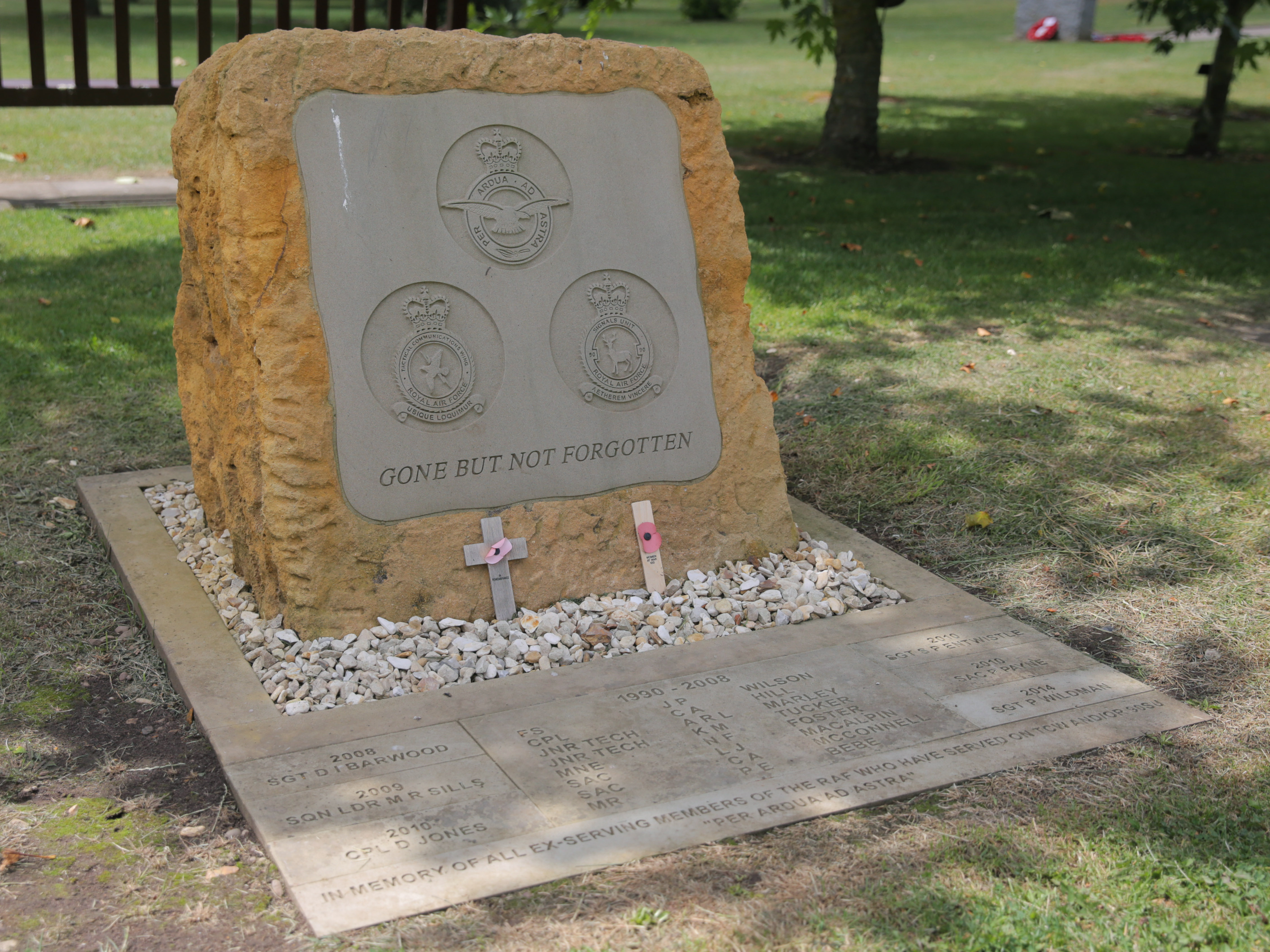
Memorial to all who have died on active service whilst being part of either Tactical Communications Wing (TCW) or 90 Signals Unit (90 SU).

Formed on 1 April 2010, the Branch was created to promote the relevance and aims of RAFA and also to be a focal point for current and ex-serving members of the Unit. To develop further the friendships and Morale they experienced whilst serving with the Unit.

Being the first virtual Branch of RAFA, this initiative paved the way for similar Branches to be formed within the Association. It created a new method of promoting RAFA and demonstrating that it has as much relevance today as the day it was formed.

The Branch is also the first to have its own website and this initiative also helps to promote the Association in a way that has previously not been possible.

The RAFA Branch will ensure that the Unit Memorial, dedicated in 2008, and located at the National Memorial Arboretum will stand as a permanent reminder to those who lost their lives whilst serving in the Royal Air Force.
