= RAF Leeming =

Royal Air Force base in Yorkshire, England

RAF Leeming
- Near Leeming, North Yorkshire in England
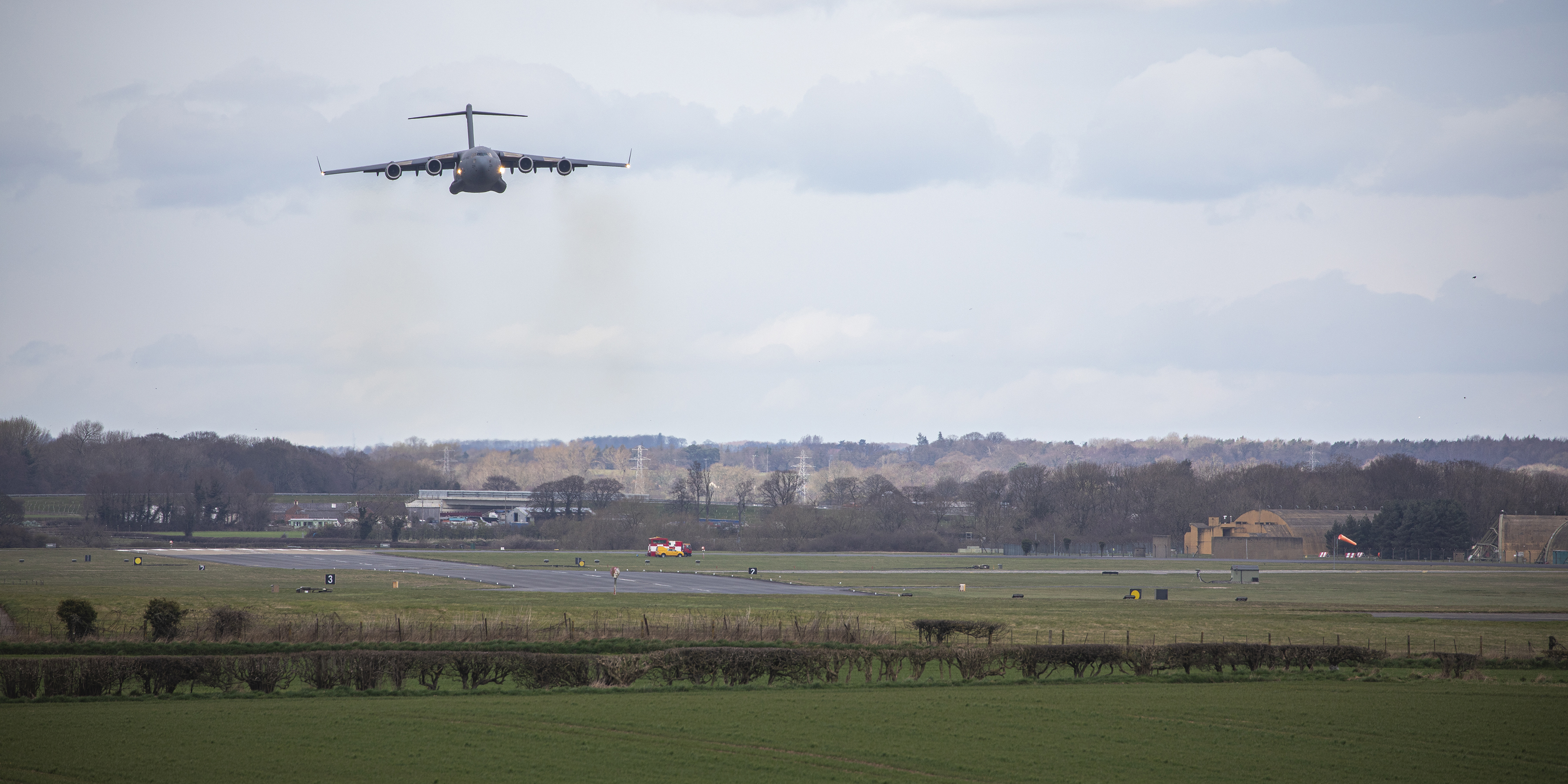
- An RAF C-17 above the runway at RAF Leeming

- Straight and True

Site information
- Type: Air combat support station
- Owner: Ministry of Defence
- Operator: Royal Air Force
- Controlled by: No. 1 Group (Air Combat)
- Condition: Operational
- Website: Official website

Location
- Shown within North Yorkshire
- Coordinates: 54°17′33″N 001°32′08″W
- Grid reference: SE305890
- Area: 508 hectares (1,260 acres)

Site history
- Built: 1939
- In use: June 1940 – present

Garrison information
- Current commander: Group Captain J. Lawson
- Occupants: No. 135 Expeditionary Air Wing; Joint Forward Air Controller Training and Standards Unit; No. 90 Signals Unit; No. 34 Squadron RAF Regiment; No. 607 Squadron (RAuxAF); No. 609 Squadron (RAuxAF Regiment); Mountain Rescue Team; See Based units section for full list.

Airfield information
- Identifiers: IATA: QXL, ICAO: EGXE, WMO: 03257
- Elevation: 40.5 metres (133 ft) AMSL
Runways
Direction	Length and surface
16/34	2,291 metres (7,516 ft) Asphalt
- Source: UK MIL AIP Leeming

Royal Air Force Leeming or more simply RAF Leeming is a Royal Air Force station located near Leeming, North Yorkshire, England. It was opened in 1940 and was jointly used by the RAF and the Royal Canadian Air Force (RCAF).

Between 1950 and 1991, it operated mostly as a training base with Quick Reaction Force (QRF) Panavia Tornado F3 fighters based there in the latter stages of the Cold War and into the early 21st century. Since 2006, it has become the home of the deployable RAF communications cadre (No. 90 Signals Unit RAF) and the home of No. 135 Expeditionary Air Wing.

== History ==
The area at the extreme western edge of the base was used in the 1930s by local flying enthusiasts. It took the name of Londonderry Aerodrome as it was closest to the hamlet of Londonderry in North Yorkshire. In the late 1930s, the Royal Air Force bought the aerodrome and most of the surrounding land to convert it into an RAF airfield, which became known as Royal Air Force Leeming. Part of the buildup of the base included building a decoy airfield at Burneston, some 4 miles (6.4 km) to the south.

=== 1940s ===
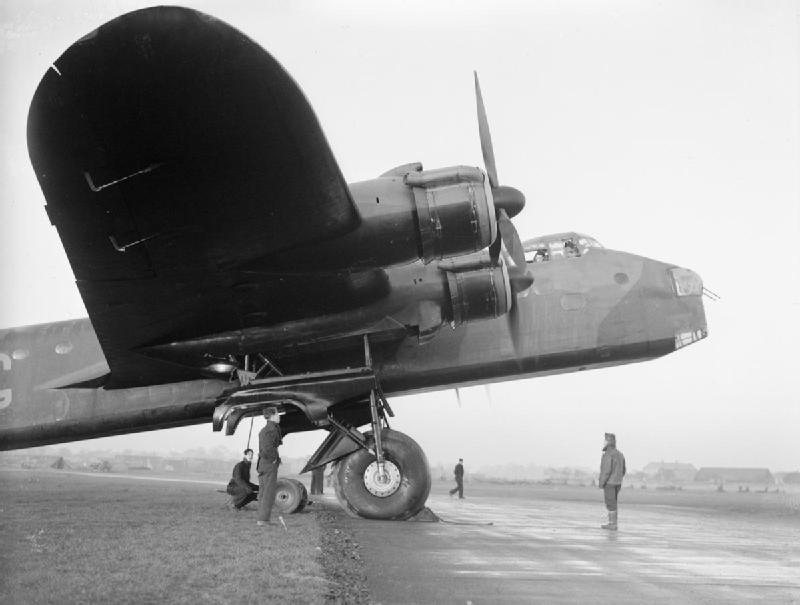
This Stirling, N3641/MG-D, seen being prepared for a flight, was the second Stirling to be delivered to No. 7 Squadron at Leeming and took part in their first raid over Rotterdam on the night of 10–11 February 1941.

The station opened in June 1940 as a bomber station during the Second World War. In 1943 the station was assigned to No. 6 Group Royal Canadian Air Force (RCAF) with a sub-station at RAF Skipton-on-Swale. The main aircraft operated were Handley Page Halifax bombers.

A detachment of No. 219 (Mysore) Squadron RAF used the airfield between 4 October 1939 and 12 October 1940 when the main section of the squadron was at RAF Catterick flying the Bristol Blenheim IF.

- No. 10 Squadron RAF between 8 July 1940 and 5 July 1942 flying the Handley Page Halifax Mks I & II.
- No. 7 Squadron RAF reformed at the airfield on 1 August 1940 with the Short Stirling I before moving to RAF Oakington on 29 October 1940.
- No. 102 (Ceylon) Squadron RAF between 25 August 1940 and 1 September 1940 flying the Armstrong Whitworth Whitley V before moving to RAF Prestwick.
- No. 35 (Madras Presidency) Squadron RAF between 20 November 1940 and 5 December 1940 using the Halifax I before moving to RAF Linton-on-Ouse.
- No. 77 Squadron RAF between 5 September 1941 and 6 May 1942 flying the Whitley V before moving to RAF Chivenor.
- No. 408 Squadron RCAF between 14 September 1942 and 27 August 1943 with the Halifax V and I before moving to RAF Linton-on-Ouse.
- 1659 HCU RAF 1941–1942
- No. 424 Squadron RCAF between 8 April 1943 and 3 May 1943 using the Vickers Wellington X before moving to RAF Dalton.
- No. 427 Squadron RCAF between 5 May 1943 and 31 May 1946 when the squadron disbanded. The squadron initially used the Halifax V and III before switching to the Avro Lancaster Mk.I and III in March 1945.
- No. 429 Squadron RCAF between 13 August 1943 and 31 May 1946 when the squadron disbanded. The squadron initially used the Halifax V and III before switching to the Lancaster Mk.I and III in March 1945.

=== 1950–1990 ===
Following the war, the station became a night-fighter base, equipped initially with de Havilland Mosquito and then Gloster Meteor and Gloster Javelin aircraft before becoming a Flying Training Command airfield in 1961. The station was then home to No. 3 Flying Training School, equipped with the BAC Jet Provost aircraft.

There were also several other units using the airfield during the same period, these were:

- 228 Operational Conversion Unit RAF 1948–1961
- No. 3 Flying Training School RAF 1961–1984
- Northumbrian Universities Air Squadron 1974–Present
- No. 11 Air Experience Flight 1980–Present

In January 1987, the airfield closed for one year to allow installation of hardened aircraft shelters (HAS). RAF Leeming became the home base for three Tornado squadrons over the next twenty years.

=== 1990–present ===
Leeming functioned as a training base until 1988 when it became a front line base in the air defence role equipped with Panavia Tornado F.3s. Its new runway was opened by Station Commander Wing Commander Kit Smith on 11 January 1988. Initially it hosted Nos 11(F), 23, and 25(F) Squadrons, all flying the F3. 23 Squadron was disbanded on 1 March 1994 and its air and ground crews dispersed across the station's remaining two squadrons. 11 Squadron was disbanded in October 2005. The last Tornado squadron at Leeming, No 25(F) Squadron, disbanded on 4 April 2008. No. 100 Squadron RAF with Hawk T.1As arrived on 21 September 1995 from RAF Finningley.

No. 135 Expeditionary Air Wing was formed at Leeming on 1 April 2006 to create a deployable air force structure. Since that time it has deployed several times for Baltic Air Policing.

The station's air traffic control unit was named the best in the Royal Air Force in February 2012, winning the Raytheon Falconer Trophy.

RAF Leeming had been host to a BAE Systems reverse assembly line process (Reduce to Produce (RTP)) programme in which redundant Tornado aircraft were brought into one of the hangars at RAF Leeming and stripped of all usable components. The process started with the F3 variant of the aircraft as it was the first to be withdrawn completely from service, and moved onto the GR4 variant later. In October 2017, it was announced that the full retirement of the Tornado aircraft from RAF service in 2019 meant that this process would end with the loss of 245 British Aerospace jobs between RAF Leeming and RAF Marham.

607 (County of Durham) Squadron reformed at RAF Leeming on 5 January 2015. The Squadron formerly flew fighter aircraft and was disbanded in 1957. The squadron is a General Service Support (GSS) unit with many diverse roles such as chef, driver, intelligence analyst and suppliers.

In March 2019, the Ministry of Defence indicated that RAF Leeming, alongside RAF Waddington and RAF Wittering, was being considered as the future home of the RAF Aerobatic Team the Red Arrows. In May 2020 however it was confirmed that the team would move to Waddington.

On 22 April 2020, the government announced that alpha testing of a prototype of the government's COVID-19 app was in progress at RAF Leeming.

On 1 December 2020, it was announced that the Yorkshire Universities Air Squadron had relocated to RAF Leeming from RAF Linton-on-Ouse as part of the latter's closure by the end of 2021.

The first of nine Hawk 167 aircraft to be operated by a newly established Joint Qatar Emiri Air Force-RAF Hawk Training Squadron arrived at Leeming in early September 2021. The squadron will train pilots from both air forces and be home to the Qatar Emiri Air Force's entire fleet of Hawks. The RAF's No. 100 Squadron, operating the Hawk T1 in the aggressor role disbanded on 31 March 2022.

== Role and operations ==
The deployable elements of the station structure form the core of an Expeditionary Air Wing, No. 135 Expeditionary Air Wing. For Exercise 'Griffin Strike 2016' in April 2016, No. 135 EAW became the combined French-British No. 135 Combined Expeditionary Air Wing.

== Based units ==
Flying and notable non-flying units based at RAF Leeming.

=== Royal Air Force ===
No. 1 Group (Air Combat) RAF

- No. 607 (County of Durham) Squadron (Royal Auxiliary Air Force)
- Joint Forward Air Control Training and Standardisation Unit (JFACTSU)

No. 2 Group (Air Combat Support) RAF

- Combat and Readiness Force
  - No. 2 Force Protection Wing
    - Headquarters No. 2 Force Protection Wing
    - No. 34 Squadron RAF Regiment
    - No. 609 (West Riding) Squadron (Royal Auxiliary Air Force) Regiment
- Support Force
  - No. 85 Expeditionary Logistics Wing
    - RAF Leeming Mountain Rescue Team
  - No. 90 Signals Unit
    - Headquarters Squadron
    - Operational Information Services Wing
      - No. 4 (Capability and Innovation) Squadron
      - No. 5 (Information Services) Squadron
    - Tactical Communications Wing
      - No. 1 (Engineering Support) Squadron
      - No. 2 Field Communications Squadron
      - No. 3 Field Communications Squadron

No. 22 Group (Training) RAF

- No. 6 Flying Training School
  - No. 9 Air Experience Flight – Tutor T1
  - No. 11 Air Experience Flight – Tutor T1
  - Northumbrian Universities Air Squadron – Tutor T1
  - Yorkshire Universities Air Squadron – Tutor T1
- Operational Training Centre
- Air Training Corps
  - North Region Headquarters

=== Qatar Emiri Air Force ===
- 11 Squadron – Hawk Mk.167

=== Civilian ===
- Hawker Hunter Aviation – Hawker Hunter Mk 58 and T7/8

== Accidents and incidents ==
- 21 February 1944 – a RCAF Halifax, LV836, of No. 427 Sqn crashed into farmland at Romanby, creating a fireball and killing all seven crew on impact. The aircraft had left RAF Leeming nine minutes earlier, at 00:15, on a bombing mission to Stuttgart. On 10 March 2010 a memorial to the crew was unveiled at the crash site, which is now part of Romanby Golf & Country Club.
- 13 August 1951 – two aircraft from RAF Leeming collided over Hudswell, near to Richmond, North Yorkshire. A cadet in the No. 228 Operational Conversion Unit Wellington aircraft was given the only serviceable parachute by Flight Lieutenant John Quinton, shown how to operate it and ordered to bale out. The other eight crew members of both aircraft died when their aircraft hit the ground.
- 22 October 1999 – a 100 Sqn Hawk struck a bridge and crashed into an unoccupied building near the village of Shap, killing the pilot and navigator. The RAF Board of Inquiry suggested that aircrew fatigue may have contributed to the accident. A jury returned a verdict of accidental death.
- 28 January 2016 – during a training sortie, the pilot of a 100 Sqn Hawk experienced partial loss of vision. The base commander considered instructing the pilot to eject over the North Sea, but instead scrambled another Hawk, flown by an instructor. The two aircraft flew in formation to Leeming, and conducted a successful talk down landing.

== Heritage ==
=== Station badge ===
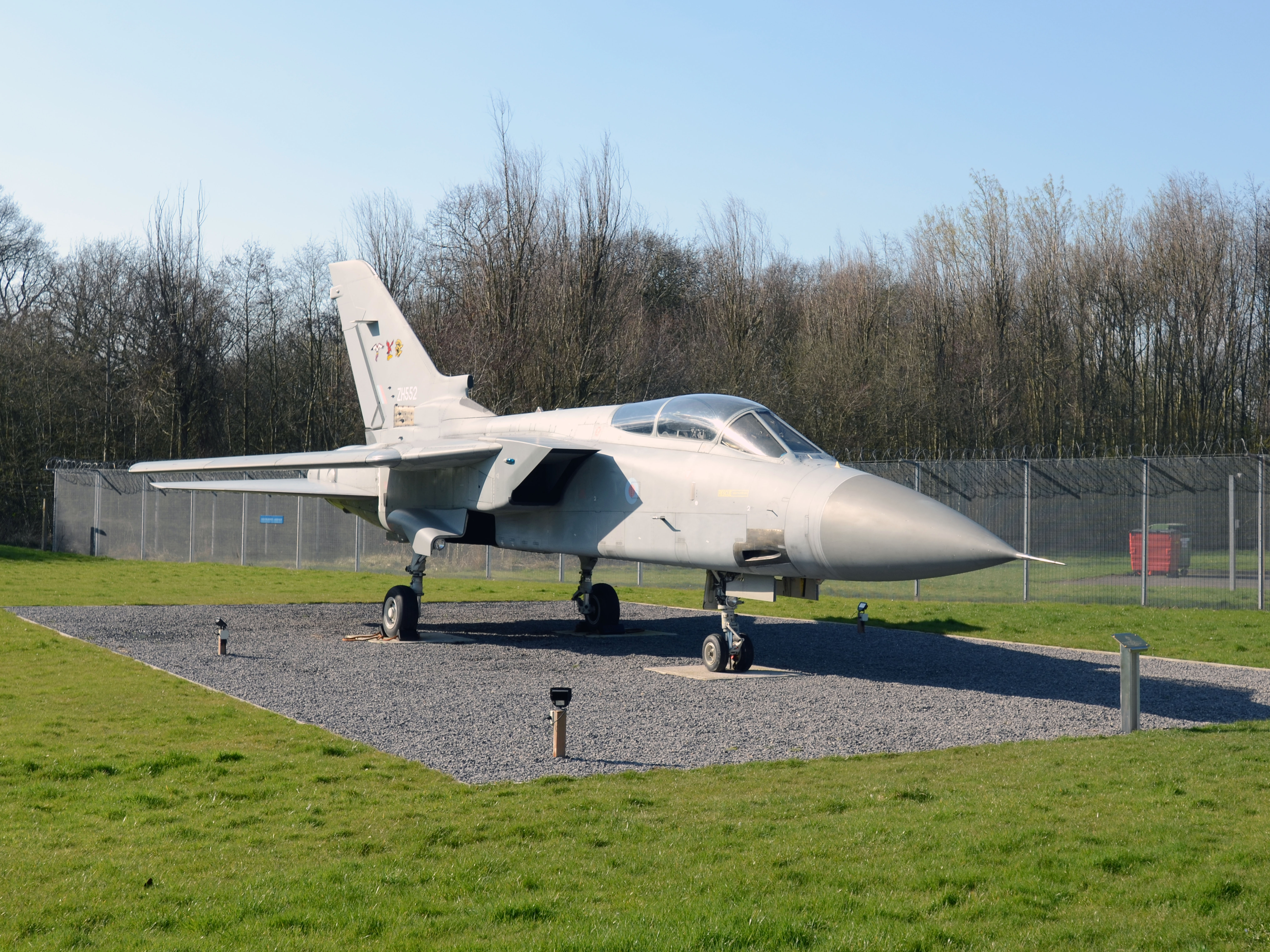
A Tornado F3 stands as a gate guardian outside the main gate, RAF Leeming

The station badge was awarded in April 1942 and shows a "sword erect point uppermost Gules hilted Argent". The sword reflects the fighting spirit of the station, and the motto is Straight and True.

=== Gate Guardian ===
Leeming's gate guardian is now a Tornado F3, commemorating its history as an air defence base, and the fact that many Tornados were scrapped/Reduced To Produce here. The previous gate guardian XA634 is the world's only surviving Gloster Javelin FAW4, which spent most of its life as a testbed at the Gloster Aircraft Company and was offered for sale by tender in September 2014 by the Ministry of Defence. In December 2014 it was announced that Gloucestershire Jet Age Museum had won the tender and purchased the aircraft.

== See also ==
- List of Royal Air Force stations
