= Listed buildings in Exelby, Leeming and Londonderry =

Exelby, Leeming and Londonderry is a civil parish in the county of North Yorkshire, England. It contains 15 listed buildings that are recorded in the National Heritage List for England. All the listed buildings are designated at Grade II, the lowest of the three grades, which is applied to "buildings of national importance and special interest". The parish contains the villages of Exelby, Leeming and Londonderry, and the surrounding countryside. Most of the listed buildings consist of houses, farmhouses and farm buildings, and the others include a bridge, a church and a water pump.

== Buildings ==
Name and location	Photograph	Date	Notes
19 and 21 Roman Road, Leeming; 54.29980°N 1.54918°W	—	Mid 18th century	Two houses in red brick with a tile roof. There are two storeys and five bays. On the front are two porches and doorways with fanlights, and the windows are sashes. All the openings have flat brick arches.
Exelby Lodge Cottage and Lodge Cottage; 54.27699°N 1.55105°W	—	Mid 18th century	Four cottages, later two houses, in red brick on a chamfered plinth, with dentilled eaves, and a pantile roof with moulded stone coping and shaped kneelers. There are two storeys, four bays and a continuous rear outshut. On the front are two doorways, and the windows are casements.
Fairfield; 54.27694°N 1.55337°W	—	Mid 18th century	The house is in red brick with a floor band, a stepped and dentilled eaves band, and a tile roof with stone coping. There are two storeys and three bays, the right bay later and taller. The windows are sashes, those in the right bay horizontally-sliding, and all the openings have flat brick arches.
Londonderry Lodge; 54.28494°N 1.53699°W		Mid 18th century	A house, later used for other purposes, in whitewashed red brick, with dentilled eaves, and a stone slate roof with stone coping and shaped kneelers. There are two storeys and four bays. The windows are sashes, those in the ground floor with stuccoed flat arches and voussoirs, and those in the upper floor with flat brick arches. On the left return is a semicircular bow window with a frieze, a cornice and a lead half-domed roof.
Orchard House; 54.27717°N 1.55135°W	—	Mid 18th century	The house is in red brick on a plinth, with a floor band, and a tile roof with stone coping and shaped kneelers. There are two storeys and two bays. The doorway has a flush architrave, and the windows are casements.
17 Roman Road, Leeming; 54.29995°N 1.54919°W	—	Late 18th century	A farmhouse in red brick with stepped eaves and a hipped pantile roof. There are two storeys and two bays. The doorway has a fanlight, and the windows are sashes.
Bromaking Grange; 54.28545°N 1.55793°W		Late 18th century	A farmhouse in red brick, with stepped eaves, and a tile roof with stone coping and shaped kneelers. There are two storeys and two bays. In the centre is a doorway with a fanlight, and the windows are casements with flat brick arches.
Barn left of Bromaking Grange; 54.28559°N 1.55807°W		Late 18th century	The barn is in red brick with pilasters, stepped eaves, and a tile roof with brick coping. It contains a central wagon door and a board door, each under a relieving arch, and vents in a diamond pattern. In the left gable is a dovecote.
Clapham Lodge; 54.29068°N 1.54223°W		Late 18th century	A farmhouse in rendered brick, with a hipped stone slate roof. There are two storeys, and fronts of two and four bays. The doorway has a fanlight, the windows are sashes and in the left return is a full height canted bay window.
Leeming Bridge; 54.30190°N 1.55072°W		Late 18th century	The bridge carries Roman Road over Bedale Beck. It is in stone and consists of a single segmental arch with voussoirs. The bridge has a band and a coped parapet.
Littlecroft; 54.28406°N 1.53633°W	—	Early 19th century	The house is in red brick, with stepped eaves, and a Welsh slate roof with stone coping and shaped kneelers. There are two storeys and three bays. In the centre is a round-headed doorway with an architrave and a radial fanlight. The windows are sashes with flat brick arches.
Lilac Cottage; 54.28418°N 1.53644°W	—	c. 1830	The cottage is in rendered brick, with dressings in yellow brick and stone, and a slate roof with overhanging eaves and terracotta ridge tiles. There are two storeys and three bays. The central doorway has a chamfered surround, a four-centred arch, and a gabled porch with decorative bargeboards. The windows have two lights, chamfered mullions, casement windows with latticed glazing, and hood moulds.
Cowfold Grange; 54.29174°N 1.55173°W	—	1832	A farmhouse in red brick on a stone plinth, with dentilled eaves, and a stone slate roof with stone coping and shaped kneelers. There are two storeys and three bays. The doorway has pilasters on plinths, consoles, a frieze and an open pediment. The windows are sashes with flat brick arches.
St John the Baptist's Church, Leeming; 54.29871°N 1.55052°W		1839	The church was designed by Ignatius Bonomi, and extended in 1911. It is in red brick with stone dressings and a tile roof. The church consists of a nave, a chancel with a north vestry, and a west tower. The tower has three stages, diagonal buttresses, a doorway with a pointed arch, a chamfered surround and a hood mould, two-light bell openings, and an embattled parapet with corner pinnacles.
Pump opposite Littlecroft; 54.28380°N 1.53649°W	—	Mid 19th century	The pump is in cast iron. It consists of a fluted tapered Doric column with a shallow conical cap. The spout is half-way down the column, and the handle is on the right-hand side, with a turned end in the form of a shepherd's crook.
