= St Michael's Church, Hudswell =

Church building in Hudswell, North Yorkshire, England

Coordinates: 54°23′57″N 1°47′04″W

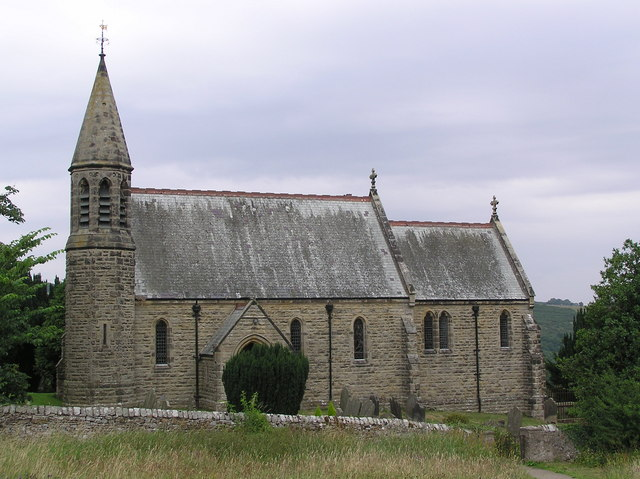
The church, in 2006

St Michael's Church is a redundant Anglican church in Hudswell, North Yorkshire, a village in England.

A church was built on the site, in or before the 13th century. It was rebuilt in the early 18th century, and again in 1884 to a design by George Wheelhouse. On opening, it could seat 150 worshippers. The building was grade II listed in 1969. The church closed in 2017, and was purchased by the Hudswell Community Charity, which converted it into a hostel, with six en-suite bedrooms, a lounge and dining area, and kitchen.

The church is built of sandstone with a Welsh slate roof. It consists of a nave, a south porch, a chancel with a north vestry, and a southwest octagonal steeple. Over the doorway is a carved head, and inside the porch are three medieval grave covers. The east window has three trefoiled lights and a sexfoil above, and the other windows are lancets. Inside, there are a piscina and stoup from the Mediaeval church, while there is an arch-braced king post roof. As part of the conversion to a hostel, a mezzanine floor was inserted.

== See also ==
- Listed buildings in Hudswell, North Yorkshire
