= St John the Baptist's Church, Leeming =

Anglican church in North Yorkshire, England

Coordinates: 54.2987°N 1.5505°W

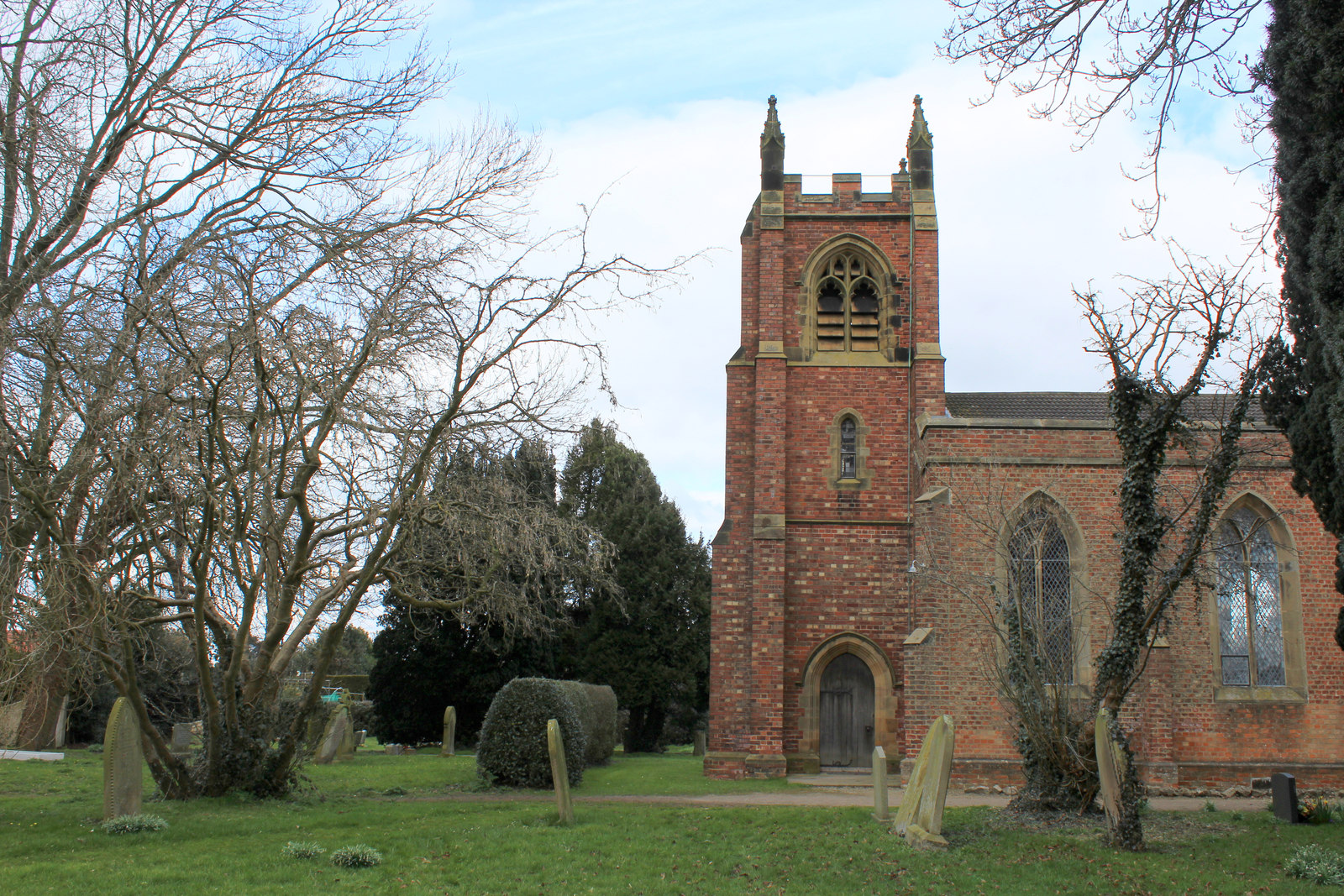
The church, in 2016

St John the Baptist's Church is an Anglican church in Leeming, North Yorkshire, a village in England.

A chapel was first constructed in Leeming in 1424, with a bequest from a traveller who had fallen ill in the village. It survived the English Reformation by becoming a chapel of ease to St Lambert's Church, Burneston, but was ruined by 1838. In 1839, a new church was constructed on the same site, to a design by Ignatius Bonomi. A tower was added in 1910, and the building was grade II listed in 1986.

The church is built of red brick with stone dressings and a tile roof. It consists of a nave, a chancel with a north vestry, and a west tower. The tower has three stages, diagonal buttresses, a doorway with a pointed arch, a chamfered surround and a hood mould, two-light bell openings, and an embattled parapet with corner pinnacles.

== See also ==
- Listed buildings in Exelby, Leeming and Londonderry
