= Londonderry, North Yorkshire =

Village in North Yorkshire, England

Coordinates: 54.284793°N 1.532706°W

Londonderry
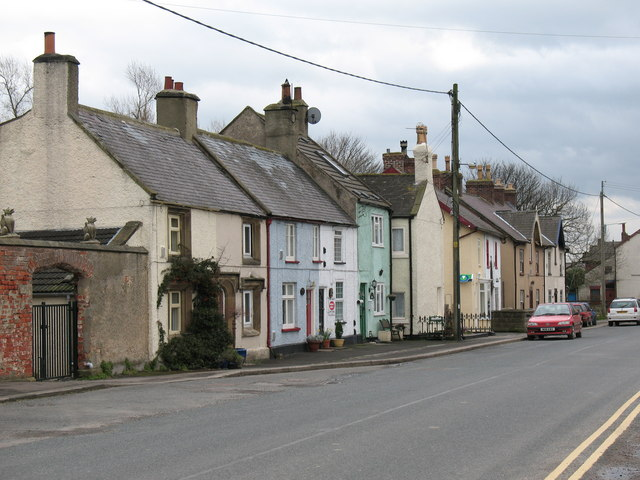
- Village street in Londonderry

- Location within North Yorkshire
- Civil parish: Exelby, Leeming and Londonderry
- Unitary authority: North Yorkshire
- Ceremonial county: North Yorkshire
- Region: Yorkshire and the Humber
- Country: England
- Sovereign state: United Kingdom
- Post town: NORTHALLERTON
- Postcode district: DL7
- Dialling code: 01677
- Police: North Yorkshire
- Fire: North Yorkshire
- Ambulance: Yorkshire
- UK Parliament: Richmond and Northallerton

Londonderry is a village near the Yorkshire Dales, England situated 4 miles (6 kilometres) south-east of Bedale, almost on the A1 road. It is in the historic North Riding of Yorkshire. From 1974 to 2023 it was part of the Hambleton District, it is now administered by the unitary North Yorkshire Council.

It is named after the Marquesses of Londonderry, who took their name from County Londonderry, now in Northern Ireland, and were colliery owners in this area of England.

Londonderry Lodge was a former Transport Café in the village. The café is now closed, having served the traffic on the A1 road for 100 years. The building has been listed as Grade II since 1966. With the upgrading of the A1 to A1(M) standard, the junction with the A1 was diverted away from Londonderry (with even the new service road, the A6055, taking a route west of the new road as opposed to going through the hamlet). As a consequence of this, traffic has been lost from the hamlet, lorry traffic especially so. A noted refuelling service station have moved their business from Londonderry to Leeming Bar because of this traffic shift.

== See also ==
- Listed buildings in Exelby, Leeming and Londonderry
