= Hudswell, North Yorkshire =

Village and civil parish in North Yorkshire, England

Coordinates: 54°23′50″N 1°46′36″W

Hudswell
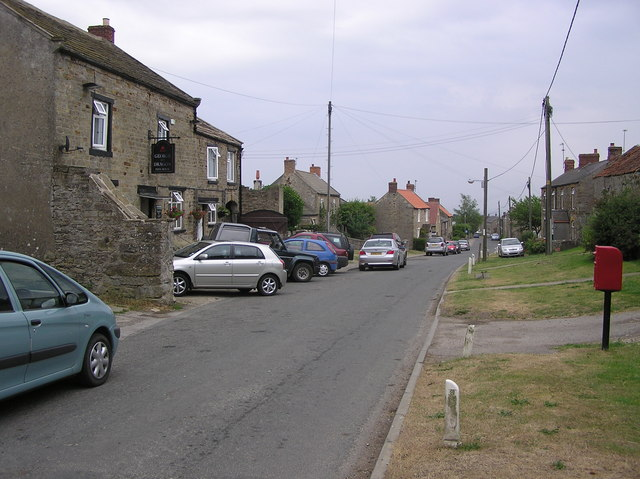
- Hudswell

- Location within North Yorkshire
- Population: 353 (including Downholme, Easby and Stainton. 2011)
- OS grid reference: NZ144002
- Unitary authority: North Yorkshire
- Ceremonial county: North Yorkshire
- Region: Yorkshire and the Humber
- Country: England
- Sovereign state: United Kingdom
- Post town: RICHMOND
- Postcode district: DL11
- Police: North Yorkshire
- Fire: North Yorkshire
- Ambulance: Yorkshire

Hudswell is a village and civil parish on the border of the Yorkshire Dales, in North Yorkshire, England. The population at the ONS Census 2011 was 353.

It lies approximately 2 miles west of Richmond, its nearest town, 3 miles north-west of Catterick Garrison and 12 1/2 miles south-west of Darlington. The village public house, George & Dragon, closed in 2008 and re-opened in 2010 as a "community-owned" public house.

Hudswell lies just south of the River Swale and the A6108, which runs through nearby Richmond. It takes the form of a 'Roadside Village', described as "...merely a string of buildings – houses, shops, inns and others – standing more or less indiscriminately" in The Anatomy of the village by Thomas Wilfred Sharp.

According to the 2011 census, Hudswell has a population of 353 and 152 households. The civil parish of Hudswell contains the hamlet of Brokes, 1.5 miles (2.4 km) to the south.

== History ==
The name Hudswell probably means Hudel's spring from the Old English name of Hudel and the Old English word of Wella meaning spring or stream.

Hudswell is mentioned in the Domesday Book, completed in 1086 for William the Conqueror. The land was valued at £0.8 in 1066 and taxed at 6 Geld units (quite a large tax compared to other Domesday settlements). In 1086 the Tenant-in-chief for the village, and for the wider administrational district was Count Alan of Brittany, and the Lord; Enisant Musard.

In 1881 the population of Hudswell was 181. By 1891, the population had increased to 223. Between 1891 and 1911, the population decreased, to 209 in 1901 and finally 185 in 1911. By 1931, the population had rapidly increased to 294, where the population remained steady (barring the years of the Second World War where no official 1941 census was produced), and by 1961, the population had grown to 303.

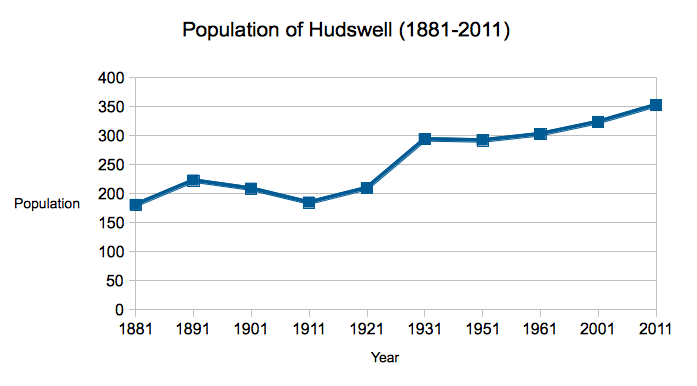
Population of Hudswell, North Yorkshire (1881–2011) Taken from national census data.

In the 1870s, John Marius Wilson's Imperial Gazetteer of England and Wales described Hudswell like this:

"Hudswell, a township and chapelry in Catterick parish, N. R. Yorkshire; on the river Swale, 2½ miles WSW of Richmond r. station. It includes the hamlet of Thorpe-under-Stone; and its post town is Richmond, Yorkshire. Acres, 2, 831. Real property, £2, 400. Pop., 249. Houses, 56. The property is divided among a few. Coal and lead ore are worked. The living is a p. curacy in the diocese of Ripon. Value, £90.* Patron, the Vicar of Catterick. The church is good; and there are a national school with £18 from endowment, and charities with £22."

From 1974 to 2023 it was part of the district of Richmondshire. It is now administered by the unitary North Yorkshire Council.

== Demographics ==
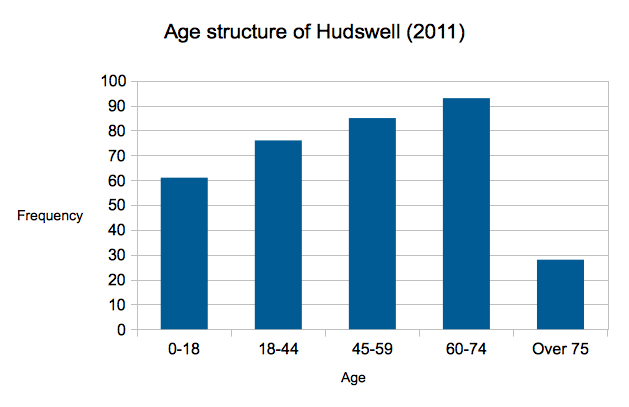
Age structure of Hudswell, North Yorkshire (2011)

According to the 2011 census, the population of Hudswell is 353; divided between 169 males and 184 females. 17.3% of the population was aged 0 to 17; 24.3% aged 18 to 44; 24.1% aged 45 to 59; The largest age group was between 60 and 74 with 26.3% and 7.9% aged 75 and over.

Similarly to many rural parts of England, the largest ethnic group in Hudswell is White, with 350 (99.2%) of the population; the other ethnic groups in the village are 0.3% mixed White/Asian and 0.6% Black. The large majority of the population were born in the United Kingdom; 93.3%, 2% born in Scotland, 0.6% in Northern Ireland and 0.3% in Wales. 1.7% of the population were born in other European Union countries and 0.8% born outside the EU.

== Health and education ==
There are three primary schools within 2 miles of Hudswell, these include Richmond Church of England Primary School, Catterick Garrison, Carnagill Community Primary School and Wavell Community Junior School, also in Catterick Garrison. The local secondary schools are Richmond School, Risedale Sports and Community College and St Francis Xavier School.

The nearest hospital to Hudswell is the Duchess of Kent Hospital, 3 miles (5 km) away in Catterick Garrison.

== Transport ==
Hudswell is served by two bus routes, the number 32; circulating between Hudswell, Richmond, Catterick Garrison and nearby villages of Scotton, Harrogate, Tunstall and Brompton-on-Swale, and the 478R school bus service.

Until the late 1960s the nearest railway station was the Richmond railway station, the terminus of the now closed Eryholme-Richmond branch line. However, the station closed in March 1969. Today the nearest railway station to Hudswell is 16 miles (26 km) away in Darlington.

== Places of interest ==
=== The George & Dragon Pub ===
The George & Dragon is the only public house in Hudswell and the first community owned public house in North Yorkshire. After the closure of the original George & Dragon in August 2008, the Hudswell Community Pub Limited (HCP Ltd) successfully led a campaign to purchase the property and reopen it as a community owned public house.

In February 2010, the community lead organisation purchased the property and land for £209,950. Investment from locals of almost £240,000 and a grant of £65,000 allowed for full renovations to be undertaken. On 12 June 2010, after nearly two years of closure and three months of renovations, the George & Dragon was officially reopened by foreign secretary and Richmond MP William Hague who is also a member of the HCP Ltd.

The George & Dragon has approximately an acre of gardens, with views of the Swale valley, serving ales from local suppliers. The pub has been designated as a hub of the village, prior to its reopening, the village hall was the only other community space in Hudswell. As well as acting as a meeting place and venue for village events, the George & Dragon hosts the village library, with books provided by North Yorkshire Council's library service, free internet and allotments for the community. The George & Dragon is also the venue for 'The Little Shop', the first shop in Hudswell for 30 years, offering local produce and basic amenities and is run by volunteers.

In May 2012, The Guardian's Northern Editor, Martin Wainwright voted The George & Dragon in the Top 10 pubs in North Yorkshire and in March 2017, CAMRA announced that The George & Dragon had won its 2016 National Pub of the Year competition.

=== St Michael and All Angels ===
St Michael's Church, Hudswell, situated to the west of the village, was built in 1884, and served Hudswell and the outlying farms. It is the sister church of St Mary's, Richmond. It closed in 2017 and has been converted into a hostel for walkers and cyclists.

== See also ==
- Listed buildings in Hudswell, North Yorkshire
