= Sampford =

Sampford could refer to:

- Sampford Arundel, Somerset
- Sampford Brett, Somerset
- Sampford Courtenay, Devon
- Sampford Peverell, Devon
- Sampford Spiney, Devon
- Great Sampford and Little Sampford, Essex
- RAF Great Sampford, a military airfield in Essex
