= List of RAF Regiment units =

Regiment Units In The Royal Air Force

This is a list of units of the Royal Air Force Regiment. The RAF Regiment is the ground fighting force of the Royal Air Force and is charged mainly with protecting military airfields, among other duties.

First formed in 1942 to protect the airfields against enemy attack, the regiment's motto is Per Ardua - Through Adversity. They are also known as Rock Apes.

== Current field squadrons ==
Squadron	Dates	Locations	Notes
No. 1 Squadron	1921 -	Honington	
No. II Squadron	1922 -	Brize Norton	
No. 15 Squadron	1946 - 1990 Unknown -	Marham	
No. 34 Squadron	1951 -	Leeming	C-UAS role
No. 51 Squadron	1947 - 1957 1964 - 1993 2001 -	Lossiemouth	
No. 63 Squadron (King's Colour Squadron)	1960 -	Northolt (ceremonial in London)	

== Current RAuxAF Regiment squadrons ==
Squadron	Dates	Locations	Notes
2503 (County of Lincoln)	1 July 1979 -	Waddington	
2620 (County of Norfolk)	1 March 1983 -	Marham	
2622 (Highland)	1 July 1979 -	Lossiemouth	
2623 (East Anglian)	1 July 1979 -	Honington	
2624 (County of Oxford)	1 November 1982 -	Brize Norton	

== Disbanded units ==
=== Wings ===
Wing	Years active	HQ Locations	Notes
1 Wing RAF Regiment	21 August 1947 - 30 September 1957	Hamburg, Fassberg, Gutersloh	
2 Wing RAF Regiment	1 January 1948 - 16 March 1951 9 July 1951 - 1 January 1958	Upavon Yatesbury, Uetersen, Wildenrath	
3 Wing RAF Regiment	20 August 1951 - 1 October 1992	El Hamra, Nicosia, Akrotiri, Catterick, Op Corporate, Op Granby	
4 Wing RAF Regiment	21 August 1947 - 30 September 1957 3 December 1973 - 1993	Celle, Luneberg, Jever, Laarbruch, Oldenburg Catterick, Bruggen, Wildernrath, Op Corporate, Op Desert Storm	
5 Wing RAF Regiment	10 September 1951 - 1 January 1964 1 April 1967 - 31 July 1990	Yatesbury, El Hamra, Habbaniya, Mafraq, Nicosia, Akrotiri, Nicosia Bicester, Wittering, Hullavington	
6 Wing RAF Regiment	21 August 1947 - 30 September 1957 1 July 1983 - 1992	Gatow, Wahn, Celle West Raynham, Op Desert Storm	
7 Wing RAF Regiment	1 October 1951 - 30 September 1957	Yatesbury, Wunstorf	
8 Wing RAF Regiment	12 November 1951- 16 November 1960	Yatesbury, Elhamra, Kasafareet, Abu Sueir, Nicosia	
9 Wing RAF Regiment	1 September 1951 - September 1953	El Hamra, Shallufa	
16 Wing RAF Regiment	21 August 1947 - 1 January 1958	Gutersloh, Sundern, Gutersloh, Laarbruch	
19 Wing RAF Regiment	8 June 1947 - 20 July 1953 15 September 1953 - 15 June 1957	Ramleh, Amman Kabrit, Amman, Mafraq, Habbaniya	
20 Wing RAF Regiment	8 June 1947 - 30 June 1957	Ein Sheimer, Khormaksar	
21 Wing RAF Regiment	1 January 1952 - 10 October 1953	Pembrey, Ouston; RAF Thornaby	
25 Wing RAF Regiment	9 June 1952 - 1 January 1958	Hawarden, Luneburg, Geilenkirchen	
33 Wing RAF Regiment	20 October 1952 - 1 October 1992	Innsworth, Felixstowe, Upwood, Catterick, Wildenrath, Laarbruch, Gutersloh, Op Granby	
38 Wing RAF Regiment	8 September 1952 - 31 May 1957	Hawarden, Luneburg, Wahn	
51 Wing RAF Regiment	Unknown - 1 January 1956	Unk	Absorbed by 4 Wing
55 Wing RAF Regiment	21 July 1952 - 1 January 1958	Hawarden, Luneburg, Bruggen	
500 Wing RAF Regiment	September - October 1943	Hadera	
1300 (Mobile) Wing RAF Regiment 1300 Wing RAF Regiment	1 April 1944 - 15 February 1945 1 October 1945 - 21 August 1947	UK, Normandy (8 June 1944), St Andre, Beauvais, Vitry, Grimbergen, Deurne, Volkel Altona (December 1945), Bad Eilsen, Buckeburg	Became 1 Wing
1301 Wing RAF Regiment	April 1944 - June 1946	UK, Normandy (15 June 1944), Martragny, Ellon, Evreaux, Evere, Eindhoven, Schleswig Holstein, Eggebek	
1302 Wing RAF Regiment	April 1944 - March 1946	Normandy (8 June 1944), Grange-sur-Mer, La Baronnie, St Croix, Melsbroek, Eindhoven, Wilhelmina Canal, Lubeck	
1303 Wing RAF Regiment	April 1944 - April 1946	Normandy (15 June 1944), Lantheuil, Longues, Douai, Deurne, Grave, List, Sylt	
1304 (Mobile) Wing RAF Regiment 1304 Wing RAF Regiment	1 April 1944 - 15 April 1945 1 October 1945 - 21 August 1947	UK, Normandy (7 June 1944), La Valette, St Croix, Carpiquet, Beauvais, Melsbroek, Eindhoven Celle (December 1945)	Became 4 Wing
1305 Wing RAF Regiment	April 1944 - January 1946	UK, Normandy (7 June 1944), Bazenville, Cristot, St Andre, Volkel, Eggebek	
1306 (Mobile) Wing RAF Regiment 1306 Wing RAF Regiment	1 April 1944 - 15 February 1945 1 October 1945 - 21 August 1947	UK, Normandy (16 June 1944), Plumelot, Volkel, Heesch Gatow (September 1946)	Became 6 Wing
1307 Mobile Wing RAF Regiment		RAF Westhampnett	
1307 Wing RAF Regiment	April 1944 - March 1946	UK, Normandy (17 June 1944), Longues, Vitry, Bombay, Ondauk, Meiktila, Toungoo, Pegu, Saigon	
1308 Wing RAF Regiment	April 1944 - April 1946	UK, Normandy (17 June 1944), Bombay, Chittagong, Maungdaw, Java (October 1945), Batavia, Tanah Tinggi	
1309 Wing RAF Regiment	April 1944 - February 1945	UK, Normandy (8 June 1944), Courselles, Graye, Beny, Grave, Helmond	
1310 Wing RAF Regiment	June 1944 - April 1946	UK, Normandy (August 1944)	
1311 Wing RAF Regiment	June 1944 - September 1946	UK, Normandy (August 1944), Beny, Deurne, Gilze Rijen, Delmenhorst	
1312 Wing RAF Regiment	June 1944 - January 1945	UK, Normandy (August 1945), Plumelot, Deurne, Grimbergen	
1313 Wing RAF Regiment	June 1944 - September 1946	UK, Normandy (August 1944), Wilhelmina Canal, Gutersloh	
1314 Wing RAF Regiment	June 1944 - December 1946	UK, Normandy (August 1944), Sommervieu, Carpiquet, Brionne, Courtrai, Deurne, RAF Coolham	
1315 Wing RAF Regiment	June 1944 - April 1946	UK, Normandy (August 1944), Rouen, Damme, Maele, Capelle, Leopold Canal, Moerkerke, Knokke, Wahn	
1316 (Mobile) Wing RAF Regiment 1316 Wing RAF Regiment	1 April 1944 - 15 February 1945 1 October 1945 - 21 August 1947	UK, Normandy (August 1944), Grange, Carpiquet, Merville, Maldegem, Evere Sundern (December 1945)	Became 16 Wing
1317 Wing RAF Regiment	June 1944 - July 1946	UK, Normandy (July 1944), Glisy, Grimbergen, Deurne, Gatow	
1318 Wing RAF Regiment	June 1944 - July 1945	UK, Normandy (8 June 1944), St Croix, Deurne, UK, Norway, Oslo, Forus, Kjeller, Gardemoen, Bardufoss, Tromso, Oslo	
1319 Wing RAF Regiment	March 1944 - June 1946	Trigno, Vasto, San Servero, San Vito, Pescara, Falconara, Santarcangelo, Palestine (December 1945), Ramleh	Became 19 Wing
1320 Wing RAF Regiment	March 1944 - March 1946	Bellavista, Orvieto, Iese, Fano, Rimini, Austria (May 1945), Klagenfurt, Palestine, Ein Shemer	Became 20 Wing
1321 Wing RAF Regiment	April 1944 - December 1946	Foggia, Bari, Athens, Kifissia, Palestine (March 1945), Ramleh	
1322 Wing RAF Regiment	July 1944 - November 1944	Aboukir, Taranto, Foggia, Naples	
1323 Wing RAF Regiment	July 1944 - March 1946	Secunderabad, Palel, Imphal, Magwe, Sumatra, Medan	
1324 Wing RAF Regiment	July 1944 - February 1946	Secunderabad, Tullihal, Shwebo, Morib, Singapore, Kallang	
1325 Wing RAF Regiment	October 1945 - March 1946	Secunderabad	
1326 Wing RAF Regiment	October 1944 - May 1946	Secunderabad, Maungdaw, Akyab, Insein, Penang, Singapore	
1327 Wing RAF Regiment	September 1944 - February 1946	Secunderabad, Chittagong, Ramree, Mingaladon, Singapore, Kuala Lumpur	
1328 Wing RAF Regiment	September 1944 - April 1946	Bari, Prykos, Zara, Klagenfurt, Meiselburg, Troffiach, Graz	
1329 Wing RAF Regiment	November 1944 - February 1946	UK, Bombay (January 1945), Agartala, Monywa, Mingaladon, Penang (September 1945), Singapore, Tengah; RAF Davidstow Moor	
1330 Wing RAF Regiment	December 1944 - March 1946	UK, Bombay (January 1945), Agartala, Toungoo, Pegu, Rangoon; RAF Davidstow Moor	
1331 Wing RAF Regiment	February 1945 - May 1946	Bombay, Agartala, Chittagong, Akyab, Hong Kong (October 1945), RAF Kai Tak; RAF Davidstow Moor	
1332 Wing RAF Regiment	January 1945 - September 1945	RAF Bradwell Bay	
1333 Wing RAF Regiment	January 1945 - September 1945	RAF Manston, RAF Bradwell Bay	
1334 Wing RAF Regiment	January 1945 - September 1945	RAF Kenley, RAF Gatwick; RAF Hawkinge	
1335 Wing RAF Regiment	January 1945 - September 1945	RAF Kenley, RAF Gatwick	
1336 Wing RAF Regiment	January 1945 - July 1945	RAF Detling, Trondheim	
1337 Wing RAF Regiment	January 1945 - October 1945	RAF Colerne, RAF Gatwick	
1338 Wing RAF Regiment	January 1945 - October 1945	RAF Detling, RAF Llanbedr	

=== Armoured Car Companies ===
- No. 1 Armoured Car Company RAF
- No. 2 Armoured Car Company RAF
- No. 3 Armoured Car Company RAF

=== Armoured Car Squadrons ===
- No. 2702 Armoured Car Squadron RAF Interim redesignation between No. 2 Armoured Car Company RAF and No. II Squadron RAF Regiment

=== RAF Regiment Squadrons ===
==== 001-200 ====
Squadron	Years active	Home bases	Notes
3 Squadron RAF Regiment		RAF Aldergrove; RAF Wittering	disbanded 14 April 2015
4 Squadron RAF Regiment	1947-48	Celle	Renumbered from 2777 Squadron on 21 August 1947, absorbed into 1 Squadron, 15 March 1948.
16 Squadron RAF Regiment	1948–2007		RAF Catterick, Nr. Ireland 1969, RAF Aldergrove, Enniskillen, HMS Sea Eagle-Londonderry
17 Squadron RAF Regiment			
18 Squadron RAF Regiment			
19 Squadron RAF Regiment		RAF Brize Norton	
20 Squadron RAF Regiment		RAF Honington	
21 Squadron RAF Regiment		RAF Nicosia	
22 Squadron RAF Regiment			disbanded 1957
23 Squadron RAF Regiment			
24 Squadron RAF Regiment			
25 Squadron RAF Regiment			
26 Squadron RAF Regiment	1951-2008 2010-Unknown	RAF Honington	
27 Squadron RAF Regiment	1951-2021		
28 Squadron RAF Regiment			
30 Squadron RAF Regiment		Suez	
37 Squadron RAF Regiment	1951–2006	Abu Sueir, Nicosia, Akrotiri, Upwood, Khormaksar, Aldergrove/Ballykelly/Bishops Court, Catterick, Bruggen, Wittering	
48 Squadron RAF Regiment	1951-1998	RAF Waddington 1996 - 1998.	Formed as a Field Sqn at RAF Chivenor on 3 October 1951, and moved subsequently to RAF Rudloe Manor in October 1955, The squadron re-roled as a Light Anti-Aircraft (LAA) unit in January 1956, but reverted to being a field squadron on 2 November 1956. The squadron deployed to Egypt between 6 November and 28 December 1956. A detachment to Northern Ireland in 1957 was followed by moves to RAF Felixstowe in May 1958, RAF Upwood in July 1962 and Catterick in July 1964. Over the period 1959-1970 the squadron saw deployments to Gan, Aden, Antigua, Hong Kong and Northern Ireland. The squadron was equipped with the Tigercat missile system between 1967 and 1978, and during this period it undertook further deployments to Northern Ireland between 1971 and 1975 and British Honduras (Belize) in 1972 and from 1976 to 1994. The squadron re-roled as a Short Range Air Defence (SHORAD) unit with the Rapier Field Standard A system in 1978 and relocated to RAF Lossiemouth. Initially, the system used by the squadron was optical only, but it received DN181 Blindfire radar trackers in 1983. It eventually saw an equipment uplift to Rapier Field Standard B1 (Modified). In the period after its move to RAF Lossiemouth it undertook operational deployments to Belize, the Falkland Islands and RAF Akrotiri in Cyprus. It re-located to RAF Waddington in 1996 where it became a 'cadre-ised' unit (joint Regular/Reserve) co-located with 27 Sqn RAF Regt, and disbanded at RAF Waddington in October 1998.
54 Squadron RAF Regiment	October 1989 -	First base RAF Leeming	BAe Rapier
56 Squadron RAF Regiment			
57 Squadron RAF Regiment			
58 Squadron RAF Regiment		RAF Catterick	Disbanded 2014
60 Squadron RAF Regiment			
66 Squadron RAF Regiment		RAF West Raynham	
194 Squadron RAF Regiment			

==== 2700-2799 ====
Squadron	Years active	Home bases	Notes
2701 Squadron RAF Regiment	August 1944 - September 1945	Normandy, Melsbroek, Fassberg; Catterick, RAF Coolham, RAF Gatwick, RAF Manston, RAF Merston	LAA Squadron
2702 Squadron RAF Regiment	February 1942 - October 1946	RAF Gatwick, RAF Harrow, RAF Ludford Magna, RAF Tangmere, RAF Yatesbury	LAA Squadron renamed No. II Squadron
2703 Squadron RAF Regiment		RAF Catterick, RAF Merston, RAF Southend RAF Staplehurst, RAF Westhampnett	Field squadron
2703 Squadron RAF Regiment	1941 - December 1945	RAF Worcester (1941), Regiment Depot (1942), RAF Catterick (1943), Eindhoven (April 1944), Achmer, Celle, Flensburg	LAA Squadron
2704 Squadron RAF Regiment	1941 - October 1945	RAF Llanbedr (1941), Regiment Depot (1942), RAF Tangmere (1944), RAF Folkingham (1945); RAF Kenley, RAF Bolt Head, RAF Westhampnett	LAA Squadron
2705 Squadron RAF Regiment	1941 - July 1944	RAF Fairwood Common (1941), Regiment Depot (1942), RAF North Coates (1943), RAF Grantham, RAF Biggin Hill, RAF Langham	LAA Squadron
2706 Squadron RAF Regiment	1941 - May 1946	RAF Andreas (1941), Regiment Depot (1942), RAF Hemswell (1943), Bombay, Agartala, Dohazari, Maungdaw, Akyab, Hong Kong; RAF Hamble	LAA Squadron
2707 Squadron RAF Regiment	1941 - October 1945	RAF Ballykelly (1941), RAF Hawkinge, RAF West Malling (1944), RAF Gravesend, RAF Lympne; RAF Aldergrove, RAF Ballyhalbert, Bentwaters	LAA Squadron
2708 Squadron RAF Regiment	1941 - May 1946	RAF Northolt (1941), RAF Oakington (1943), Bombay (October 1943), Agartala, Meiktila, Toungoo, Calcutta, Hong Kong; RAF Bourn, RAF Davidstow Moor, RAF Greencastle	LAA Squadron
2709 Squadron RAF Regiment	1941 - October 1945	RAF Henlow (1941), RAF Biggin Hill (1942), RAF Tangmere (1944), RAF Folkingham (1945); RAF Detling, RAF Hawkinge, RAF Llanbedr, RAF Westhampnett	LAA Squadron
2710 Squadron RAF Regiment	1941 - May 1946	RAF Valley (1941), RAF West Malling (1942), Lagens Airfield, Azores (October 1943 - October 1944), Flensburg, RAF Schleswigland (1946); Llanbedr, RAF Haverfordwest	Field Squadron; Rifle Squadron
2711 Squadron RAF Regiment	February 1942 - July 1944	RAF Crosby-on-Eden, RAF Bawdsey, RAF Filey	LAA Squadron
2712 Squadron RAF Regiment	February 1942 - July 1944	RAF Ballyhalbert, RAF Mildenhall, RAF Lakenheath	LAA Squadron
2713 Squadron RAF Regiment	August 1944 -	Rennes, Caen, Brussels, Leopold Canal, Ghent, Bonn, Luneburg; RAF Great Sampford, RAF Westhampnett	Rifle Squadron
2714 Squadron RAF Regiment	February 1942 - July 1944	RAF Wormwell, RAF Skeabrae	LAA Squadron
2715 Squadron RAF Regiment	February - December 1945	Gilze Rijen, Knokke; RAF Bolt Head, RAF East Wretham, RAF Swanton Morley	LAA Squadron
2716 Squadron RAF Regiment	February 1942 - July 1944	RAF Finningley, RAF Skitten, RAF Holme-on-Spalding Moor; RAF Breighton, RAF Warboys	LAA Squadron
2717 Squadron RAF Regiment	August 1944 -	Rouen, Brussels, Maele, Damme, Leopold Canal, Antwerp, Melsbroek, Celle, Palestine, Ramleh, Petat Tiqva, Jerusalem; RAF Aston Down	Rifle Squadron
2718 Squadron RAF Regiment	February 1942 - June 1945	RAF Leeming, RAF Hornchurch, RAF Ford; Acklington	LAA Squadron
2719 Squadron RAF Regiment	November 1944 - May 1946	Waspik Boven, Grimbergen, Jever, Buckeburg, Detmold; RAF Aston Down, RAF Deanland, RAF Coltishall	Rifle Squadron
2720 Squadron RAF Regiment	February 1942 - September 1945	RAF Linton-on-Ouse, RAF Manston; RAF Friston, RAF Merston, RAF Snailwell	LAA Squadron
2721 Squadron RAF Regiment	February 1942 -	RAF Mildenhall, Algiers, Cap Serrat, Medjez-el-Bab, Bagnoli, Cerignola, Anzio, Rome, Perugia, Citta di Castello, Rimini, Cesena, Fosso di Ghiaia, Classe Fuori, Ravenna	Field Squadron
2721 Squadron RAF Regiment	December 1945 -	Palestine, St Jean, Ein Shemer	Rifle Squadron
2722 Squadron RAF Regiment	February 1942 - February 1945	RAF Newton, RAF Folkestone; RAF Coolham, RAF Downham Market, RAF Fairwood Common, RAF Kingston Bagpuize	LAA Squadron
2723 Squadron RAF Regiment	February 1942 - September 1945	RAF Oakington, RAF Tangmere, RAF North Weald; RAF Merston	LAA Squadron
2724 Squadron RAF Regiment	1944 -	Capelle, Warpik, Gilze Rijen, Fassberg, Celle, Gatow; RAF Aston Down, RAF East Wretham, RAF Feltwell, RAF Watton	Rifle Squadron
2725 Squadron RAF Regiment	February 1942 - April 1944	RAF Stradishall, RAF Swingate; RAF Coltishall	LAA Squadron
2726 Squadron RAF Regiment	August 1944 - March 1946	Normandy, Eindhoven, Wilhelmina Canal, Maas, Luneburg, Lübeck, Schleswig Holstein, Vandel, Lübeck; RAF Biggin Hill	Rifle Squadron
2727 Squadron RAF Regiment	February 1942 - February 1946	RAF Syerston, RAF Eastbourne; RAF Bradwell Bay, RAF Friston, RAF Henlow, RAF Stapleford Tawney	LAA Squadron
2728 Squadron RAF Regiment	February 1942 - June 1944	RAF Waterbeach, RAF Swingate, RAF Branscombe	LAA Squadron
2729 Squadron RAF Regiment	August 1944 - March 1946	Normandy, Bayeaux, Trouville, Wilhelmina Canal, Bad Eilsen, Gatow; RAF Catterick, RAF Southend	Rifle Squadron
2730 Squadron RAF Regiment	February 1942 - June 1944	RAF Wyton, RAF Bawdsey, RAF Grantham; RAF Bradwell Bay	LAA Squadron
2731 Squadron RAF Regiment		RAF Catfoss, RAF Davidstow Moor, RAF Docking, RAF Hutton Cranswick, RAF Langham, RAF Little Staughton, RAF St Eval	
2731 Squadron RAF Regiment	August 1946	St Omer, Hamburg	Rifle Squadron
2732 Squadron RAF Regiment	February 1942 - April 1945	Bassingbourn, RAF Rye; RAF Llanbedr	LAA Squadron
2733 Squadron RAF Regiment	February 1942 - April 1945	RAF Benson, RAF Hawkinge, RAF Penshurst	LAA Squadron
2734 Squadron RAF Regiment	June 1944 - December 1945	Normandy, Beny, Brussels, Eindhoven, Volkel, Heesch, Fassberg, Lübeck	LAA Squadron
2735 Squadron RAF Regiment	February 1942 - April 1945	RAF Bramcote, RAF All Hallows; RAF Coltishall, RAF Martlesham Heath	LAA Squadron
2736 Squadron RAF Regiment	June 1944 -	Courselle, Gilze Rijen, Wunstorf; RAF Catterick, RAF Feltwell	LAA Squadron
2737 Squadron RAF Regiment		Eastbourne, RAF Dyce	LAA Squadron
2737 Squadron RAF Regiment	May - December 1945	Kristianasand, Kjevic, Lister, Oslo	Rifle Squadron
2738 Squadron RAF Regiment	January 1945 - July 1946	St Omer, Mons, Bonn; RAF Acklington, RAF Bolt Head, RAF Davidstow Moor, RAF Kenley, RAF Matlaske, RAF St Eval, RAF Upper Heyford	LAA Squadron
2739 Squadron RAF Regiment	November 1944 - August 1946	UK, Bombay, Secunderabad, Calcutta, Chittagong, Maungdaw, Warangal, Madras, Sumatra, Medan; RAF Bradwell Bay, RAF Great Sampford, RAF Hutton Cranswick, RAF Usworth	Field Squadron
2740 Squadron RAF Regiment	February 1945 - September 1946	St Omer, Weeze, Vandel, Celle, Gatow	Rifle Squadron
2741 Squadron RAF Regiment	January 1945 - August 1946	Ghent, Liege, Detmold; RAF Acklington, RAF Beaulieu, RAF Matlaske	Rifle Squadron
2742 Squadron RAF Regiment	November 1944 - October 1945	Maas, Waal, Evere, Remagen, Bonn	Armoured Car Squadron
2742 Squadron RAF Regiment	October 1945 -	Palestine, Petat Tiqva, Ramat David; RAF Aston Down, RAF Catterick, RAF Merston, RAF Pembrey, RAF Westhampnett	Rifle Squadron
2743 Squadron RAF Regiment	January 1945 - February 1946	UK, Bombay, Agartala, Ondauk, Ondaw, Calcutta, Hong Kong; RAF Bircham Newton, RAF Colerne, RAF Davidstow Moor	Field Squadron
2744 Squadron RAF Regiment	December 1943 - April 1946	Naples, Cassino, Gothic Line, Austria, Zeltweg, Greece, Glifhada	
2745 Squadron RAF Regiment	February 1942 - October 1943	RAF Leuchars, RAF Biggin Hill; RAF Skeabrae	LAA Squadron
2746 Squadron RAF Regiment	February 1942 - September 1944	RAF Lossiemouth, RAF Detling	LAA Squadron
2747 Squadron RAF Regiment	February 1942 - October 1945	RAF Kinloss, RAF Filey	LAA Squadron
2748 Squadron RAF Regiment	January 1945 - April 1946	UK, Bombay, Agartala, Santa Cruz, Malaya, Singapore, Tengah, Java, Batavia, Surabaya, Bali; RAF Blakehill Farm, RAF Davidstow Moor	Field Squadron
2749 Squadron RAF Regiment	15 February 1942 - 30 September 1946	Filey, Detmold, Gutersloh, Wahn; RAF Banff, RAF Bircham Newton, RAF Docking, RAF North Luffenham, RAF Swanton Morley	Rifle Squadron
2750 Squadron RAF Regiment	December 1944 -	Mons, Bonn, Achmer, Bochum, Osnabrück, Wahn; RAF Colerne, RAF Deanland	Rifle Squadron
2751 Squadron RAF Regiment	February 1942 - July 1944	RAF Sullom Voe, RAF Eastchurch; RAF Friston, RAF Snailwell	LAA Squadron
2752 Squadron RAF Regiment	February 1942 - April 1945	RAF Stranraer, RAF Swingate, RAF Hawkshill	LAA Squadron
2753 Squadron RAF Regiment	February 1942 - November 1945	RAF Dyce, RAF All Hallows	LAA Squadron
2754 Squadron RAF Regiment	February 1942 - July 1944	RAF Limavady, RAF Stradishall; RAF Greencastle, RAF Maydown	LAA Squadron
2755 Squadron RAF Regiment	February 1942 - July 1944	RAF Maghaberry, RAF West Raynham; RAF Greencastle	LAA Squadron
2756 Squadron RAF Regiment	February 1942 - July 1944	RAF Eglinton, RAF Coningsby; RAF Greencastle, RAF Maydown	LAA Squadron
2757 Squadron RAF Regiment	August 1944 -	Normandy, Rouen, Antwerp, Leopold Canal, Wunstorf, Bonn, Gutersloh, Celle; RAF Andover, RAF Aston Down, RAF Catterick, RAF Great Sampford, Merston	Armoured Car Squadron
2758 Squadron RAF Regiment	February 1942 - June 1945	RAF Aberporth, RAF Foulness	LAA Squadron
2759 Squadron RAF Regiment	October 1944 - April 1946	UK, Bombay, Secunderabad, Chittagong, Chiringa, Meiktila, Toungoo, Penang, Singapore, Tengah; RAF Andover, RAF Aston Down, RAF Halton, RAF Snailwell	Field Squadron
2760 Squadron RAF Regiment	February 1944 - December 1946	Ostend, Altona	LAA Squadron
2761 Squadron RAF Regiment	February 1942 - April 1945	RAF Bottisham, RAF Rochford; RAF Merston, RAF Southend, RAF Westhampnett	LAA Squadron
2762 Squadron RAF Regiment	February 1942 - July 1945	RAF Cardiff, RAF Beaulieu, RAF Manston; RAF Friston, RAF Merston	LAA Squadron
2763 Squadron RAF Regiment	February 1942 - August 1945	RAF Doncaster, RAF Ibsley, RAF Lympne, RAF Manston, RAF Portreath, RAF Wyton	LAA Squadron
2764 Squadron RAF Regiment	February 1942 - May 1943	RAF Perton	Field Squadron
2764 Squadron RAF Regiment	May 1943 - June 1943	RAF Perton	LAA Squadron
2765 Squadron RAF Regiment		Acklington, RAF Bircham Newton, RAF Docking, RAF Langham, RAF Matlaske, RAF Merston, Bognor Regis	LAA Squadron
2765 Squadron RAF Regiment	February 1945 - August 1946	St Omer, Fuhlsbuttel, Schleswig, Holstein, Flensburg, Sylt, Grove, Eggebek	Rifle Squadron
2766 Squadron RAF Regiment	February 1942 - October 1945	RAF Kidsale, RAF Brooklands; RAF Andrews Field, RAF Merston, RAF Skeabrae, RAF Southend, RAF Westhampnett	LAA Squadron
2767 Squadron RAF Regiment	February 1942 - October 1945	RAF Manorbier, RAF Hastings; RAF Biggin Hill, Merston	LAA Squadron
2768 Squadron RAF Regiment	February 1945 - October 1945	Melsbroek, Volkel, Gilze Rijen	Rifle Squadron
2768 Squadron RAF Regiment		RAF Deanland	LAA Squadron
2769 Squadron RAF Regiment	February 1942 - October 1945	RAF Old Sarum, RAF West Malling; RAF Andrews Field	LAA Squadron
2770 Squadron RAF Regiment		RAF Blackbushe, RAF Bottesford, RAF Dyce, RAF Swanton Morley, RAF West Raynham	Field Squadron
2770 Squadron RAF Regiment	October 1944 -	Strasbourg, Mutzig, Ardennes, Krefeld, Gutersloh	Rifle Squadron
2771 Squadron RAF Regiment	April 1942 - March 1946	RAF Cleave, Algiers, Bizerta, Naples, Cassino, Rimini, Aegran, Greece, Yugoslavia, Prykos, Zadar, Austria, Vienna	Field Squadron
2771 Squadron RAF Regiment	March 1946 -	Palestine, Ramat David, St Jean	Rifle Squadron
2772 Squadron RAF Regiment	February 1942 - April 1945	RAF Towyn, RAF Warmwell; RAF Brunton	LAA Squadron
2773 Squadron RAF Regiment		RAF Blackbushe, RAF Catterick	Field Squadron
2773 Squadron RAF Regiment	August 1944 - December 1945	Eindhoven. Hildesheim	LAA Squadron
2774 Squadron RAF Regiment	February 1942 - April 1945	RAF Long Kesh, RAF St Leonards; RAF Bisterne	LAA Squadron
2774 Squadron RAF Regiment	May 1942 -	RAF Belton Park, Algiers, Medjez el Bab, Bizerta, Lampedusa	Field Squadron
2775 Squadron RAF Regiment	February 1942 - October 1943	RAF Newtownards, RAF Middle Wallop	LAA Squadron
2776 Squadron RAF Regiment	February 1942 - October 1944	RAF Helensburgh, RAF Swinderby; RAF Davidstow Moor, RAF Haverfordwest, RAF Langham	LAA Squadron
2776 Squadron RAF Regiment	October 1944 - February 1945	RAF Swinderby	Field Squadron
2777 Squadron RAF Regiment		RAF Aston Down, RAF Catterick	
2777 Squadron RAF Regiment	August 1944 -	Beny, Grimbergen, Hamburg, Fassberg, Achmer, Celle	Armoured Car Squadron
2778 Squadron RAF Regiment	February 1942 - May 1945	RAF Jurby, RAF Maidstone; RAF Westhampnett	LAA Squadron
2779 Squadron RAF Regiment	February 1942 - April 1945	RAF Netheravon, RAF Helston	LAA Squadron
2780 Squadron RAF Regiment	February 1942 - April 1945	RAF Penrhos, RAF Smiths Lawn; RAF Blackbushe, RAF Boscombe Down	LAA Squadron
2781 Squadron RAF Regiment	August 1944 - July 1946	Normandy, Maas, Wilhelmina Canal, Hannover, Achmer, Schleswig Holstein, Sylt, Lübeck; RAF Great Sampford, RAF Redhill, RAF Wyton	Armoured Car Squadron
2782 Squadron RAF Regiment	February 1942 - July 1945	RAF Manby, RAF St Eval	LAA Squadron
2783 Squadron RAF Regiment	February 1942 - July 1945	RAF Upavon, RAF Swingate; RAF Heston	LAA Squadron
2784 Squadron RAF Regiment	February 1942 - October 1944	RAF West Freugh, RAF Dyce	LAA Squadron
2784 Squadron RAF Regiment	October 1944 - February 1945	RAF Dyce	Field Squadron
2785 Squadron RAF Regiment	February 1942 - July 1944	RAF Chivenor	LAA Squadron
2786 Squadron RAF Regiment		RAF Boscombe Down, RAF Davidstow Moor, RAF Fairwood Common, RAF Kingston Bagpuize	
2786 Squadron RAF Regiment	April 1945 -	Ghent, Hamelin, Hamburg	Rifle Squadron
2787 Squadron RAF Regiment	February 1942 - April 1945	RAF Chester, RAF Martlesham Heath	LAA Squadron
2788 Squadron RAF Regiment	March 1942 - March 1945	RAF Belton Park, Algiers, Cap Serrat, Cap Bon, Tunis, Cassino, Southern France, Italy, Ravenna, Greece, Hassani	Field Squadron
2788 Squadron RAF Regiment	March 1945 -	Greece, Palestine, Ramleh, Ein Shemer	Rifle Squadron
2789 Squadron RAF Regiment	February 1942 - October 1944	RAF Montrose, RAF Tangmere	LAA Squadron
2790 Squadron RAF Regiment	February 1942 - October 1944	RAF Worcester, RAF Merston; RAF Fairwood Common	LAA Squadron
2791 Squadron RAF Regiment	February - December 1945	Lille, Celle, Stavanger, Sola; Bentwaters	
2792 Squadron RAF Regiment	February 1942 - April 1945	RAF Kidlington, RAF Friston; RAF Davidstow Moor, RAF Broadwell	LAA Squadron
2793 Squadron RAF Regiment	February 1942 - April 1945	RAF Grantham, RAF Detling; RAF Davidstow Moor, RAF Friston, RAF Llanbedr, RAF Westhampnett	LAA Squadron
2794 Squadron RAF Regiment	June 1944 - December 1945	Brussels, Ophoven, Schleswig Holstein, Husum, Vandel, Flensburg; RAF Colerne, RAF Snailwell	LAA Squadron
2795 Squadron RAF Regiment	February 1942 - October 1945	RAF Bovingdon, RAF Foulness; RAF Llanbedr, RAF Merston, RAF Westhampnett	LAA Squadron
2796 Squadron RAF Regiment	February 1942 - April 1945	RAF Ronaldsway, RAF All Hallows; RAF Davidstow Moor, RAF Hurn, RAF Kingston Bagpuize	LAA Squadron
2797 Squadron RAF Regiment	February 1942 - April 1945	RAF North Luffenham, RAF Littlestone; RAF Blyton, RAF Breighton, RAF Faldingworth	LAA Squadron
2798 Squadron RAF Regiment	June 1944 -	Rennes, Paris, Nijmegen, Brussels, Wamel, Waal, Walcheren, Cortenburg, Bastogne, Kiel, List, Flensburg, Wahn; RAF Catterick	Rifle Squadron
2799 Squadron RAF Regiment	February 1942 - October 1945	RAF Grangemouth, RAF Hawkinge; RAF Acklington, RAF Fairwood Common, RAF Kingston Bagpuize; RAF Christchurch	LAA Squadron

==== 2800-2899 ====
Squadron	Years active	Home bases	Notes
2800 Squadron RAF Regiment	August 1944 - December 1945	Merville, Maldagem, Evere, Gilze Rijen, Dedelstorf; RAF Acklington, RAF Blackbushe, RAF Catterick, RAF Colerne, RAF Coolham, RAF Newchurch	LAA Squadron
2801 Squadron RAF Regiment	February 1942 - April 1945	RAF Northolt, Isle of Wight	LAA Squadron
2802 Squadron RAF Regiment	January 1945 - February 1946	UK, Bombay, Agartala, Dwhala, Kalawya, Rangoon, Penang, Kuala Lumpur; RAF Cardington, RAF Davidstow Moor, RAF Langham	Field Squadron
2803 Squadron RAF Regiment	February 1942 - October 1945	RAF Sealand, Friston; RAF Acklington, RAF Biggin Hill, RAF Merston	LAA Squadron
2804 Squadron RAF Regiment	September 1944 - December 1945	St Croix, Ardennes, Wunstorf, Gatow; RAF Appledram, RAF Aston Down	Armoured Car Squadron
2805 Squadron RAF Regiment	January 1945 - June 1946	RAF Hutton Cranswick, RAF Matlaske	Rifle Squadron
2806 Squadron RAF Regiment	July 1944 - April 1946	Carpiquet, Beauvais, Melsbroek, Escaut, Albert Canal, Eindhoven, Luneburg, Schleswig Holstein, Sylt; RAF Biggin Hill, RAF Catterick	Armoured Car Squadron
2807 Squadron RAF Regiment	February 1945 - April 1946	Eindhoven, Wunstorf, Wahn; RAF Broadwell, RAF Cranfield, RAF Friston, RAF Yatesbury	Rifle Squadron
2808 Squadron RAF Regiment	February 1942 - October 1944	RAF Polebrook, RAF Kingston	LAA Squadron
2809 Squadron RAF Regiment	June 1944 - December 1945	Normandy, St Croix, Ellon, Carpiquet, Volkel, Celle, Tondern, Schleswig Holstein; RAF Catterick, RAF Headcorn, RAF Kingsnorth, RAF Langham, RAF Snailwell, RAF Swanton Morley, RAF Woodchurch	LAA Squadron
2810 Squadron RAF Regiment	January 1945 -	UK, Bombay, Agartala, Chaklala, Calcutta, Singapore, Java, Sumatra; RAF Colerne, RAF Davidstow Moor, RAF Southend, RAF Tarrant Rushton	Field Squadron
2811 Squadron RAF Regiment	November 1944 - March 1946	Mons, Malmedy, Laroche, Morville, Ardennes, Weikersheim, Scheede, Ghent; Blackbushe, RAF Matlaske	Rifle Squadron
2812 Squadron RAF Regiment	February - November 1945	Ostend, Epinoy; RAF Coltishall	LAA Squadron
2813 Squadron RAF Regiment	February 1942 - June 1945	RAF Thurleigh, Merston	LAA Squadron
2814 Squadron RAF Regiment		Torquay	LAA Squadron
2814 Squadron RAF Regiment	April 1945 - July 1946	Antwerp, Eindhoven, Wesel, Hamm, Hamelin, Scharfoldendorf, Hildesheim	Rifle Squadron
2815 Squadron RAF Regiment	February 1942 - October 1944	RAF Atcham, RAF Merryfield	LAA Squadron
2816 Squadron RAF Regiment	August 1944 - June 1946	St Croix, Rouen, St Pol, Moerkerke, Leopold Canal, Damme, Grimbergen, Woernsdrecht, Deurne, Antwerp, Ahlhorn, Hustedy, Celle	Rifle Squadron
2817 Squadron RAF Regiment	June 1944 - December 1945	Normandy, Grange, Beauvais, Brussels, Eindhoven, Heesch, Uetersen; RAF Ashford	LAA Squadron
2818 Squadron RAF Regiment	February 1942 - April 1945	RAF Theale, RAF Folkestone	LAA Squadron
2819 Squadron RAF Regiment	April 1941 (as 819 Defence Squadron) - December 1945	Normandy, St Croix, Beny, Cristot, Brussels, Eindhoven, Heesch, Luneburg, Kastrup, Schleswig Holstein, Luneck; RAF Chelveston, RAF Ludham, RAF Gravesend, RAF North Weald, RAF Swanton Morley, RAF Funtington	LAA Squadron
2820 Squadron RAF Regiment	February 1942 - May 1945	RAF Atcham, RAF Southend; RAF Acklington, RAF Langham	LAA Squadron
2821 Squadron RAF Regiment	February 1942 - October 1945	RAF Perth, RAF Thorney Island	LAA Squadron
2822 Squadron RAF Regiment		Lagens Airfield, Azores (May–October 1944)	Field Squadron
2822 Squadron RAF Regiment	May 1945 - April 1946	Copenhagen, Aarhus, Vandel, Gutersloh	Rifle Squadron
2823 Squadron RAF Regiment	February 1945 - May 1946	Amiens, Brussels, Evere, Rheine, Fuhlsbuttel, Stade; RAF Deanland, RAF Lympne	Rifle Squadron
2824 Squadron RAF Regiment	February - November 1945	Vitry, Gilze Rijen; RAF Biggin Hill, RAF Skeabrae	Rifle Squadron
2825 Squadron RAF Regiment	February 1942 - April 1946	RAF Booker, Algiers, Maison Blanche, Constantine, Souk el Khemis, Kairouan, Naples, Amendola, Altamura, Bari, Yugoslavia, Split, Dubrovnik, Austria, Klagenfurt, Schwechar	Field Squadron
2826 Squadron RAF Regiment	February - December 1945	Courtrai, Lübeck, Flensburg	LAA Squadron
2827 Squadron RAF Regiment	July 1944 -	Normandy, Cristot, St Clair, Wilhelmina Canal, Helmond, Volkel, Eindhoven, Birgden, Everson, Mettingen, Schleswig Holstein, Lübeck, Kiel, Vaerlose, Hamburg, Gutersloh	Rifle Squadron
2828 Squadron RAF Regiment	February 1942 - August 1945	RAF Honeybourne, RAF Detling	LAA Squadron
2829 Squadron RAF Regiment	October 1944 -	Gilze Rijen, Maas, Grave, Celle, Lübeck; RAF Coolham	Rifle Squadron
2830 Squadron RAF Regiment	May - October 1945	Tromso, Bardufoss, Fornebu; RAF Southend	Rifle Squadron
2831 Squadron RAF Regiment	October 1944 - March 1946	Epinoy, Sancourt, Dunkirk, Achmer, Detmold; Bradwell Bay	Rifle Squadron
2832 Squadron RAF Regiment	February 1942 - April 1945	RAF Honiley, RAF Shoreham, RAF Tangmere	LAA Squadron
2833 Squadron RAF Regiment	February 1942 - July 1944	RAF Hadley, RAF Driffield	LAA Squadron
2834 Squadron RAF Regiment	June 1944 - November 1945	Bazenville, Carpiquet, Cristot, Boussey, St Andre, Volkel, Kastrup, Flensburg; RAF Newchurch, RAF Southend	LAA Squadron
2835 Squadron RAF Regiment	February 1942 - April 1945	RAF Woodvale, RAF Hooe; Blakehill Farm	LAA Squadron
2836 Squadron RAF Regiment	February 1942 - July 1944	RAF St Angelo, RAF Swanton Morley; Maydown	LAA Squadron
2837 Squadron RAF Regiment	October 1944 - April 1946	UK, Bombay, Calcutta, Chittagong, Ramu, Cox's Bazar, Ramree, Madras, Singapore, Sumatra, Medan	LAA Squadron
2838 Squadron RAF Regiment	February - December 1945	Melsbroek, Gutersloh	LAA Squadron
2839 Squadron RAF Regiment	February 1942 - August 1945	RAF Marston Moor, RAF Southend; Bentwaters, RAF Stapleford Tawney (1945)	LAA Squadron
2840 Squadron RAF Regiment	February 1942 - August 1945	RAF Ossington, Bradwell Bay	LAA Squadron
2841 Squadron RAF Regiment	February 1942 - February 1945	RAF Benbecula, RAF High Wycombe	LAA Squadron
2842 Squadron RAF Regiment	February 1942 - July 1944	RAF Tiree, RAF Binbrook	LAA Squadron
2843 Squadron RAF Regiment	November 1944 - August 1946	Maldegem, Capelle, Gilze Rijen, Grimbergen, Delden, Scheuen, Dedelstorf, Ahlhorn	Rifle Squadron
2844 Squadron RAF Regiment	May 1945 - March 1946	Luneburg; RAF Manston; RAF Wyton	Rifle Squadron
2845 Squadron RAF Regiment	September 1944 - December 1945	Lisieux, Epinoy, Vitry, Gilze Rijen, Delmenhorst	Rifle Squadron
2846 Squadron RAF Regiment	January 1945 - March 1946	UK, Bombay, Secunderabad. Santa Cruz, Malaya, Singapore; Friston	Field Squadron
2847 Squadron RAF Regiment	May - December 1945	Trondheim, Vaernes, Lade; RAF Biggin Hill, RAF Hawkinge, RAF Llandow	Rifle Squadron
2848 Squadron RAF Regiment	November 1944 - July 1946	Volkel, Assche, Herford, Magdeburg, Kladow, Gatow, Fassberg; RAF Langham	Rifle Squadron
2849 Squadron RAF Regiment	February 1942 - June 1944	RAF Debden, RAF Great Sampford, RAF Shoreham, RAF Wing	LAA Squadron
2850 Squadron RAF Regiment	February 1942 - November 1943	Aldergrove, MOD St Athan	LAA Squadron
2851 Squadron RAF Regiment	February 1942 - November 1943	RAF Maydown, RAF Tarrant Rushton; Friston	LAA Squadron
2852 Squadron RAF Regiment	January 1945 - March 1946	UK, Bombay, Secunderabad, Santa Cruz, Malaya, Kuala Lumpur	LAA Squadron
2853 Squadron RAF Regiment	May - December 1945	Traben Trabach, Bad Godesburg	Rifle Squadron
2854 Squadron RAF Regiment	October 1944 - July 1946	UK, Bombay, Secunderabad, Akyab, Sinthe, Magwe, Mingaladon, Rangoon, Penang, Borneo, Labuan; RAF Beaulieu, RAF Carew Cheriton	LAA Squadron
2855 Squadron RAF Regiment	July 1943 - January 1944	UK, Sicily, Pachino, Lentini, Italy, Reggio, Bari, Triolo, Canne, San Marco	LAA Squadron
2856 Squadron RAF Regiment		UK, Sicily, Augusta, Agnone, Italy, Bari, Foggia, Mileni, Cutella, San Vito Marino, UK	
2856 Squadron RAF Regiment	January 1945 - April 1946	St Omer, Dunkirk, Eindhoven, Damme, Diepholz, Celle, Fassberg, Schleswig Holstein, Husum	Rifle Squadron
2857 Squadron RAF Regiment	November 1944	Sicily, Augusta, Lentini East, Scordia, Messina, Italy, Palmi, Crotone, Bari, Foggia, Amendola, Cutella, San Vito Marino, Foggia, Naples, Capodichino	
2858 Squadron RAF Regiment		UK, Sicily, Augusta, Lentini West, Pelagonia, Milazzo East, Messina, Italy, Reggio, Bari, Foggia, Madna, Campomarino, Foggia, Naples, UK	
2858 Squadron RAF Regiment	May 1945 - April 1946	Maldegem, Scheuen, Wesendorf, Fassberg, Luneburg, Celle	Rifle Squadron
2859 Squadron RAF Regiment		UK, Sicily, Agnone, Lentini East, San Franceso, Lago, UK	
2860 Squadron RAF Regiment	February - September 1942	RAF Leuchars	LAA Squadron
2860 Squadron RAF Regiment	May/June 1943 -	La Marsa, Hammamet, Sousse, Bizerta, Italy, Salerno, Naples. Cerignola, UK	LAA Squadron
2861 Squadron RAF Regiment	May/June 1943 - November 1944	La Marsa, Hammamet, Sousse, Bizerta, Corsica, Ajaccop. Ile Rousse, Italy, Regina, San Servero, Accera	LAA Squadron
2862 Squadron RAF Regiment	May/June 1943 -	La Marsa, Sousse, Malta, gozo, Sicily, Augusta, Agnone, Italy, Grottaglie, Bari, Termoli, Cutella, Sangro, Triono, UK	LAA Squadron
2862 Squadron RAF Regiment	January 1945 - March 1946	St Omer, Dunkirk, Rosieres, Buckeburg, Oberkirchen, Jever, Delmenhorst	Rifle Squadron
2863 Squadron RAF Regiment	May/June 1943 -	Gharmart, La Sebala, La Marsa, Bizerta, Italy, Naples, Caserta, UK	LAA Squadron
2863 Squadron RAF Regiment	November 1944 - November 1945	Froyennes, Dunkirk, Middelkirke, Gilze Rijen, Eindhoven, Wahn	Rifle Squadron
2864 Squadron RAF Regiment	May/June 1943 - September 1944	Grombalia, Lampedusa, Sousse, Sicily, Palermo, Syracuse, Catania, Italy, Bari, Taranto, Cap San Vito, Pozzouli	LAA Squadron
2864 Squadron RAF Regiment	September 1944 -	Foggia, Iesi, Osimo, Santarcangelo, Foccia, Lecce, Palestine, Ramat David, Ramleh, Lydda	Rifle Squadron
2865 Squadron RAF Regiment	May/June 1943 -	Bone, Sicily, Catania, Italy, Taranto, Grottaglie, UK	LAA Squadron
2865 Squadron RAF Regiment	January 1945 -	St Omer, Mons, Mutzig, Neustadt, Oberstein, Bad Homburg, Riefenburg, Tabarz, Hesselburg, Bonn, Buckeburg, Bad Eilsen, Gatow	Rifle Squadron
2866 Squadron RAF Regiment	May/June 1943 - April 1946	Setif, Bone, Tingley, Corsica, Ajaccio, Italy, Bastia, Pianosa Island, Sisco, Leghorn, Fano, Rimini, Ravenna, Fertcara, Austria, Klagenfurt, Italy, Codroito	LAA Squadron
2867 Squadron RAF Regiment	May/June 1943 - November 1944	Phillipeville, Protville, Bizerta, Italy, Salerno, Naples, Ponza, Foggia, Yugoslavia, Vis, Italy, Pomigliano, Bagnoli, Miseno, Bacoli	LAA Squadron
2868 Squadron RAF Regiment	May/June 1943 -	Protville, Hammam Lif, Bizerta, Sicily, Palermo, Naples, UK	LAA Squadron
2868 Squadron RAF Regiment	April 1945 - March 1946	Brussels, Rheine, Rehburg, Wuhrden, Wunstorf, Soltau, Uetersen	Rifle Squadron
2869 Squadron RAF Regiment	May/June 1943 -	La Sebala, Cap Serrat, Le Sebala, Bizerta, Sardinia, Cagliari, Sassari, Naples, UK	LAA Squadron
2870 Squadron RAF Regiment	May/June 1943 - January 1944	Maison Blanche, Setif	LAA Squadron
2871 Squadron RAF Regiment	1943-	RAF Belton Park	LAA Squadron
2871 Squadron RAF Regiment	October 1944 - December 1945	Melsbroek	Rifle Squadron
2872 Squadron RAF Regiment	1943 - December 1945	RAF Belton Park, Villon, Lille, Grimbergen, Woernsdrecht, Twente, Ahlhorn	LAA Squadron
2873 Squadron RAF Regiment	1943 - December 1945	RAF Belton Park, RAF Oulton, Beny, Fresnoy, Fort Rouge, St Denis, Helmond, Dedelstorf	LAA Squadron
2874 Squadron RAF Regiment	1943 - December 1945	RAF Belton Park, RAF Oulton, Martragny, Volkel, Dedelstorf	LAA Squadron
2875 Squadron RAF Regiment	June - November 1945	Les Buissons, Bazeville, Wavre, Grave, Helmond, Rheine, Celle, Fassberg, Schleswig Holstein, Flensburg, Gardemoen, Kjeller, Lillestrom; RAF Pembrey	LAA Squadron
2876 Squadron RAF Regiment	June 1944 - June 1946	Coulonds, Louvain, Gossecourt, Ophoven, Uetersen, Schleswig Holstein, Sylt; RAF Boxted, RAF Snailwell	LAA Squadron
2877 Squadron RAF Regiment	June 1943 - October 1944	RAF Kingscliffe, RAF Southend	LAA Squadron
2878 Squadron RAF Regiment	May 1945 - September 1946	Tilburg, Twente, Oldenburg, Delmenhorst; RAF Newchurch	Rifle Squadron
2879 Squadron RAF Regiment	November 1944 - May 1946	Vitry, Brussels, Eindhoven, Dortmund; RAF Brunton, RAF Castle Camps	Rifle Squadron
2880 Squadron RAF Regiment	August 1944 - June 1946	Verdeville, Volkel, Helmond, Twente, Celle, Wunstorf; RAF Ashford, RAF Gatwick, RAF Newchurch	LAA Squadron
2881 Squadron RAF Regiment	August 1944 - November 1945	St Croix, Verdeville, Volkel, Helmond, Schleswig Holstein, Uetersen, Travemünde	LAA Squadron
2882 Squadron RAF Regiment	June 1943 - April 1945	RAF Kingscliffe, RAF Folkestone; RAF Chailey, RAF Llanbedr	LAA Squadron
2883 Squadron RAF Regiment	April - December 1945	Melsbroek, Suchtelen, Dankersen, Grove, Schleswig Holstein, Wahn	Rifle Squadron
2884 Squadron RAF Regiment	June - November 1943	RAF Bedford, RAF Eastchurch	LAA Squadron
2885 Squadron RAF Regiment	June - October 1943	RAF Zeals, RAF Coltishall	LAA Squadron
2886 Squadron RAF Regiment	June 1943 - April 1945	RAF Riccall, RAF Hawkinge; RAF Davidstow Moor	LAA Squadron
2887 Squadron RAF Regiment	June - October 1943	RAF Castle Camps, RAF Wick	LAA Squadron
2888 Squadron RAF Regiment	June - October 1943	RAF Christchurch, RAF Ibsley	LAA Squadron
2889 Squadron RAF Regiment	June 1943 - May 1945	RAF Fairlop, RAF Lydd; RAF Davidstow Moor	
2890 Squadron RAF Regiment	June 1943 - April 1945	RAF Waddington, RAF Rye	LAA Squadron
2891 Squadron RAF Regiment	June 1943 - April 1945	RAF Dartmouth, RAF Lydd	LAA Squadron
2892 Squadron RAF Regiment	July 1943 - April 1945	RAF Exmouth, RAF Rye	LAA Squadron
2893 Squadron RAF Regiment	October 1942 - October 1944	RAF Ludham, RAF Bognor	LAA Squadron
2894 Squadron RAF Regiment	June 1943 - June 1945	RAF Tangmere, RAF Rye; RAF Llanbedr	LAA Squadron
2895 Squadron RAF Regiment	June - October 1943	RAF Hastings, RAF Gatwick	LAA Squadron
2896 Squadron RAF Regiment	January 1945 - June 1946	UK, Bombay, Agartala, Chittagong, Madras, Singapore	Field Squadron
2897 Squadron RAF Regiment	August 1944 -	Versailles, Buckeburg, Bad Eilsen	Rifle Squadron
2898 Squadron RAF Regiment		RAF Manston	
2899 Squadron RAF Regiment	June - October 1943	RAF North Luffenham, RAF North Coates	LAA Squadron

==== 2900-2999 ====
Squadron	Years active	Home bases	Notes
2900 Squadron RAF Regiment	May 1943 - November 1944	Heliopolis, Gaza, Hadera, Alexandria, Italy, Brindisi, Campomarino, Pescara, San Servero, Acerra	LAA Squadron
2901 Squadron RAF Regiment	May 1943 - March 1944	Abu Sueir, Beirut, Cos, Castelrosso, Cyprus, Famagusta, Lakatamia, Haifa, Hadera, Aleppo	Field Squadron
2902 Squadron RAF Regiment	May 1943 - August 1944	Helwan, Beirut, Aleppo, Kabrit, Gaza, Hadera	Field Squadron
2902 Squadron RAF Regiment	August 1944 -	Italy, Taranto, Barese, Greece, Kalamaki, Pireaus, Hassani, Crete, Egypt	LAA Squadron
2903 Squadron RAF Regiment	May 1943 - March 1944	Aboukir, Beirut, Hadera, Aleppo	Field Squadron
2904 Squadron RAF Regiment	May 1943 - July 1943	Shallufa, Sicily	Field Squadron
2904 Squadron RAF Regiment	July 1943 - February 1944	Sicily, Syracuse, Lentini West, Catania, Italy, Reggio, Bari, Foggia, Termoli, Canne, Campomarino, Vasto	LAA Squadron
2905 Squadron RAF Regiment	May 1943 - November 1943	El Khanka, Mersa Matruh, Tobruk, Benghazi, Tripoli, Kairouan, Hani West, Hammamet, Tunis	Field Squadron
2905 Squadron RAF Regiment	November 1943 -	Tunis, Italy, Naples, Tortorella, Cerignola, Naples, UK	LAA Squadron
2906 Squadron RAF Regiment	May 1943 -	Shallufa, Sicily	Field Squadron
2906 Squadron RAF Regiment	July 1943 - January 1944	Sicily, Syracuse, Lentini East, Catania, Italy, Reggio, Salerno, Naples, Capodichino, Foggia	LAA Squadron
2907 Squadron RAF Regiment	May 1943 - November 1944	Cairo West, Hadera, Haifa, Castelrosso, Haifa, Aleppo, Hadera, Almaza, Mersa Matruh, Aboukir, Italy, Taranto, Foggia, Steraparone, Acerra	LAA Squadron
2908 Squadron RAF Regiment	May 1943 -	Hadera, Aleppo, Kabrit, Aleppo, Alexandria, Italy, Palestine, Lydda, Ein Shemer, Italy, Taranto, Bari, Altamura, Greece, Katakolon, Patras, Athens, Glifada, Hassani, Crete, Athens, Palestine	Field Squadron
2909 Squadron RAF Regiment	May 1943 - October 1943	Gianallis, Hadera	LAA Squadron
2910 Squadron RAF Regiment	May 1943 - May 1944	Idku, Hadera	LAA Squadron
2911 Squadron RAF Regiment	May 1943 - March 1944	Mersa Matruh	Field Squadron
2912 Squadron RAF Regiment	May 1943 - April 1944	Port Said, Gaza	LAA Squadron
2913 Squadron RAF Regiment	May 1943 - November 1944	El Agoud, Gaza, Hadera, Alexandria, Italy, Taranto, Cutella, San Vito, Fermo, Falconara, Naples	LAA Squadron
2914 Squadron RAF Regiment	May 1943 - March 1946	Shallufa, Bersis, Tobruk, Apollonia, Italy, Taranto, Foggia, San Servero, Biferno, Bari, Yugoslavia, Prykos, Austria, Udine, Moderndorf, Graz	LAA Squadron
2915 Squadron RAF Regiment	May 1943 - November 1944	El Adem, Almaza, Hadera, Hose Ravi, Tura, Gaza, Italy, Taranto, Cutella, Sinello, Loreto, Iese, Naples	LAA Squadron
2916 Squadron RAF Regiment	May 1943 -	Gambut, Hadera, Gaza	LAA Squadron
2917 Squadron RAF Regiment	May 1943 - March 1944	Savoia, Alba, Apollonia	LAA Squadron
2918 Squadron RAF Regiment	May 1943 - April 1944	Benina, Shallufa, Hadera, Aleppo, Minnick, Hadera	Field Squadron
2919 Squadron RAF Regiment	May 1943 - March 1944	Berka	Field Squadron
2920 Squadron RAF Regiment	May 1943 - May 1944	Gardabia, Misurata, Tripoli, Hadera, Damascus, Masmiya	LAA Squadron
2921 Squadron RAF Regiment	May 1943 - April 1944	Mellaha, Gaza East, Hadera	LAA Squadron
2922 Squadron RAF Regiment	May 1943 - April 1944	Misurata, Tripoli, Gaza East, Hadera	LAA Squadron
2923 Squadron RAF Regiment	May 1943 - March 1945	Castel Benito, Benina, Apollonia, Almaza, Italy, Altamura, Canne, Greece, Araxos, Piraeus, Kalamaki, Glifada, Klim, Kifissia Palestine	LAA Squadron
2923 Squadron RAF Regiment	March 1945 - April 1946	Italy, San Spirito, Ramleh, Jerusalem, Lydda, Ras el Ein	Field Squadron
2924 Squadron RAF Regiment	May 1943 -	Latakamia, Castelrosso, Aleppo, Kabit, Italy, Taranto, San Spirito, Altamura, Greece, Athens, Kalamaki, Salonika, Sedes, Palestine	Field Squadron
2925 Squadron RAF Regiment	May 1943 - November 1943	Hadera, Sicily, Pachino, Lentini East, Catania, Italy, Grottaglie, Gioia del Colle, Foggia	LAA Squadron
2926 Squadron RAF Regiment	May 1943 - March 1946	Benghazi, Hadera, Apollonia, Italy, Taranto, Altamura, Biferno, Greece, Piraeus, Hassani, Elleniko, Araxos, Kifissia, Patras, Austria, Klagenfurt, Graz	LAA Squadron
2927 Squadron RAF Regiment	May 1943 - April 1944	Habbaniya, Benghazi, Apollonia	LAA Squadron
2928 Squadron RAF Regiment	June 1943 - June 1944	Habbaniya, Hadera	LAA Squadron
2929 Squadron RAF Regiment	September 1943 - January 1944	Habbaniya, Gaza East	LAA Squadron
2930 Squadron RAF Regiment	February 1943 - April 1944	Castel Benito, Mareth, Gabes, Azizia, Benghazi, Khanka, Helwan, Gaza East, Hadera	LAA Squadron
2931 Squadron RAF Regiment	March 1943 - April 1944	Castel Benito, Tripoli, Palestine	LAA Squadron
2932 Squadron RAF Regiment	April 1943 - March 1946	Castel Benito, Gaza East, Beit Daras, Minnick, Italy, Taranto, Foggia, Regina, Termoli, Canne, Bari, Yugoslavia, Vis, Italy, Ancona, Ravenna, Austria, Udine, Klagenfurt, Moderndorf, Graz	LAA Squadron
2933 Squadron RAF Regiment	May 1943 - November 1944	Castel Benito, Berka, Lete, Tura, Hadera, Affise, Masmiya, Italy, Taranto, Tortorella, Foggia, Naples	LAA Squadron
2934 Squadron RAF Regiment	May 1943 -	Malta, Luqa, Hal Far, Ta Kali, UK	LAA Squadron
2935 Squadron RAF Regiment	May 1943 - June 1944	Aleppo, Hadera	LAA Squadron
2941 Squadron RAF Regiment	April 1943 - July 1946	Secunderabad, Imphal, Kangla, Ondauk, Meiktila, Mingaladon, Malaya, Kuala Lumpur	Field Squadron
2942 Squadron RAF Regiment	May 1943 - June 1946	Secunderabad, Comilla, Maungdaw, Chittagong, Rangoon, Mingaladon	Field Squadron
2943 Squadron RAF Regiment	May 1943 - March 1946	Secunderabad, Jessore, Palel, Saudang, Toungoo, Madras, Java, Batavia, Kemajoran	Field Squadron
2944 Squadron RAF Regiment	June 1943 - January 1946	Secunderabad, Chittagong, Imphal, Palel, Yalagyo, Taukkyan, Sinthe, Magwe, Meiktila, Singapore, Tanglin	Field Squadron
2945 Squadron RAF Regiment	June 1943 - June 1946	Secunderabad, St Paul's Island, Maungdaw, Ondauk, Ondaw, Rangoon, Bangkok, Dom Muang	Field Squadron
2946 Squadron RAF Regiment	July 1943 - January 1946	Secunderabad, Chittagong, Maungdaw, Tullihal, Sinthe	Field Squadron
2947 Squadron RAF Regiment	June 1943 - March 1945	RAF Longcross, RAF Filey, RAF Sennen	LAA Squadron
2948 Squadron RAF Regiment	February 1944 - April 1945	RAF Ventor, RAF Swingate	LAA Squadron
2949 Squadron RAF Regiment	May - October 1945	Stavanger, Sola, Gardemoen, Fornebu	Rifle Squadron
2950 Squadron RAF Regiment	July 1943 - March 1945	RAF Longcross, RAF Brandy Bay	LAA Squadron
2951 Squadron RAF Regiment	August 1943 - March 1945	RAF Trueleigh Hill, RAF Rye	LAA Squadron
2952 Squadron RAF Regiment	August 1943 - October 1943	RAF North Luffenham, RAF Netheravon	LAA Squadron
2953 Squadron RAF Regiment	June 1943 - October 1943	RAF Wellingore, RAF Bolt Head	LAA Squadron
2954 Squadron RAF Regiment	June 1943 - September 1945	RAF Driffield, RAF Leuchars, Lagens Airfield, Azores, UK; RAF Davidstow Moor	LAA Squadron
2955 Squadron RAF Regiment	June - April 1945	St Athan, RAF Hawkinge; RAF Davidstow Moor	LAA Squadron
2956 Squadron RAF Regiment	June - November 1943	RAF Waddington, RAF Merston	LAA Squadron
2957 Squadron RAF Regiment	July 1943 - June 1944	RAF Locking, RAF Waterbeach	LAA Squadron
2958 Squadron RAF Regiment	May 1944 - January 1946	Secunderabad, Chittagong, Palel, Tamu, Kalemyo, Sinthe, Magwe, Rangoon, Warangal	LAA Squadron
2959 Squadron RAF Regiment	June 1944 - January 1946	Secunderabad, Agartala, Cox's Bazar, Patenga, Ramree, Rangoon, Mingaladon, Warangal	LAA Squadron
2960 Squadron RAF Regiment	June 1944 - May 1946	Secunderabad, Imphal, Ondauk, Ondaw, Dwhela, Rangoon, Penang	LAA Squadron
2961 Squadron RAF Regiment	July 1944 - January 1946	Secunderabad, Dimapur, Tullihal, Palel, Tabingaung, Saudang, Rangoon, Sumatra, Medan	LAA Squadron
2962 Squadron RAF Regiment	July 1944 - August 1946	Secunderabad, Cocos Islands, Colombo, Madras, Java, Batavia, Kemajoran	LAA Squadron
2963 Squadron RAF Regiment	August 1944 - March 1946	Secunderabad, Cox's Bazar, Ramree, Imphal, Yalagyo, Meiktila, Toungoo, Hmwabi, Saigon	LAA Squadron
2964 Squadron RAF Regiment	August 1944 - March 1946	Secunderabad, Dimapur, Alipore, Toungoo, Rangoon, Penang, Singapore	LAA Squadron
2965 Squadron RAF Regiment	August 1944 - March 1946	Secunderabad, Imphal, Meiktila, Toungoo, Rangoon, Penang, Butterworth, Singapore, Tanglin	LAA Squadron
2966 Squadron RAF Regiment	August 1944 - March 1946	Secunderabad, Comilla, Dohazari, Akyab, Madras, Singapore, Seletar	Field Squadron
2967 Squadron RAF Regiment	September 1944 - February 1946	Secunderabad, Dohazari, Chiringa, Ramree, Rangoon, Saigon	Field Squadron
2968 Squadron RAF Regiment	September 1944 - January 1946	Secunderabad, Tullihal, Imphal, Mutaik, Ondauk, Meiktila, Mingaladon, Rangoon, Sumatra, Medan	Field Squadron
2969 Squadron RAF Regiment	March 1945 - April 1946	Italy, Acerra, Palestine, Jerusalem, Petat Tiqva	Rifle Squadron
2970 Squadron RAF Regiment	February 1945 - April 1946	Secunderabad, Agartala, Rangoon, Mingaladon	Armoured Car Squadron
2971 Squadron RAF Regiment	February 1945 - March 1946	Secunderabad	Armoured Car Squadron
2972 Squadron RAF Regiment	February 1945 - March 1946	Secunderabad	Armoured Car Squadron

=== RAuxAF Regiment Squadrons ===
Squadron	Dates	Locations	Notes
2501 (County of Gloucester)	1 May 1947 - 10 March 1957	Filton	
2502 (Ulster)	1 December 1947 - 10 March 1957	Aldergrove	
2504 (County of Nottingham)	1 December 1947 - 10 March 1957	Hucknall	
2600 (City of London)	1 December 1947 - 10 March 1957	Biggin Hill	
2602 (City of Glasgow)	1 December 1947 - 10 March 1957	Bishopbriggs	
2603 (City of Edinburgh)	1 December 1947 - 10 March 1957	Turnhouse	
2604 (County of Middlesex)	1 May 1947 - 1 June 1949	Stanmore Park	Became 2600 Squadron
2605 (County of Warwick)	1 May 1947 - 10 March 1957	Honiley	
2608 (North Riding)	1 December 1947 - 10 March 1957	Thornaby	
2609 (West Riding)	1 May 1947 - 10 March 1957	Yeadon	
2611 (West Lancashire)	1 October 1947 - 10 March 1957	Woodvale	
2612 (City of Aberdeen)	1 December 1947 - 10 March 1957	Dyce	
2616 (South Yorkshire)	1 December 1947 - 10 March 1957	Doncaster	
2625 (County of Cornwall)	1 November 1982 - Unknown	St Mawgan	
2729 (City of Lincoln)	1 April 1985 - Unknown	Waddington	
2890	1 October 1989 - Unknown	Waddington	

=== RAuxAF Regiment Wings ===
Wing	Dates	Locations	Notes
1310	13 June 1989 - Unknown	Catterick	
1339	1 October 1989 - Unknown	Waddington	

=== Anti-Aircraft Flights ===
Flight	Years active	Home bases	Notes
4000 Anti-Aircraft Flight RAF Regiment			
4001 Anti-Aircraft Flight RAF Regiment		RAF Merston, RAF Westhampnett	
4002 Anti-Aircraft Flight RAF Regiment			
4003 Anti-Aircraft Flight RAF Regiment			
4004 Anti-Aircraft Flight RAF Regiment			
4005 Anti-Aircraft Flight RAF Regiment			
4006 Anti-Aircraft Flight RAF Regiment		RAF Lympne	
4007 Anti-Aircraft Flight RAF Regiment			
4008 Anti-Aircraft Flight RAF Regiment			
4009 Anti-Aircraft Flight RAF Regiment			
4010 Anti-Aircraft Flight RAF Regiment			
4011 Anti-Aircraft Flight RAF Regiment			
4012 Anti-Aircraft Flight RAF Regiment		RAF Hornchurch	
4014 Anti-Aircraft Flight RAF Regiment			
4015 Anti-Aircraft Flight RAF Regiment			
4016 Anti-Aircraft Flight RAF Regiment		RAF Lympne, RAF Merston, RAF Tangmere	
4017 Anti-Aircraft Flight RAF Regiment			
4018 Anti-Aircraft Flight RAF Regiment		RAF North Weald	
4019 Anti-Aircraft Flight RAF Regiment			
4020 Anti-Aircraft Flight RAF Regiment			
4021 Anti-Aircraft Flight RAF Regiment		RAF North Weald	
4022 Anti-Aircraft Flight RAF Regiment			
4023 Anti-Aircraft Flight RAF Regiment			
4024 Anti-Aircraft Flight RAF Regiment			
4025 Anti-Aircraft Flight RAF Regiment			
4026 Anti-Aircraft Flight RAF Regiment			
4027 Anti-Aircraft Flight RAF Regiment			
4028 Anti-Aircraft Flight RAF Regiment			
4029 Anti-Aircraft Flight RAF Regiment			
4030 Anti-Aircraft Flight RAF Regiment			
4031 Anti-Aircraft Flight RAF Regiment			
4032 Anti-Aircraft Flight RAF Regiment			
4033 Anti-Aircraft Flight RAF Regiment			
4034 Anti-Aircraft Flight RAF Regiment			
4035 Anti-Aircraft Flight RAF Regiment			
4036 Anti-Aircraft Flight RAF Regiment			
4037 Anti-Aircraft Flight RAF Regiment			
4038 Anti-Aircraft Flight RAF Regiment			
4039 Anti-Aircraft Flight RAF Regiment			
4040 Anti-Aircraft Flight RAF Regiment			
4041 Anti-Aircraft Flight RAF Regiment			
4042 Anti-Aircraft Flight RAF Regiment			
4043 Anti-Aircraft Flight RAF Regiment		RAF Ibsley	
4044 Anti-Aircraft Flight RAF Regiment		RAF Langham	
4045 Anti-Aircraft Flight RAF Regiment		RAF Biggin Hill	
4046 Anti-Aircraft Flight RAF Regiment			
4047 Anti-Aircraft Flight RAF Regiment			
4048 Anti-Aircraft Flight RAF Regiment			
4049 Anti-Aircraft Flight RAF Regiment			
4050 Anti-Aircraft Flight RAF Regiment			
4051 Anti-Aircraft Flight RAF Regiment			
4052 Anti-Aircraft Flight RAF Regiment			
4053 Anti-Aircraft Flight RAF Regiment			
4054 Anti-Aircraft Flight RAF Regiment		RAF Langham	
4055 Anti-Aircraft Flight RAF Regiment			
4056 Anti-Aircraft Flight RAF Regiment			
4057 Anti-Aircraft Flight RAF Regiment			
4058 Anti-Aircraft Flight RAF Regiment			
4059 Anti-Aircraft Flight RAF Regiment			
4060 Anti-Aircraft Flight RAF Regiment			
4061 Anti-Aircraft Flight RAF Regiment			
4062 Anti-Aircraft Flight RAF Regiment			
4063 Anti-Aircraft Flight RAF Regiment			
4064 Anti-Aircraft Flight RAF Regiment			
4065 Anti-Aircraft Flight RAF Regiment		RAF Friston	
4066 Anti-Aircraft Flight RAF Regiment			
4067 Anti-Aircraft Flight RAF Regiment		RAF Tangmere, RAF Westhampnett	
4068 Anti-Aircraft Flight RAF Regiment			
4069 Anti-Aircraft Flight RAF Regiment			
4070 Anti-Aircraft Flight RAF Regiment			
4071 Anti-Aircraft Flight RAF Regiment			
4072 Anti-Aircraft Flight RAF Regiment			
4073 Anti-Aircraft Flight RAF Regiment			
4074 Anti-Aircraft Flight RAF Regiment			
4075 Anti-Aircraft Flight RAF Regiment			
4076 Anti-Aircraft Flight RAF Regiment			
4077 Anti-Aircraft Flight RAF Regiment			
4078 Anti-Aircraft Flight RAF Regiment			
4079 Anti-Aircraft Flight RAF Regiment			
4080 Anti-Aircraft Flight RAF Regiment			
4081 Anti-Aircraft Flight RAF Regiment			
4082 Anti-Aircraft Flight RAF Regiment			
4083 Anti-Aircraft Flight RAF Regiment			
4084 Anti-Aircraft Flight RAF Regiment			
4085 Anti-Aircraft Flight RAF Regiment		RAF West Malling	
4086 Anti-Aircraft Flight RAF Regiment			
4087 Anti-Aircraft Flight RAF Regiment			
4088 Independent Anti-Aircraft Flight RAF Regiment	August 1942	RAF Douglas, Algiers, La Marsa	Became 2860 LAA Regiment
4089 Independent Anti-Aircraft Flight RAF Regiment	August 1942	RAF Douglas, Algiers, Bone, La Marsa	Became 2865 LAA Regiment
4090 Independent Anti-Aircraft Flight RAF Regiment	August 1942	RAF Douglas, Algiers, La Marsa	Became 2861 LAA Regiment
4091 Independent Anti-Aircraft Flight RAF Regiment	August 1942	RAF Douglas, Algiers, Medjez el Bab, Ferryville, La Marsa	Became 2861 LAA Regiment
4092 Independent Anti-Aircraft Flight RAF Regiment	August 1942	RAF Douglas, Algiers, Cap Serrat, Medjez el Bab, Gharmart	Became 2862 LAA Regiment
4093 Anti-Aircraft Flight RAF Regiment			
4094 Anti-Aircraft Flight RAF Regiment			
4095 Anti-Aircraft Flight RAF Regiment			
4096 Anti-Aircraft Flight RAF Regiment			
4097 Anti-Aircraft Flight RAF Regiment			
4098 Anti-Aircraft Flight RAF Regiment			
4099 Anti-Aircraft Flight RAF Regiment			
4100 Anti-Aircraft Flight RAF Regiment			
4101 Anti-Aircraft Flight RAF Regiment		RAF Bradwell Bay	
4102 Anti-Aircraft Flight RAF Regiment			
4103 Anti-Aircraft Flight RAF Regiment			
4104 Anti-Aircraft Flight RAF Regiment			
4105 Anti-Aircraft Flight RAF Regiment			
4106 Anti-Aircraft Flight RAF Regiment			
4107 Anti-Aircraft Flight RAF Regiment			
4108 Anti-Aircraft Flight RAF Regiment			
4109 Anti-Aircraft Flight RAF Regiment		RAF Manorbier	
4110 Anti-Aircraft Flight RAF Regiment			
4111 Anti-Aircraft Flight RAF Regiment			
4112 Anti-Aircraft Flight RAF Regiment			
4114 Anti-Aircraft Flight RAF Regiment			
4115 Anti-Aircraft Flight RAF Regiment			
4116 Anti-Aircraft Flight RAF Regiment			
4117 Anti-Aircraft Flight RAF Regiment			
4118 Anti-Aircraft Flight RAF Regiment			
4119 Anti-Aircraft Flight RAF Regiment			
4120 Anti-Aircraft Flight RAF Regiment			
4121 Anti-Aircraft Flight RAF Regiment			
4122 Anti-Aircraft Flight RAF Regiment			
4123 Anti-Aircraft Flight RAF Regiment			
4124 Anti-Aircraft Flight RAF Regiment			
4125 Anti-Aircraft Flight RAF Regiment			
4126 Anti-Aircraft Flight RAF Regiment			
4127 Anti-Aircraft Flight RAF Regiment			
4128 Anti-Aircraft Flight RAF Regiment			
4129 Anti-Aircraft Flight RAF Regiment			
4130 Anti-Aircraft Flight RAF Regiment			
4131 Anti-Aircraft Flight RAF Regiment			
4132 Anti-Aircraft Flight RAF Regiment			
4133 Anti-Aircraft Flight RAF Regiment			
4134 Anti-Aircraft Flight RAF Regiment			
4135 Anti-Aircraft Flight RAF Regiment			
4136 Anti-Aircraft Flight RAF Regiment			
4137 Anti-Aircraft Flight RAF Regiment			
4138 Anti-Aircraft Flight RAF Regiment		RAF Fairwood Common	
4139 Anti-Aircraft Flight RAF Regiment			
4140 Anti-Aircraft Flight RAF Regiment			
4141 Anti-Aircraft Flight RAF Regiment			
4142 Anti-Aircraft Flight RAF Regiment			
4143 Anti-Aircraft Flight RAF Regiment			
4144 Anti-Aircraft Flight RAF Regiment			
4145 Anti-Aircraft Flight RAF Regiment			
4146 Anti-Aircraft Flight RAF Regiment			
4147 Anti-Aircraft Flight RAF Regiment			
4148 Anti-Aircraft Flight RAF Regiment			
4149 Anti-Aircraft Flight RAF Regiment		RAF Langham	
4150 Anti-Aircraft Flight RAF Regiment			
4151 Anti-Aircraft Flight RAF Regiment			
4152 Anti-Aircraft Flight RAF Regiment			
4153 Anti-Aircraft Flight RAF Regiment			
4154 Anti-Aircraft Flight RAF Regiment			
4155 Anti-Aircraft Flight RAF Regiment			
4156 Anti-Aircraft Flight RAF Regiment		RAF Blackbushe	
4157 Anti-Aircraft Flight RAF Regiment			
4158 Anti-Aircraft Flight RAF Regiment			
4159 Anti-Aircraft Flight RAF Regiment			
4160 Anti-Aircraft Flight RAF Regiment			
4180 Anti-Aircraft Flight RAF Regiment			
4181 Anti-Aircraft Flight RAF Regiment			
4182 Anti-Aircraft Flight RAF Regiment			
4183 Anti-Aircraft Flight RAF Regiment		RAF Sibson	
4184 Anti-Aircraft Flight RAF Regiment			
4185 Anti-Aircraft Flight RAF Regiment			
4186 Anti-Aircraft Flight RAF Regiment		RAF West Malling	
4187 Anti-Aircraft Flight RAF Regiment			
4188 Anti-Aircraft Flight RAF Regiment			
4189 Anti-Aircraft Flight RAF Regiment			
4190 Anti-Aircraft Flight RAF Regiment			
4191 Anti-Aircraft Flight RAF Regiment			
4192 Anti-Aircraft Flight RAF Regiment			
4193 Anti-Aircraft Flight RAF Regiment			
4194 Anti-Aircraft Flight RAF Regiment			
4195 Anti-Aircraft Flight RAF Regiment			
4196 Anti-Aircraft Flight RAF Regiment			
4197 Anti-Aircraft Flight RAF Regiment			
4198 Anti-Aircraft Flight RAF Regiment			
4199 Anti-Aircraft Flight RAF Regiment		RAF Swanton Morley	
4200 Anti-Aircraft Flight RAF Regiment			
4201 Anti-Aircraft Flight RAF Regiment			
4202 Anti-Aircraft Flight RAF Regiment			
4203 Anti-Aircraft Flight RAF Regiment			
4204 Anti-Aircraft Flight RAF Regiment			
4205 Anti-Aircraft Flight RAF Regiment			
4206 Anti-Aircraft Flight RAF Regiment			
4207 Anti-Aircraft Flight RAF Regiment			
4208 Anti-Aircraft Flight RAF Regiment			
4209 Anti-Aircraft Flight RAF Regiment			
4210 Anti-Aircraft Flight RAF Regiment			
4211 Anti-Aircraft Flight RAF Regiment			
4212 Anti-Aircraft Flight RAF Regiment			
4214 Anti-Aircraft Flight RAF Regiment		RAF Swanton Morley	
4215 Anti-Aircraft Flight RAF Regiment			
4216 Anti-Aircraft Flight RAF Regiment			
4217 Anti-Aircraft Flight RAF Regiment			
4218 Anti-Aircraft Flight RAF Regiment			
4219 Anti-Aircraft Flight RAF Regiment			
4220 Anti-Aircraft Flight RAF Regiment			
4221 Anti-Aircraft Flight RAF Regiment			
4222 Anti-Aircraft Flight RAF Regiment			
4223 Anti-Aircraft Flight RAF Regiment			
4224 Anti-Aircraft Flight RAF Regiment			
4225 Anti-Aircraft Flight RAF Regiment			
4226 Anti-Aircraft Flight RAF Regiment			
4227 Anti-Aircraft Flight RAF Regiment			
4228 Anti-Aircraft Flight RAF Regiment			
4229 Anti-Aircraft Flight RAF Regiment			
4230 Anti-Aircraft Flight RAF Regiment			
4231 Anti-Aircraft Flight RAF Regiment			
4232 Anti-Aircraft Flight RAF Regiment			
4233 Anti-Aircraft Flight RAF Regiment			
4234 Anti-Aircraft Flight RAF Regiment			
4235 Anti-Aircraft Flight RAF Regiment			
4236 Anti-Aircraft Flight RAF Regiment			
4237 Anti-Aircraft Flight RAF Regiment			
4238 Anti-Aircraft Flight RAF Regiment			
4239 Anti-Aircraft Flight RAF Regiment			
4240 Anti-Aircraft Flight RAF Regiment			
4241 Anti-Aircraft Flight RAF Regiment			
4242 Anti-Aircraft Flight RAF Regiment			
4243 Anti-Aircraft Flight RAF Regiment			
4244 Anti-Aircraft Flight RAF Regiment			
4245 Anti-Aircraft Flight RAF Regiment			
4246 Anti-Aircraft Flight RAF Regiment			
4247 Anti-Aircraft Flight RAF Regiment			
4248 Anti-Aircraft Flight RAF Regiment			
4249 Anti-Aircraft Flight RAF Regiment			
4250 Anti-Aircraft Flight RAF Regiment			
4251 Anti-Aircraft Flight RAF Regiment			
4252 Anti-Aircraft Flight RAF Regiment			
4253 Anti-Aircraft Flight RAF Regiment			
4254 Anti-Aircraft Flight RAF Regiment			
4255 Anti-Aircraft Flight RAF Regiment			
4256 Anti-Aircraft Flight RAF Regiment			
4257 Anti-Aircraft Flight RAF Regiment			
4258 Anti-Aircraft Flight RAF Regiment			
4259 Anti-Aircraft Flight RAF Regiment			
4260 Anti-Aircraft Flight RAF Regiment		RAF Tangmere	
4337 Independent Anti-Aircraft Flight RAF Regiment	February - May/June 1943	North Africa	Became 2861 LAA Regiment
4338 Independent Anti-Aircraft Flight RAF Regiment	February - May/June 1943	North Africa	Became 2860 LAA Regiment
4339 Independent Anti-Aircraft Flight RAF Regiment	February - May/June 1943	North Africa	Became 2862 LAA Regiment
4340 Independent Anti-Aircraft Flight RAF Regiment	February - May/June 1943	North Africa	
4341 Independent Anti-Aircraft Flight RAF Regiment	February - May/June 1943	North Africa	Became 2864 LAA Regiment
4342 Independent Anti-Aircraft Flight RAF Regiment	February - May/June 1943	North Africa	Became 2865 LAA Regiment
4343 Independent Anti-Aircraft Flight RAF Regiment	February - May/June 1943	North Africa	Became 2867 LAA Regiment
4344 Independent Anti-Aircraft Flight RAF Regiment	February - May/June 1943	North Africa	Became 2862 LAA Regiment
4345 Independent Anti-Aircraft Flight RAF Regiment	February - May/June 1943	North Africa	Became 2866 LAA Regiment
4346 Independent Anti-Aircraft Flight RAF Regiment	February - May/June 1943	North Africa	Became 2863 LAA Regiment
4347 Independent Anti-Aircraft Flight RAF Regiment	February - May/June 1943	North Africa	Became 2864 LAA Regiment
4348 Independent Anti-Aircraft Flight RAF Regiment	February - May/June 1943	North Africa	Became 2868 LAA Regiment
4349 Independent Anti-Aircraft Flight RAF Regiment	February - May/June 1943	North Africa	Became 2868 LAA Regiment
4350 Independent Anti-Aircraft Flight RAF Regiment	February - May/June 1943	North Africa	Became 2866 LAA Regiment
4351 Independent Anti-Aircraft Flight RAF Regiment	February - May/June 1943	North Africa	Became 2865 LAA Regiment
4352 Independent Anti-Aircraft Flight RAF Regiment	February - May/June 1943	North Africa	Became 2866 LAA Regiment
4353 Independent Anti-Aircraft Flight RAF Regiment	February - May/June 1943	North Africa	Became 2868 LAA Regiment
4354 Independent Anti-Aircraft Flight RAF Regiment	February - May/June 1943	North Africa	Became 2870 LAA Regiment
4355 Independent Anti-Aircraft Flight RAF Regiment	February - May/June 1943	North Africa	Became 2869 LAA Regiment
4356 Independent Anti-Aircraft Flight RAF Regiment	February - May/June 1943	North Africa	Became 2864 LAA Regiment
4357 Independent Anti-Aircraft Flight RAF Regiment	February - May/June 1943	North Africa	Became 2869 LAA Regiment
4358 Independent Anti-Aircraft Flight RAF Regiment	February - May/June 1943	North Africa	Became 2869 LAA Regiment
4359 Independent Anti-Aircraft Flight RAF Regiment	February - May/June 1943	North Africa	
4360 Independent Anti-Aircraft Flight RAF Regiment	February - May/June 1943	North Africa	

== See also ==
Royal Air Force

- List of Royal Air Force aircraft squadrons
- List of Royal Air Force aircraft independent flights
- List of conversion units of the Royal Air Force
- List of Royal Air Force Glider units
- List of Royal Air Force Operational Training Units
- List of Royal Air Force schools
- List of Royal Air Force units & establishments
- List of RAF squadron codes
- List of RAF Regiment units
- List of Battle of Britain squadrons
- List of wings of the Royal Air Force
- Royal Air Force roundels

Army Air Corps

- List of Army Air Corps aircraft units

Fleet Air Arm

- List of Fleet Air Arm aircraft squadrons
- List of Fleet Air Arm groups
- List of aircraft units of the Royal Navy
- List of aircraft wings of the Royal Navy

Others

- List of Air Training Corps squadrons
- University Air Squadron
- Air Experience Flight
- Volunteer Gliding Squadron
- United Kingdom military aircraft registration number
- United Kingdom aircraft test serials
- British military aircraft designation systems
