= Tip Tipping =

English stunt performer and actor (1958–1993)

- Born: Timothy Tipping; 13 February 1958; England
- Died: 5 February 1993 (aged 34); Brunton, Northumberland, England
- Cause of death: Parachuting accident
- Occupations: Stunt performer, actor
- Years active: 1981–1993
- Known for: Aliens

Timothy "Tip" Tipping (13 February 1958 – 5 February 1993) was an English film and television stuntman and actor.

== Biography ==
Prior to his career as a stuntman, Tipping served in the Royal Marines and 21st SAS Regiment. He appeared in television series such as Doctor Who, The New Statesman, Bottom, The Bill and Poirot, and in films including Never Say Never Again (1983), Batman (1989), Indiana Jones and the Last Crusade (1989) and Aliens (1986, in a credited role as Private Crowe).

Tipping died on 5 February 1993, aged 34, in a parachuting accident at Brunton, near Alnwick, Northumberland, while filming for the BBC documentary series 999. He is interred in the churchyard at the Church of St Peter and St Paul, Wadhurst, East Sussex.

== Filmography ==
Year	Title	Role	Notes
1984	Indiana Jones and the Temple of Doom	Stunts	
1985	Lifeforce	Man Attacked by Zombies	Uncredited
1985	Death Wish 3	Creep	Uncredited
1985	Return to Oz	Stunts	
1986	Aliens	Private Crowe	
1987	Hamburger Hill	Stunts	
1989	Indiana Jones and the Last Crusade	Tank Crewman / First grenade throwing Nazi	Uncredited
1989	Batman	Smylex Poisoned Punk	Uncredited
1991	Twenty-One	Pub Boy	
1991	Robin Hood: Prince of Thieves	Stuntperson	
1992	Blue Ice	Hit Man #2	Uncredited
1993	The Young Americans	Stunts	
