= RAF Lydd =

Former Royal Air Force Advanced Landing Ground in Kent, England

RAF Lydd
- Near Lydd, Kent in England
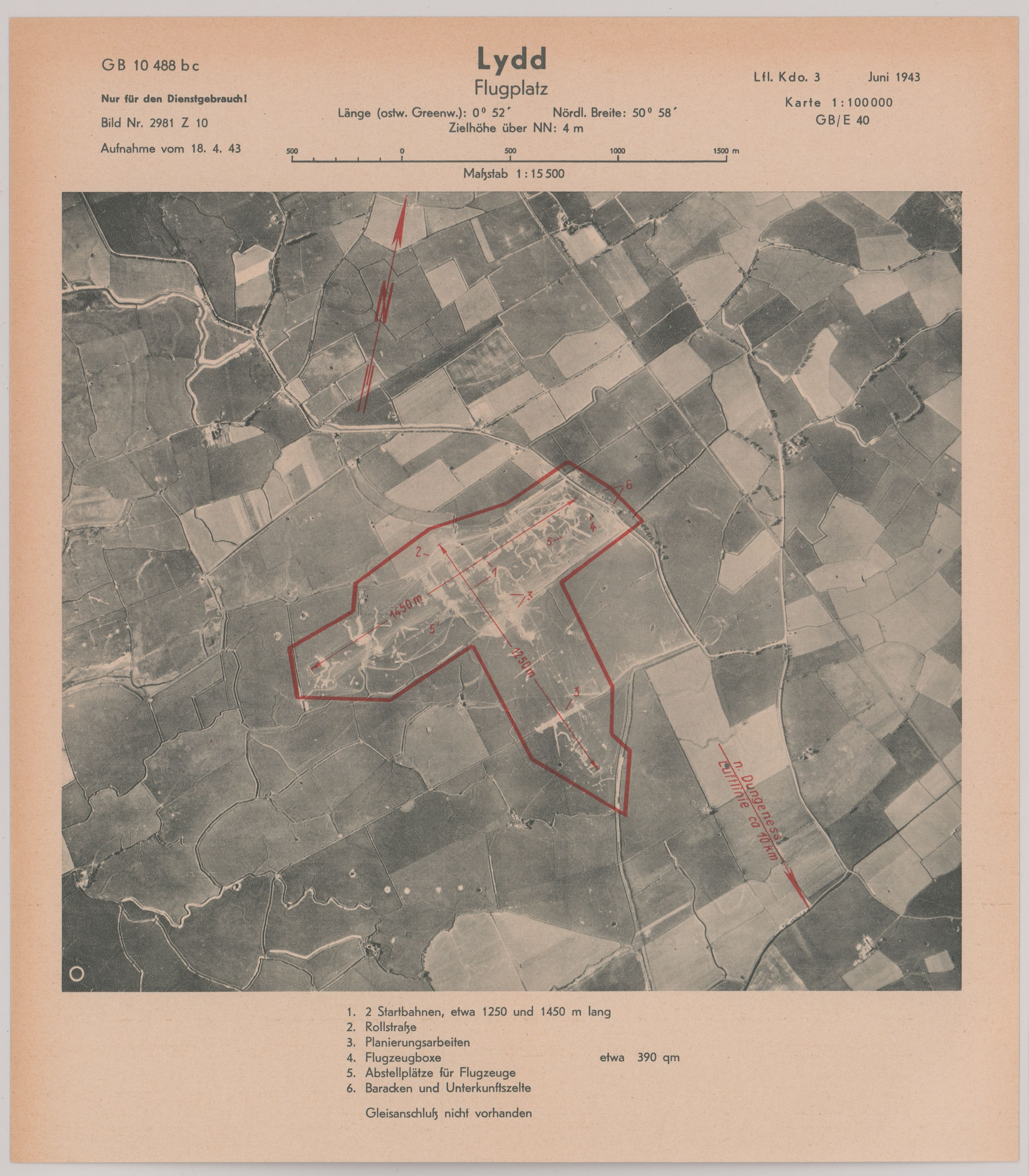
- RAF Lydd on a target dossier of the German Luftwaffe, 1943

Site information
- Type: RAF Advanced landing ground
- Code: LD
- Owner: Air Ministry
- Operator: Royal Air Force
- Controlled by: Second Tactical Air Force * No. 83 Group RAF

Location
- Shown within Kent RAF Lydd (the United Kingdom)
- Coordinates: 50°58′09″N 000°52′18″E

Site history
- Built: 1943
- Built by: RAF Airfield Construction Service
- In use: June 1943 - January 1945
- Battles/wars: European theatre of World War II

Airfield information
- Elevation: 1 metre (3 ft 3 in) AMSL
Runways
Direction	Length and surface
00/00	Sommerfeld tracking
00/00	Sommerfeld tracking

Royal Air Force Lydd or more simply RAF Lydd is a former Royal Air Force Advanced landing ground located 2 miles (3.2 km) north-west of Lydd, Kent and 12.3 miles (19.8 km) south of Ashford, Kent, England.

== History ==
The following units were here at some point using the advanced landing ground:

- No. 121 Airfield Headquarters RAF (July - August 1943)
  - No. 174 (Mauritius) Squadron RAF with the Hawker Typhoon IB (July - October 1943)
  - No. 175 Squadron RAF with the Hawker Typhoon IB (July - October 1943)
  - No. 245 (Northern Rhodesian) Squadron RAF with the Hawker Typhoon IB (July - October 1943)
- No. 2794 Squadron RAF Regiment
- No. 2800 Squadron RAF Regiment
- No. 2845 Squadron RAF Regiment
- No. 2889 Squadron RAF Regiment
- No. 2891 Squadron RAF Regiment
- No. 3205 Servicing Commando
- No. 3206 Servicing Commando

== Current use ==
The site has reverted to farmland and has no connection with the current Lydd Airport which is located to the east of Lydd.

== See also ==
- List of former Royal Air Force stations
