= RAF Brunton =

Former military airfield in Northumberland, England

RAF Brunton
- Near Beadnell, Northumberland in England
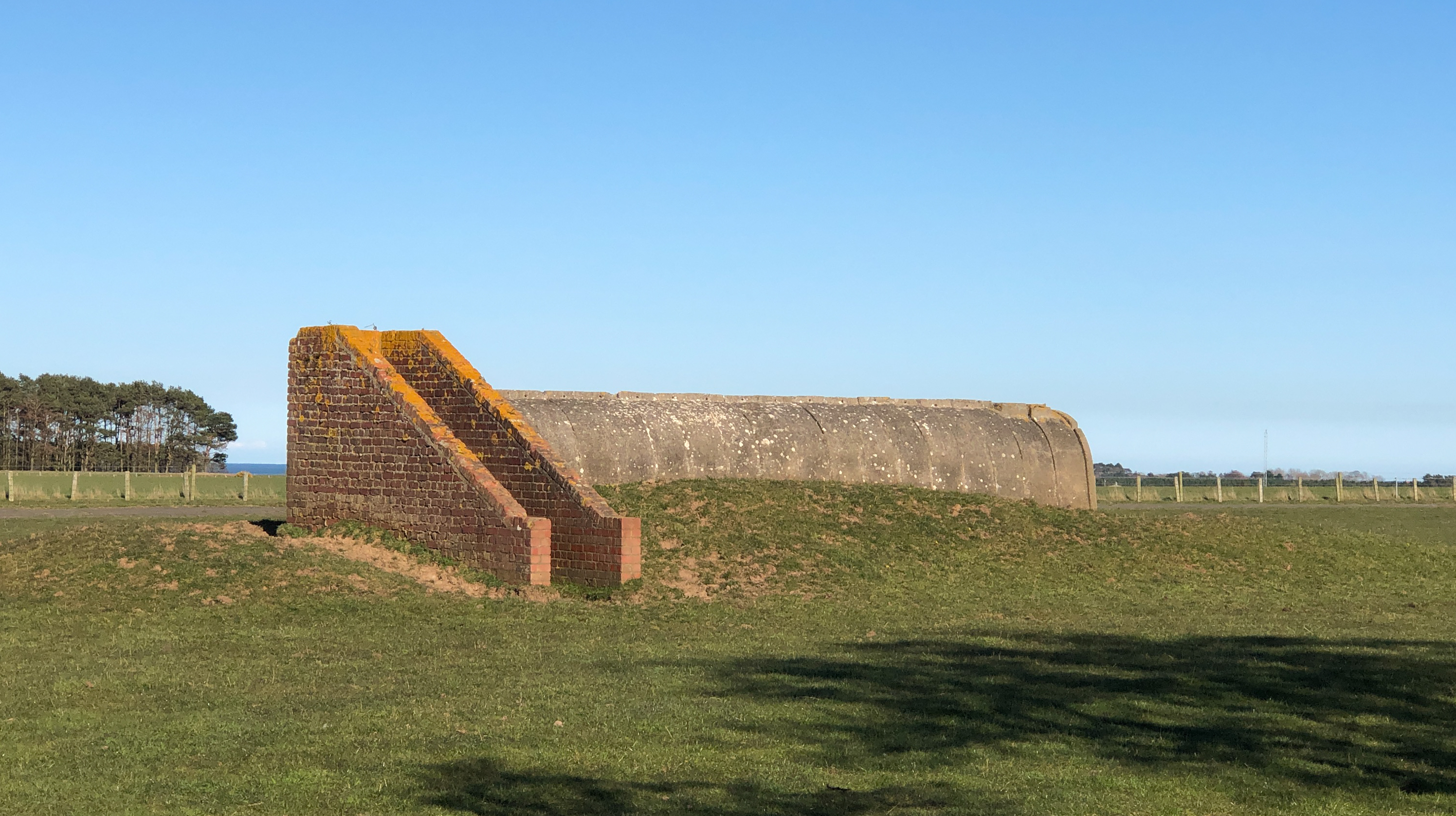
- Wartime shelter on the airfield

Site information
- Type: Royal Air Force satellite station
- Code: BN
- Owner: Air Ministry
- Operator: Royal Air Force
- Controlled by: RAF Fighter Command * No. 9 Group RAF * No. 81 (OTU) Group RAF

Location
- Shown within Northumberland RAF Brunton (the United Kingdom)
- Coordinates: 55°31′28″N 1°40′39″W

Site history
- Built: 1941/42
- In use: August 1942-1945
- Battles/wars: European theatre of World War II

Airfield information
- Elevation: 80 feet (24 m) AMSL
Runways
Direction	Length and surface
02/20	1,400 metres (4,593 ft) Tarmac
08/26	940 metres (3,084 ft) Tarmac
14/32	970 metres (3,182 ft) Tarmac

Royal Air Force Brunton or more simply RAF Brunton is a former Royal Air Force satellite station located close to the hamlet of Brunton, Northumberland, England.

The following units were here at some point:

- Satellite for No. 56 Operational Training Unit RAF (December 1944 - May 1945)
- Satellite for No. 59 OTU (August 1942 - January 1944)
- No. 2772 Squadron RAF Regiment
- No. 2879 Squadron RAF Regiment
- Fighter Leaders School RAF (1944)

== Post-war ==
The field was used for civil aviation after the war and by the Borders Parachute Centre until at least 2003, but was sold and closed soon after that date; in a 2021 accident report it is referred to as a "disused airfield".
