= RAF Worcester =

Former Royal Air Force Relief Landing Ground in Worcestershire, England

RAF Worcester
- Worcester, Worcestershire in England

Site information
- Owner: Air Ministry
- Operator: Royal Air Force
- Controlled by: RAF Flying Training Command

Location
- Shown within Worcestershire
- Coordinates: 52°12′59″N 002°12′14″W

Site history
- Built: 1940
- In use: 1940-1945
- Battles/wars: Second World War

Airfield information
- Elevation: 30 metres (98 ft) AMSL
Runways
Direction	Length and surface
12/30	900 metres (2,953 ft) Grass

Royal Air Force Worcester, or more simply RAF Worcester, is a former Royal Air Force relief landing ground (RLG) which was located 1.7 miles (2.7 km) north east of Worcester city centre, Worcestershire, England and 4.4 miles (7.1 km) south west of Droitwich Spa, Worcestershire. It was also known as RAF Perdiswell.

== Posted units ==
The following units were here at some point:

- No. 2 Elementary Flying Training School RAF (2 EFTS) became No. 6 (Supplementary) Flying Instructors School RAF became No. 6 Flying Instructors School RAF became No. 6 Flying Instructors School (Elementary) RAF became 2 EFTS
- No. 24 Group Communication Flight RAF
- No. 81 Group Communication Flight RAF
- No. 2790 Squadron RAF Regiment

== Accidents and incidents ==
5 June 1940 Bristol Blenheim L1232 of No. 5 Operational Training Unit overshot at night and hit a house.

17 October 1941 de Havilland Tiger Moth T5856 of No. 2 Elementary Flying Training School (EFTS) crashed when landing.

15 July 1942 Miles Magister R1956 of No. 6 Flying Instructors School (FIS) hit a gunpost on take-off.

September 1942 Douglas Dakota en route from Pershore with a film crew crashed blocking the Bilford Road. The co-pilot was the American film actor Clark Gable who was involved with a planned gunnery training film.

16 May 1943 Airspeed Oxford R9983 of No. 15 (Pilots) Advanced Flying Unit RAF crashed on takeoff.

== Postwar ==
Between 1954 and 1968 a Spitfire was used as a gate guard at the site. Since 2005 the spitfire in question has been in the Kelvingrove Art Gallery and Museum in Glasgow.

The airfield has been turned into Perdiswell Park and Ravenmeadow Golf Course.
