= RAF Friston =

Former Royal Air Force satellite station in East Sussex, England

RAF Friston
- Near Friston, East Sussex in England

Site information
- Type: Royal Air Force satellite station
- Code: FX
- Owner: Air Ministry
- Operator: Royal Air Force
- Controlled by: RAF Fighter Command * No. 11 Group RAF

Location
- Shown within East Sussex RAF Friston (the United Kingdom)
- Coordinates: 50°45′53″N 000°10′04″E

Site history
- Built: 1940
- In use: May 1940 - April 1946
- Battles/wars: European theatre of World War II

Airfield information
- Elevation: 108 metres (354 ft) AMSL
Runways
Direction	Length and surface
00/00	Grass
00/00	Grass

Royal Air Force Friston or more simply RAF Friston is a former Royal Air Force satellite station and Emergency Landing Ground located in East Sussex, England.

== Units ==
The following units were here at some point:

- No. 32 Squadron RAF, two visits between 14 June 1942 and 20 August 1942 with Hawker Hurricanes
- No. 41 Squadron RAF, three visits between 27 May 1943 and 11 July 1944 with Supermarine Spitfires
- No. 64 Squadron RAF between 7 August 1943 and 19 August 1943 with Spitfires
- No. 131 (County of Kent) Squadron RAF
- No. 253 (Hyderabad State) Squadron RAF - Its Spitfires arrived on 13 June 1942
- No. 306 Polish Fighter Squadron
- No. 308 Polish Fighter Squadron
- No. 316 Polish Fighter Squadron
- No. 349 (Belgian) Squadron RAF - Arrived on 22 October 1943
- No. 350 (Belgian) Squadron RAF
- No. 411 Squadron RCAF
- No. 412 Squadron RCAF - Squadron Detachments with Spitfires there from November 1942 to January 1943, before the squadron arrived on 21 June 1943 with Spitfire Mk. Vb aircraft
- No. 501 (County of Gloucester) Squadron AAF
- No. 610 (County of Chester) Squadron AAF
- No. 666 Squadron RCAF - Its Auster aircraft appeared on 18 April 1945 and stayed a little over a month

Units

- No. 7 Fighter Command Servicing Unit - arrived in early 1945
- No. 2720 Squadron RAF Regiment
- No. 2727 Squadron RAF Regiment
- No. 2751 Squadron RAF Regiment
- No. 2762 Squadron RAF Regiment
- No. 2792 Squadron RAF Regiment
- No. 2793 Squadron RAF Regiment
- No. 2803 Squadron RAF Regiment
- No. 2807 Squadron RAF Regiment
- No. 2846 Squadron RAF Regiment
- No. 2851 Squadron RAF Regiment
- No. 4065 Anti-Aircraft Flight RAF Regiment
- Air Sea Rescue Flight RAF, Shoreham/Friston/Shoreham (1941) became 'C' Flight, No. 277 Squadron RAF
