= RAF Kingston Bagpuize =

Former RAF station in Oxfordshire, England

RAF Kingston Bagpuize
- Kingston Bagpuize, Oxfordshire in England
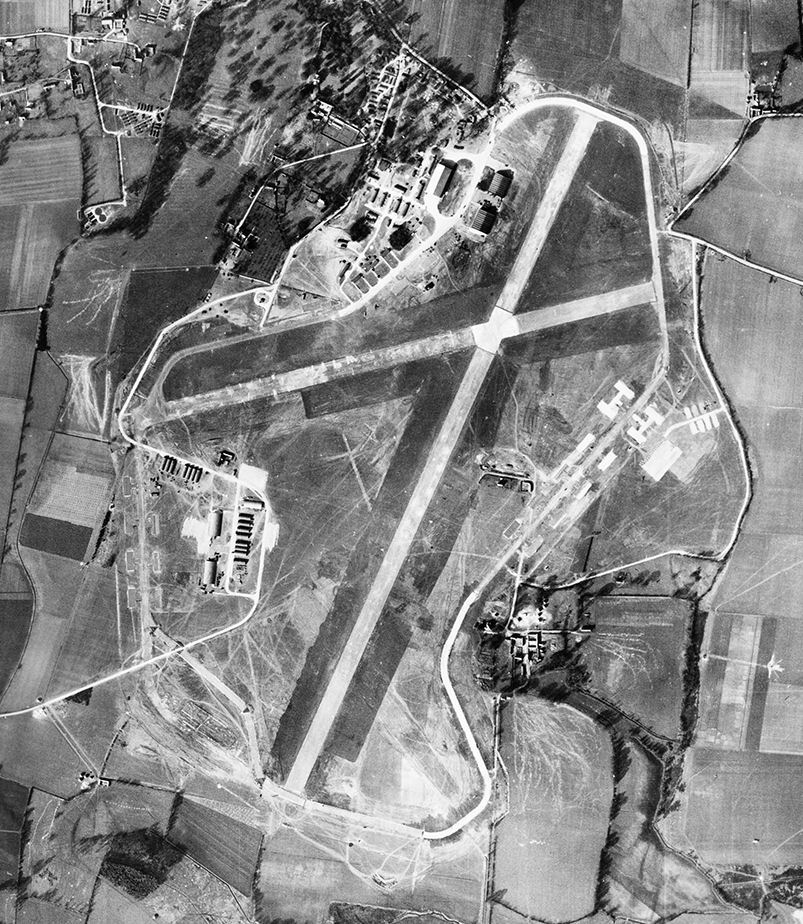
- RAF Kingston Bagpuize, 8 March 1944

Site information
- Type: Royal Air Force satellite station
- Code: KB
- Owner: Air Ministry
- Operator: Royal Air Force
- Controlled by: RAF Bomber Command

Location
- Shown within Oxfordshire RAF Kingston Bagpuize (the United Kingdom)
- Coordinates: 51°40′19″N 1°24′29″W

Site history
- Built: 1941/42
- In use: 1942 - 1954
- Battles/wars: European theatre of World War II

Airfield information
- Elevation: 91 metres (299 ft) AMSL
Runways
Direction	Length and surface
00/00	Sommerfeld Tracking
00/00	Sommerfeld Tracking

'Royal Air Force Kingston Bagpuize or more simply RAF Kingston Bagpuize is a former Royal Air Force satellite station located near to Kingston Bagpuize, Oxfordshire, England.

== History ==
RAF operations started in January 1942 as a Relief Landing Ground (RLG) with No. 3 Elementary Flying Training School RAF (EFTS) who left in May. Between January and April 1943, No. 4 Glider Training School (GTS) operated from here. In March 1943 No. 20 (Pilots) Advanced Flying Unit ((P) AFU) used the airfield as a satellite for the Airspeed Oxfords, but left in July.

The airfield was then closed while contractors enlarged it. The works were completed by January 1944 when the USAAF Ninth Air Force moved in. They used the airfield for maintenance work, mainly on Lockheed P-38 Lightning fighters and the photo-reconnaissance version, the F-5, and North American P-51 Mustang fighters. Their main use for the airfield appears to have been the testing of wire mesh as a runway surface, and some intensive testing was done from March to May, mainly with large numbers of Republic P-47 Thunderbolts and several Douglas C-47 Skytrain transports.

The testing was completed by August 1944 when the airfield was handed over to 3 MU who used it for storage. The site was permanently closed on 14 June 1954. Most of the land reverted to agriculture, but some buildings remain in agricultural and industrial use, and some other buildings, including the control tower, remain in a derelict condition.

== Units ==
The following units were here at some point:

- No. 3 Elementary Flying Training School RAF
- No. 3 Maintenance Unit RAF
- No. 4 Glider Training School RAF
- No. 20 (Pilots) Advanced Flying Unit RAF
- No. 2722 Squadron RAF Regiment
- No. 2786 Squadron RAF Regiment
- No. 2796 Squadron RAF Regiment
- No. 2799 Squadron RAF Regiment
