= RAF Hunmanby Moor =

Former Royal Air Force training camp in Yorkshire, England

- Hunmanby, Filey, East Riding of Yorkshire (Note: During the Second World War, Hunmanby, and a large part of the town of Filey, were in the East Riding of Yorkshire. The boundary changes to the Yorkshire counties in 1974, moved the site into North Yorkshire.) in England
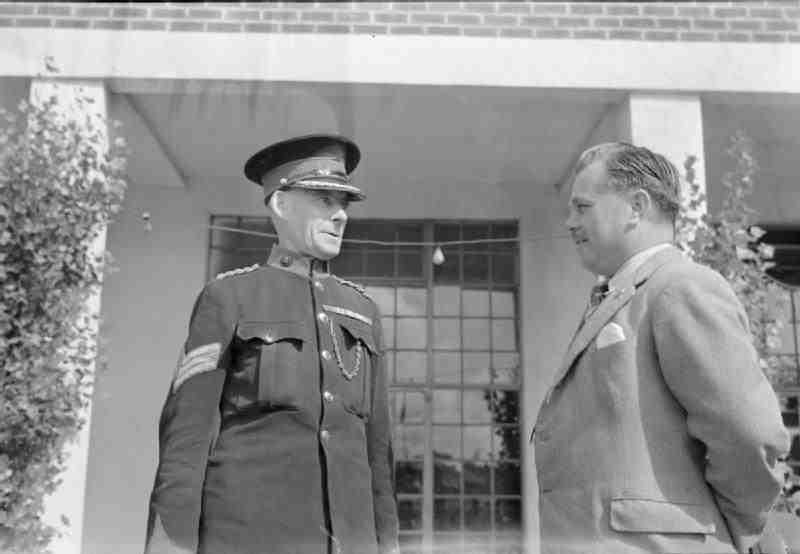
- Billy Butlin at Filey (RAF Hunmanby Moor) in 1945

Location
- Coordinates: 54.183°N 0.279°W

Site history
- Built: 1939
- In use: 1945

RAF Hunmanby Moor, (also known as RAF Filey), was a Royal Air Force training camp during the Second World War in Hunmanby, East Riding of Yorkshire, England. The site was commandeered at the outbreak of war and returned to civilian use as a holiday camp in 1945. From 1942, many RAF Regiment training courses were run at the site.

== History ==
The Butlin's holiday camp at Filey was requisitioned at the outbreak of the Second World War to act as a training camp for recruits. Although located near the village of Hunmanby, it was intended to be known as, and post-war was called, Butlin's Filey. On initial commencement of military activity, the site was called RAF Filey. In 1942, it became an RAF Regiment training depot, and during the next three years, until 1945, several RAF Regiment squadrons and training schools were allocated here. The RAF depot at Filey was the first of its type in the RAF, and so instructors from the Brigade of Guards and the Royal Marines were drafted in to help with training. The depot moved soon afterwards to RAF Belton Park in Lincolnshire, although Regiment training continued at Hunmanby Moor.

In 1944, The Times reported on the 2,000 men from the West Indies who had arrived at Hunmanby Moor for their 12-week basic training. A fictionalised account of West Indian recruits at RAF Hunmanby Moor features in Andrea Levy's book Small Island. A plaque to commemorate the Caribbean air crew who trained at the base, was unveiled in Filey, in April 2023. The BBC reporting that 4,000 men completed military exercises at the camp.

One of the last units to leave Hunmanby Moor was the RAF Regiment's LAA Gunnery School, which was posted to Nethertown in August 1945. Thereafter, the whole of the site was returned to the Butlin's company and civilian use.

== Based units ==
Unit	Dates	Notes	Ref
No. 1 RAF Regiment School	February 1942 – February 1944	Moved from RAF Melksham as No. 6 Recruit Training Wing	
No. 2 Wing Aircrew Officers School	8 February – 9 May 1944		
No. 3 RAF Regiment School	February 1943 – 1945		
No. 5 Anti-Aircraft Practice Camp			
No. 21 Air Crew Holding Unit	January – February 1944		
No. 2707 RAF Regiment Squadron	1 January 1945 – 6 February 1945	Arrived from Merston, moved to North Weald	
No. 2723 RAF Regiment Squadron	21 November 1944 – 30 December 1944	Arrived from West Malling, moved to Lympne	
No. 2749 RAF Regiment Squadron	15 February 1942 – 6 April 1942	Formed at Hunmanby Moor, posted to Wick	

== Notable personnel ==
- Michael Beetham, spent February 1943 at the base awaiting aircrew training
