= RAF Greencastle =

Former RAF station in Northern Ireland

RAF Greencastle USAAF Station 237
- Kilkeel, County Down in Northern Ireland
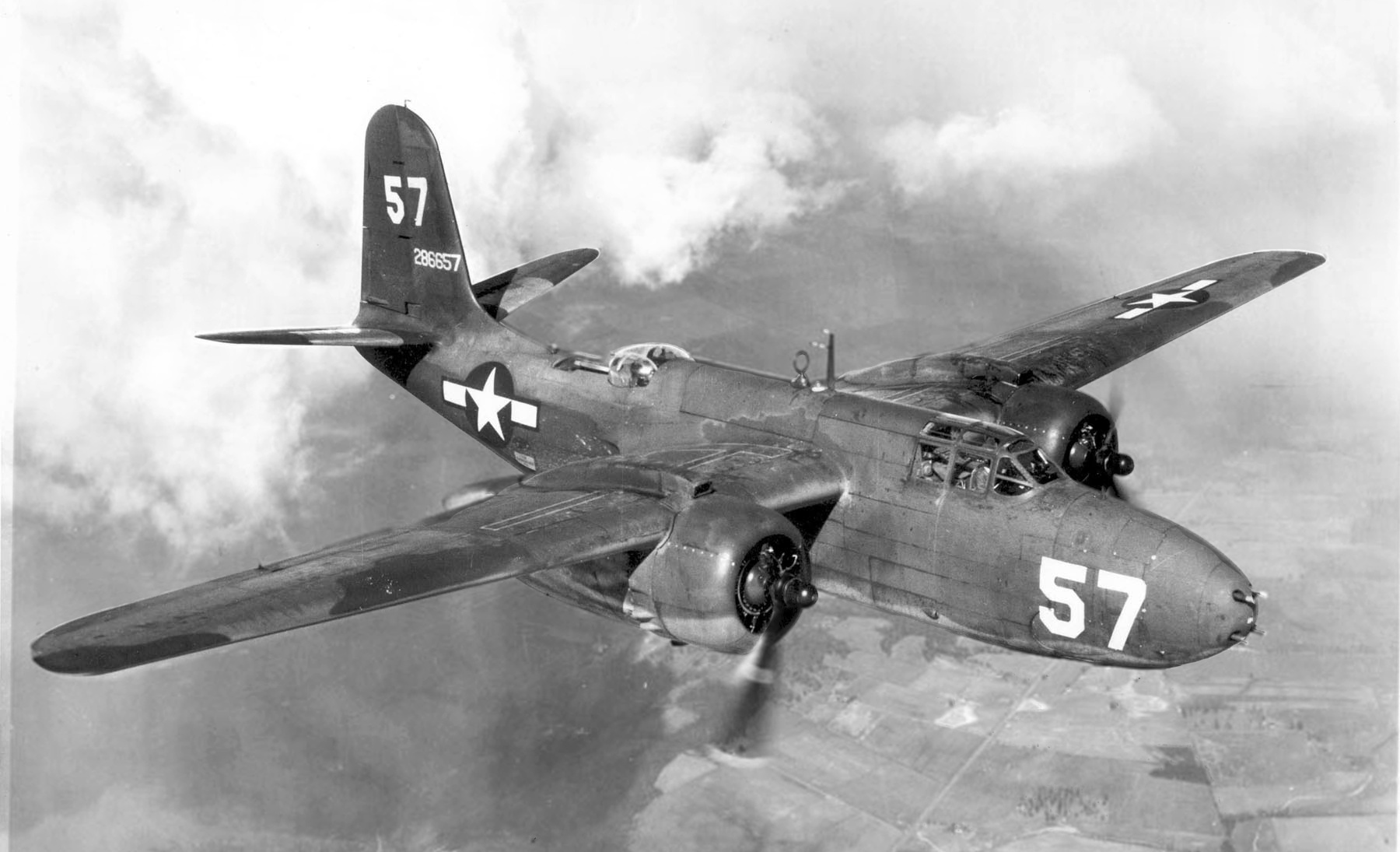
- A-20G of the USAAF of the type flown from RAF Greencastle.

Site information
- Owner: Air Ministry
- Operator: Royal Air Force; United States Army Air Forces

Location
- Shown within Northern Ireland RAF Greencastle (the United Kingdom)
- Coordinates: 54°02′01″N 006°03′38″W

Site history
- Built: 1941
- In use: 1942-1945
- Battles/wars: European theatre of World War II

Airfield information
- Elevation: 50 metres (164 ft) AMSL

Royal Air Force Greencastle or more simply RAF Greencastle is a former Royal Air Force airfield located 3 miles (4.8 km) south-west of the fishing village of Kilkeel and took in a large part of Cranfield Bay.

It opened as an RAF bomber Operational Training Unit (OTU) in April 1942 but was almost immediately transferred to the United States Army Air Forces (USAAF) and renamed AAF Stn 237.

== History ==
=== Construction ===
Construction of the airfield began on 12 January 1942. The consulting engineers were Landon-Every And Ferkin Ltd. and the main contractor was Messrs A.M. Carmichael (Scotland).

Some of the best agricultural land in the area was taken. Compensation, considered by some to be totally inadequate, was offered, but not always accepted. In some cases households were asked to vacate their homes almost overnight. Some families refused to move and the airfield was built around them, in the townlands of Derryoge, Dunnaval, Ballynahatten, Cranfield, and Grange.

Air Ministry Compulsory Acquisition orders gave the occupiers three days to move out, without any obligation on the Air Ministry to find them alternative accommodation. This short notice period applied only to houses that were sited where the runways were to be built. Other home owners had more time to remove roofs and anything else that was salvageable. Most of the farmers had their lands cultivated and ploughed ready for the planting of early potatoes, an important crop in this area of small (5-15 acres) family farms. Sheds were full of boxes of sprouted Arran Pilots ready to be planted.

Around 450 buildings of various shapes and sizes were erected, at a safe distance from the ammunition and bomb stores, and runways. A number of building foundations were excavated and concreted but never built on; other buildings were only partly erected. Several new buildings were never used during the war years. Approximately 5 miles of water mains were was laid from the Silent Valley reservoir. Ownership of this pipeline was transferred to the local authority when the station closed.

=== Operations ===
The station was a satellite of RAF Langford Lodge (AAF Stn 597) and was established to handle the overflow from the extremely busy parent station.

From 1944 until the end of the war, salvage, refurbishment and repair of both 8th and 9th AF was carried out at both stations, as was the training of bomber crews. Air gunners were trained at RAF Greencastle by the USAAF where the 4th Gunnery & Tow Target Flight were located with Douglas A-20 Havocs, Westland Lysanders and Vultee Vengeance A-35B's in the Consolidated B-24 Liberator gunnery school.

May until August 1944 was classed as the busiest period of WW2; during July 1944, 330 heavy bomber crews graduated from Greencastle and Cluntoe.

The following RAF units were based at RAF Greencastle at various times:

- No. 2708 Squadron RAF Regiment
- No. 2754 Squadron RAF Regiment
- No. 2755 Squadron RAF Regiment
- No. 2756 Squadron RAF Regiment
- No. 2775 Squadron RAF Regiment

== Key Operational Dates ==
- April 1942, built as an RAF bomber OTU but transferred to USAAF.
- May 1942, No. 2852 Sqn RAF formed.
- 30 July 1942, opened but USAAF did not take over until 3 August 1943.
- Between 1943 and February 1944, 5th Combat Crew Replacement Centre ground to air firing practice for B-24 Liberator bomber crews, later moved to RAF Cheddington.
- July 1944, 5th Replacement & Training Squadron (Bombardment) established at Greencastle.
- During 1944 it was a satellite air depot to RAF Langford Lodge with Boeing B-17 Flying Fortresses and B-24s.
- From 3 December 1943 until September 1944 it was used by the 4th Gunnery and Tow Target Flight with Havocs, Lysanders and Vengeance A-35B's in the B-24 gunnery school, later moved to RAF Chipping Ongar.
- February 1945 until May 1945 the 5th Airdrome Squadron was in control of air depot.
- On 31 May 1945 it was returned to RAF control.

=== Visit by Eisenhower ===
On 17 May 1944 General Dwight D. Eisenhower flew into the station for an inspection. He was met by General Stafford LeRoy Irwin and viewed the 5th Infantry Division and Divisional artillery, which were drawn up on the airfield.

== Current use ==
The airfield was returned to RAF control in 1945 and almost immediately closed. In the 1960s the runways were broken up and the concrete was used to construct boundary walls by the land owners.

Many of the buildings still exist but are in a derelict condition. The basic layout of the station can still be seen from the air but the signature of the runways is gone. A caravan site occupies much of the southernmost portion.

Cranfield Loyal Orange Lodge 907 recently unfurled a new banner with a memorial to the American Army in the Cranfield and Greencastle area.

== See also ==
- List of former Royal Air Force stations
