= RAF Swingate Down =

Former RAF station in Kent, England

RAF Swingate Down
- Near Dover, Kent in England

Site information
- Type: RAF Radar station
- Owner: Air Ministry
- Operator: Royal Air Force

Location
- Shown within Kent RAF Swingate Down (the United Kingdom)
- Coordinates: 51°08′22″N 1°20′30″E

Site history
- Built: 1913; 1938
- In use: 1913-1920; 1938-1945

Royal Air Force Swingate Down or more simply RAF Swingate Down is a former Royal Air Force Chain Home Low radar station operational during the Second World War located north of Dover, Kent, England.

The site was situated on alongside RAF Dover, another Radar section together on the removed First World War landing ground of RAF Dover.

== History ==
=== First World War ===
Swingate Aerodrome was first established in 1910 by Charles Rolls (of Rolls-Royce). With the increasing possibility of war, the site was further developed as a military airfield, becoming Dover (St. Margaret's) Aerodrome in July 1913, although still also known as 'Swingate'. At the outbreak of war in August 1914, all four squadrons of the RFC were posted to Swingate, and on 8 August 1914, the entire strength, a total of 56 aircraft, set out to cross the English Channel, bound for Amiens in France.

For the duration of the war, Swingate served as a training centre, and as a stopping-off point for aircraft before flying over the English Channel to France. The following units used Swingate in one way or another:

- No. 2 Squadron RFC
- No. 3 Squadron RFC
- No. 4 Squadron RFC
- No. 5 Squadron RFC
- No. 7 Squadron RFC
- No. 9 Squadron RFC
- No. 12 Reserve Aeroplane Squadron RFC
- No. 13 Reserve Aeroplane Squadron RFC
- No. 15 Squadron RFC
- No. 20 Reserve Squadron RFC
- No. 27 Squadron RFC
- No. 49 Squadron RFC
- No. 50 Squadron RFC
- No. 58 Squadron RFC
- No. 62 Training Squadron RFC
- No. 64 Reserve Squadron RFC
- No. 65 Training Squadron RFC
- No. 110 Squadron RFC
- No. 212 Squadron RFC
- 141st Aero Squadron (Pursuit), Air Service, United States Army
- Machine Gun School (Note: Became the School of Aerial Gunnery in September 1916 at RFC Hythe, Kent)

=== Second World War ===
RAF Dover was re-established as a Chain Home radar station during 1938.

RAF Swingate Down was located to the east of RAF Dover but within the confines of the old landing ground as Chain Home Low radar station.

== Current use ==
The site is a transmitting station.
