= RAF Great Sampford =

Former RAF station in Essex, England

RAF Great Sampford USAAF Station AAF-359
- Near Great Sampford, Essex in England
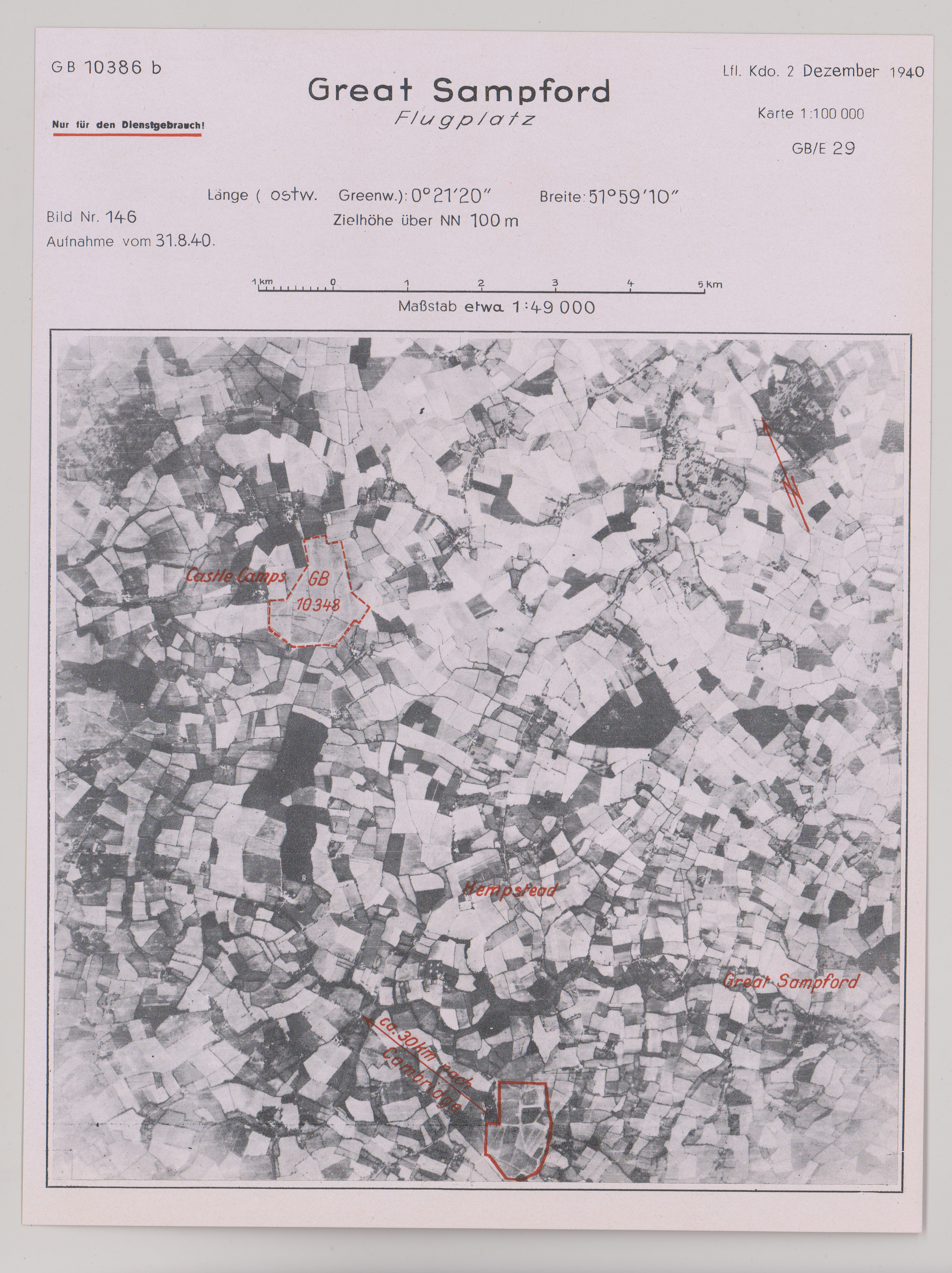
- RAF Great Sampford on a target dossier of the German Luftwaffe, 1940

Site information
- Type: Royal Air Force satellite station
- Code: GS
- Owner: Air Ministry
- Operator: Royal Air Force; United States Army Air Forces
- Controlled by: RAF Fighter Command * No. 11 Group RAF

Location
- Shown within Essex RAF Great Sampford (the United Kingdom)
- Coordinates: 51°59′26″N 000°21′24″E

Site history
- Built: 1941/42
- In use: April 1942 – August 1944
- Battles/wars: European theatre of World War II

Airfield information
- Elevation: 104 metres (341 ft) AMSL
Runways
| Direction | Length and surface |
|---|---|
| 00/00 | Sommerfeld Tracking |
| 00/00 | Sommerfeld Tracking |

Royal Air Force Great Sampford or more simply RAF Great Sampford is a former Royal Air Force satellite station located 1.7 miles (2.7 km) west of Great Sampford, Essex, England and 5.3 miles (8.5 km) south east of Saffron Walden, Essex.

== History ==
No. 65 (East India) Squadron RAF used the airfield starting on 14 March 1942 flying Supermarine Spitfire V's before leaving to RAF Martlesham Heath on 9 June 1942 before returning again on 15 June 1942 for fifteen days. The squadron left again and returned on 7 July 1942 staying until 29 July 1942 when the squadron moved RAF Gravesend.

The following units were here at some point:

- 4th Fighter Group
- No. 133 Squadron RAF (1942)
- No. 616 Squadron RAF (1942)
- No. 50 'B' Balloon Flight
- No. 53 'B' Balloon Flight
- No. 945/947 (Balloon) Squadron
- No. 951 (Balloon) Squadron
- No. 976 (Balloon) Squadron
- No. 991 (Balloon) Squadron
- No. 992 (Balloon) Squadron
- No. 996 (Balloon) Squadron
- No. 997 (Balloon) Squadron
- No. 999 (Balloon) Squadron
- No. 2713 Squadron RAF Regiment
- No. 2719 Squadron RAF Regiment
- No. 2724 Squadron RAF Regiment
- No. 2739 Squadron RAF Regiment
- No. 2757 Squadron RAF Regiment
- No. 2777 Squadron RAF Regiment
- No. 2778 Squadron RAF Regiment
- No. 2781 Squadron RAF Regiment
- No. 2798 Squadron RAF Regiment
- No. 2806 Squadron RAF Regiment
- No. 2811 Squadron RAF Regiment
- No. 2849 Squadron RAF Regiment
