= No. 2909 Squadron RAF Regiment =

The 2909 Squadron of the RAF Regiment saw action in Greece taking part in an invasion of the island of Kos from 15 September 1943 during the first time the RAF Regiment units deployed for action by air. The squadron deployed together with the 2901 Squadron, both armed with 33 Hispano-Suiza HS.404 anti-aircraft guns in support of the 1 battalion Durham Light Infantry.

== See also ==
- Military history of Greece during World War II
