= Great Sampford =

Village in Essex, England

Coordinates: 51.992°N 0.391°E

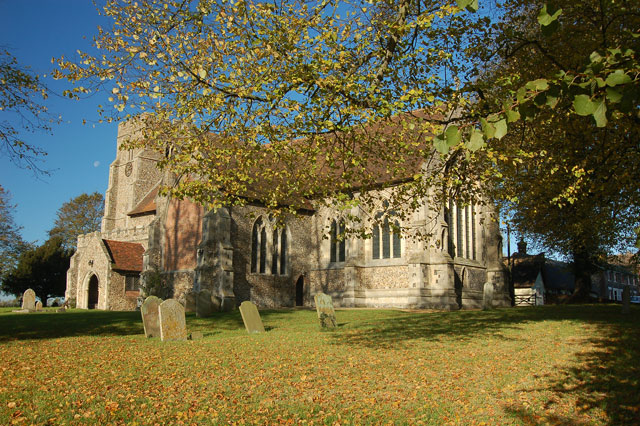
- Great Sampford Church

- Location within Essex
- Population: 579 (Parish, 2021)
- Civil parish: Great Sampford
- District: Uttlesford
- Shire county: Essex
- Region: East
- Country: England
- Sovereign state: United Kingdom
- Post town: SAFFRON WALDEN
- Postcode district: CB10

Great Sampford is a village and civil parish in the Uttlesford district of Essex, England. The village is at the junction of the B1053 and B1051 roads. The village includes a primary school, two places of worship and one public house. It is located 3 miles (5 km) northeast of the small town of Thaxted, and 8 miles (13 km) southeast of Saffron Walden, its post town. At the 2021 census the parish had a population of 579.

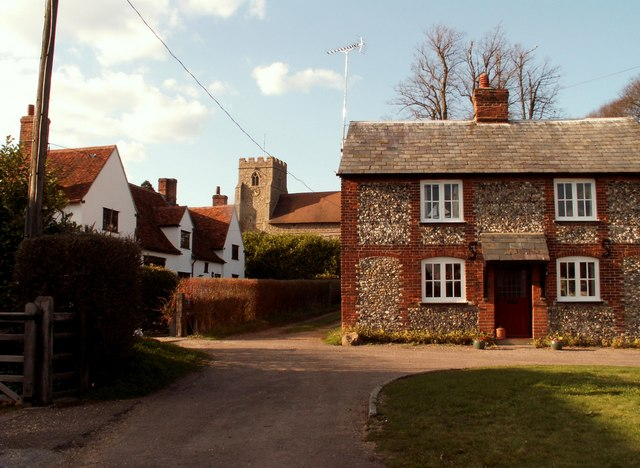
St Michael's Church from the Thaxted end of the village.

It used to have an RAF airfield called RAF Great Sampford. The River Pant runs through the south of the village. It is connected to Hempstead by Howe Lane.

The village contains two churches - the Baptist Church, which also owns a small hall adjacent to the property, used by the community for the pre-school; and also a Church of England parish church, St Michael's.

Also in the village is a green and cricket club. Next to the green is a playground which includes a skatepark, donated by the National Lottery Fund, a zip wire funded by an Uttlesford District Council Community Grant, a small football pitch and a tennis court.

== Governance ==
Great Sampford is part of the electoral ward called The Sampfords. The population of this ward at the 2011 Census was 1,900.

== See also ==
- Little Sampford
- The Hundred Parishes
