= Little Sampford =

Village and civil parish in Essex, England

Coordinates: 51.979°N 0.408°E

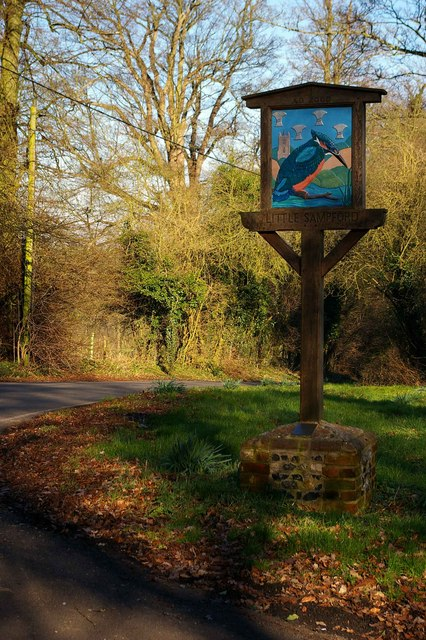
- Village sign

- Location within Essex
- Population: 269 (Parish, 2021)
- Civil parish: Little Sampford
- District: Uttlesford
- Shire county: Essex
- Region: East
- Country: England
- Sovereign state: United Kingdom
- Post town: SAFFRON WALDEN
- Postcode district: CB10
- Police: Essex
- Fire: Essex
- Ambulance: East of England

Little Sampford is a village and civil parish in the Uttlesford district of Essex, England. It lies on the B1053 road, 7 miles (11 km) south-east of Saffron Walden, its post town. At the 2021 census the parish had a population of 269.

The parish was historically sometimes known as Sampford Parva.

== See also ==
- Great Sampford
- The Hundred Parishes
