= RAF Belton Park =

Former RAF station in Lincolnshire, England

RAF Belton Park
- Located near Grantham, Lincolnshire, England
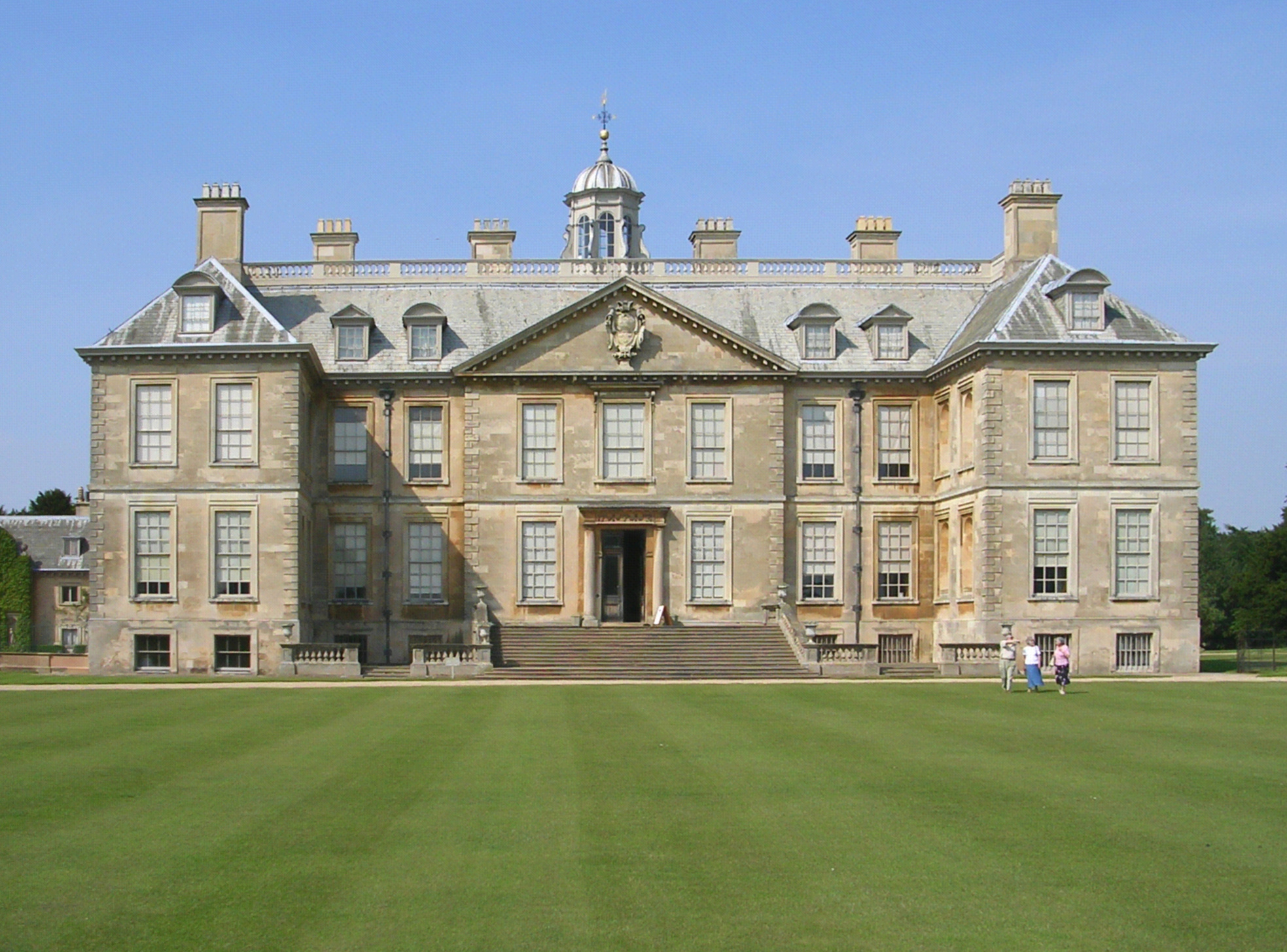
- Belton House

Site information
- Type: Disestablished Military Training Depot (Non flying station)
- Owner: Air Ministry
- Controlled by: Royal Air Force
- Condition: Some buildings remaining, most converted to temporary housing then demolished and replaced by industrial buildings

Location
- Coordinates: 52°55′30.4″N 0°36′16.9″W

Site history
- Built: 1942
- In use: 1942 - 1946
- Materials: Brick buildings with some Nissen huts
- Battles/wars: Second World War

Garrison information
- Garrison: Royal Air Force Regiment Training Depot

RAF Belton Park was established in 1942 as the Royal Air Force Regiment Depot, for training RAF Regiment personnel in airfield defence. Belton Park is located 2 miles (3.2 km) north of the centre of Grantham, Lincolnshire, England. The site of the Depot was on farmland on the opposite side of Londonthorpe Lane from the Park.

== History ==
As early as the 1920s the RAF had formed small airfield defence units but traditionally the role of ground defence had predominantly been handled by detachments of regular army personnel. In the Second World War it became evident in the aftermath of the Dunkirk evacuation that the army did not have the resources, personnel or expertise to continue supporting the growing number of UK and overseas RAF airfields and the decision was taken to form a dedicated RAF defence force.

In January 1942 King George VI signed a Royal Warrant for "a Corps formed as an integral part of the RAF", and the RAF Regiment was born.

The first Depot was opened in RAF Hunmanby Moor with instructional staff seconded from the Brigade of Guards and the Royal Marines. The Depot moved to Belton Park in 1942.

During the First World War Belton Park had been a training centre for the Machine Gun Corps and had housed and trained 18,000 men. During 1914 and 1915, a railway connection was built between the East Coast Main Line and Belton Park; known as the Belton Park Military Railway, it closed in 1921, two years after training at Belton Park had ceased. During the First World War the hundreds of temporary wooden huts had been built over the Belton Park Golf Course's fairways and a highly detailed map of the site remains on display in the current golf course clubhouse.

RAF Belton Park closed in 1946 and the headquarters and depot of the RAF Regiment were combined and relocated to RAF Catterick where they remained until 1994 when they relocated to its current home at RAF Honington.

== Belton Park today ==
In 1946 the site was converted into temporary housing, and named Alma Park Estate. The former NAAFI block was converted into a primary school.

The houses and school have been demolished, and the site is now an industrial estate.

== See also ==
- List of former Royal Air Force stations
- RAF Regiment
- Belton House
