= Brunton, Northumberland =

Village in Northumberland, England

Coordinates: 55.514°N 1.677°W

Brunton
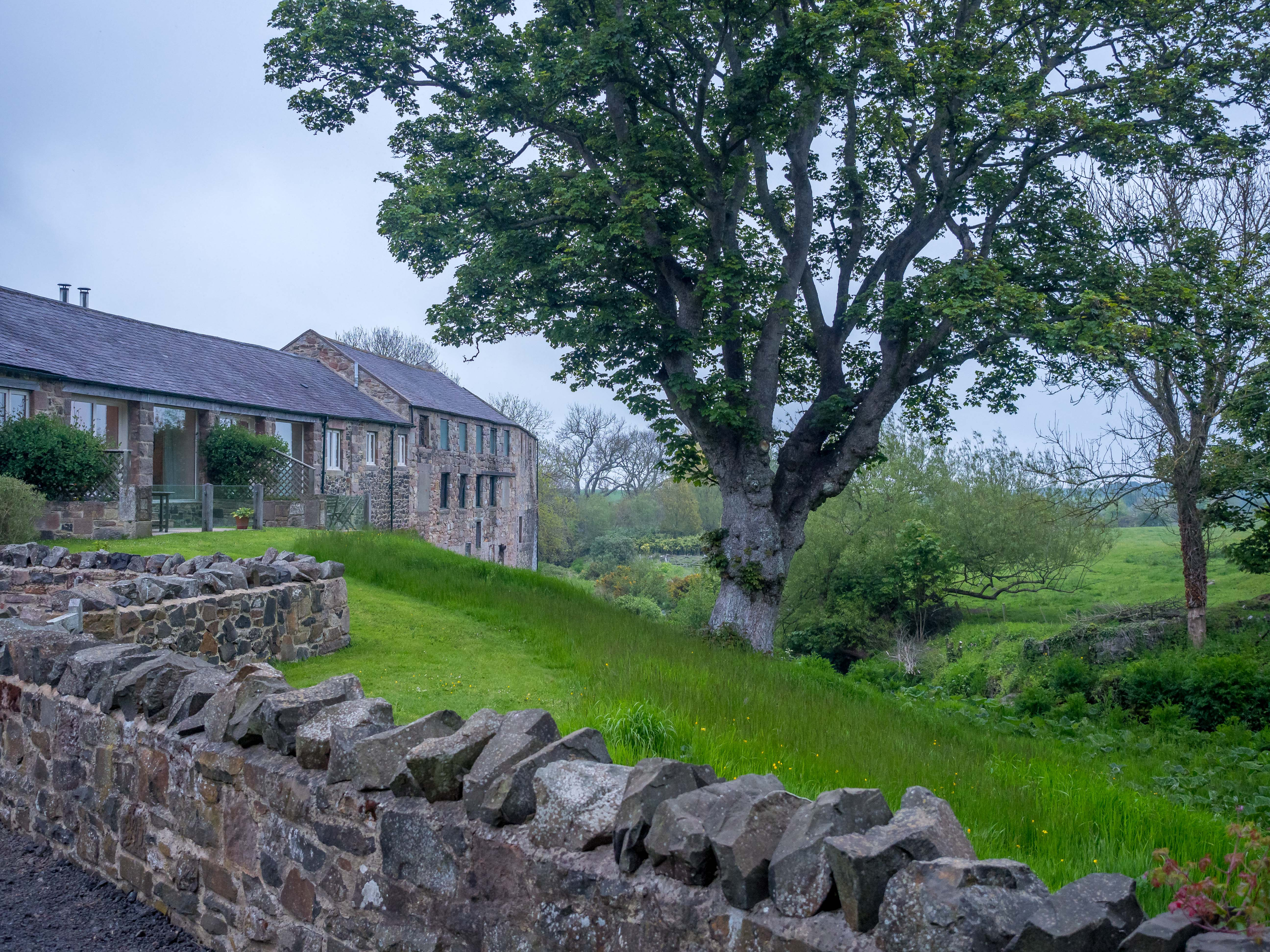

- Location within Northumberland
- OS grid reference: NU205245
- Civil parish: Newton-by-the-Sea
- Unitary authority: Northumberland
- Shire county: Northumberland
- Region: North East
- Country: England
- Sovereign state: United Kingdom
- Post town: ALNWICK
- Postcode district: NE66
- Police: Northumbria
- Fire: Northumberland
- Ambulance: North East
- UK Parliament: North Northumberland

Brunton is a village and former civil parish, now in the parish of Newton-by-the-Sea, in the county of Northumberland, England. It is about 7 miles (11 km) north of Alnwick, a short distance inland from the North Sea. In 1951 the parish had a population of 35.

== History ==
The village is in open flat terrain and gave its name to RAF Brunton, an airfield built during World War II, whose abandoned concrete runways lie immediately north of the village. RAF Brunton was operational as a satellite training airfield for RAF Milfield from the summer of 1942 until early 1946 and existed as a civil aviation field till 2003.

== Governance ==
Brunton is in the Northumberland County Council division of Longhoughton, and the parliamentary constituency of Berwick-upon-Tweed. In 1866 Brunton became a civil parish in its own right; it was abolished on 1 April 1955 and merged with Newton by the Sea.

== Landmarks ==
The village has a country house and a mill with ancillary buildings. All are now holiday lets.
