= Folake Solanke =

Nigerian lawyer

Chief Folake Solanke SAN, CON,
- Born: Olufolake Odulate; 29 March 1932 (age 94); Abeokuta, Ogun State, Nigeria
- Education: Newcastle University
- Occupation: Lawyer
- Years active: 1949–present
- Spouse: Toriola Solanke
- Children: Dr (Mrs) Oluyemi Koya; Miss Olushola Solanke; Engr. B.A Solanke
- Parent(s): Jacob Odulate (father) and Sekumade Abiodun Odulate (mother)
- Awards: SAN, CON, LLD, LLB

Chief Folake Solanke (born 29 March 1932), SAN, CON, is a Nigerian lawyer, administrator and social critic. She is the first female Senior Advocate of Nigeria and the first Nigerian female lawyer to wear the silk gown as Senior Counsel. She is the first Commissioner of Western State and is a former Chairperson of the Western Nigeria Television Broadcasting Corporation (WNTBC).

She was the 42nd and the first African International President of Zonta International, an international service organization that focus primarily on advancing the status of women. The 43rd International President was also African.

== Early life ==
Folake Solanke was born on 29 March 1932 in the family of late Pa. J.S Odulate at Abeokuta, the capital of Ogun State in southwestern Nigeria.

From 1937 to 1939, Solanke attended Ago Oko primary school. From 1940 to 1944, she attended Emo Girls School in Abeokuta. From 1945 to 1949, she attended Methodist Girls' High School Lagos, where she took first prize in English and Mathematics consistently. In 1949, Solanke obtained the West African School Certificate, became School Prefect and Games Captain, and at the West Africa School Certificate Examinations she became the first student of the school to obtain grade one certificate. She spent a year at Queen's College, Lagos before she proceeded to Newcastle University (then University of Durham), England, where she obtained a Bachelor of Arts (2nd Division) degree in Latin and Mathematics in 1954. In 1955, Solanke received a diploma certificate in education (2nd Division) and joined the faculty of Pipers Corner School, Great Kingshill, High Wycombe, Buckinghamshire, where she taught Latin and mathematics for 2 years. In October 1956, she married Toriola Solanke. In 1957, she joined the faculty of St Monica's High School, Essex, where she taught the same subjects for one year.

In 1960, Solanke was admitted into Gray's Inn, London, to read for a degree in law. In 1962, she returned to Nigeria to practise law.

== Law career ==
Upon her return to Nigeria in August 1962, Solanke began her law career at the chamber of late Honorable Justice Michael Adeyinka Odesanya (rtd), while teaching Latin and Mathematics at Yejide Girls Grammar School in Ibadan, Oyo. Her father died in April 1963. In May 1963, after she was called to the Bar in absentia, she moved to the law office of Chief Frederick Rotimi Williams as junior counsel.

In 1972, Solanke was appointed the first Commissioner of Western State and chairperson of the Western Nigeria Television Broadcasting Corporation (WNTBC).

In 1981, Solanke became the first female Senior Advocate of Nigeria and the first Nigerian female lawyer to wear the silk gown.

Solanke rose through the ranks of Zonta International, first serving as the District Governor for Africa and then as International Vice-President. In 1988, 1990, and 1994, Solanke ran for election to the International Presidency of the organization (she did not run in 1992). She lost the first two times, but won the third time, being elected in Hong Kong on 21 July 1994 as the 42nd International President, the first non–caucasian, African president of the organization since its establishment in 1919.

Solanke's autobiography, Reaching for the stars was published in 2007. The book described her as a "Lady of many firsts" and how she rose to prominence in the legal profession.

== Awards ==
Chief Solanke has received numerous awards, including the National honour of the Commander of the Order of Niger.

In 1981, Solanke was conferred with a traditional title as the Yeyemofin of Ife by the late Olubuse II, the 50th Ooni of Ife, following her conferment with the rank of Senior Advocate of Nigeria.

In 2012, Solanke received the International Bar Association's Outstanding International Woman Lawyer Award at the Association's 5th World Women Lawyers’ Conference held in London, in recognition of her professional excellence and immense contribution to the advancement of women within the legal profession. Also in 2012, Solanke released her second book, A Compendium of Selected Lectures and Papers, Volume 1.

On 17 January 2015 Solanke was honoured with a Lifetime Achievement Award by The Sun Newspaper at a ceremony held at Eko Hotels and Suites, Victoria Island, Lagos.

== See also ==
- First women lawyers around the world
