= Structure of the Royal Air Force =

This is the structure of the Royal Air Force (RAF).

Air Chief Marshal Harv Smyth serves as the Chief of the Air Staff, the professional head of the Royal Air Force, alongside Air Marshal Paul Lloyd, the Deputy Chief of the Air Staff. Warrant Officer Murugesvaran Subramaniam was appointed the senior Warrant Officer of the RAF in April 2023. Air Marshal Allan Marshall was appointed Air and Space Commander in March 2024.

== Air and Space Commander ==
Air Command was formed as a merger of Strike Command, and Personnel and Training Command to administer the majority of operational units within the RAF. Its last commander stepped down in 2012. The air marshal supervising operations now carries the title Air and Space Commander and reports directly to the Chief of the Air Staff. The Air and Space Commander is located at RAF High Wycombe, Buckinghamshire.

Also at High Wycombe are the RAF Safety Centre. No. 7644 (VR) Public Relations Squadron RAuxAF is at RAF Halton.

== No. 1 Group ==
No 1. Group has responsibility for the vast majority of the RAF's frontline units. It comprises the following elements.

=== Air and Space Warfare Centre ===
The Air and Space Warfare Centre is based at RAF Waddington and provides advice to support current and future RAF operations, including in relation to electronic-warfare, cyber and information environments.

=== Air Mobility Force ===
The Air Mobility Force is based at RAF Brize Norton and provides the RAF's airlift capability in support of overseas operations and exercises, as well as air-to-air refuelling for fast jets, both on operations and in support of UK homeland defence. Its fleet comprises the Voyager KC2/KC3 for strategic air transport and air-to-air refuelling; the C-17 Globemaster III for strategic airlift; the A400M Atlas for tactical airlift; and the Envoy IV CC1 in the Command Support Air Transport role.

=== Combat Air Force ===
The Combat Air Force operates the Eurofighter Typhoon FGR4 and Lockheed Martin F-35 Lightning II. It generates, operates and sustains combat air power in all tasked roles and environments to defend the UK and its interests globally. It also defends UK sovereign airspace 24 hours a day, 7 days a week and 365 days a year.

It also oversees the Display Air Wing which includes the Battle of Britain Memorial Flight which operates several historic aircraft types and the RAF Aerobatic Team (The Red Arrows) flying the BAE Hawk T1A.

=== ISTAR Force ===
The Intelligence, Surveillance, Target Acquisition, and Reconnaissance (ISTAR) Force delivers near-real time information and intelligence in air and maritime domains. The ISTAR Force fleet comprises the Protector RG1 unmanned aerial vehicle; RC-135W Rivet Joint and Shadow R1 based at RAF Waddington and the Poseidon MRA1 maritime patrol aircraft based at RAF Lossiemouth. Operations are supported by the No. 1 Intelligence Surveillance and Reconnaissance Wing.

== No. 2 Group ==
No. 2 Group comprises the support functions of the Royal Air Force and includes the following elements and units.

=== Air bases ===
No. 2 Group manages the Air Base Wings at each of the RAF stations which provide the support structures and services required to operate them. Aircraft squadrons are controlled by separate Air Wings at each station.

=== Global Enablement ===
The Global Enablement element of No. 2 Group comprises six elements which support RAF operations:

==== No. 90 Signals Unit ====
No. 90 Signals Unit is based at RAF Leeming and provide communications support to the RAF. Its primary elements are the Tactical Communications Wing and the Operational Information Services Wing.

==== Air Command and Control Force ====
The Air Command and Control (C2) Force conducts continuous oversight and control of UK air space. The UK Air Surveillance And Control System is based at RAF Boulmer, with seven remote radar heads located around the UK. A squadron is embedded at NATS Swanwick, one of two air traffic control centres in the UK.

==== Air Security Force ====
The Air Security Force comprises the RAF Police, Military Provost Guard Service and civilians who provide policing and security to the RAF. Its headquarters is based at RAF Honington and it comprises three Police & Security Wings and the Specialist Investigations Branch.

==== Combat Readiness Force ====
The Combat Readiness Force is primarily formed by RAF Regiment personnel and is responsible for providing protection to the RAF's personnel, assets and operating environments. Its headquarters is located at RAF Honington and it comprises five force protection wings, the RAF Force Protection Centre and the RAF Regiment Training Wing.

==== Medical Force ====
The RAF Medical Force provides an aeromedical evacuation capability, undertakes medical planning and prepares regular and reserve RAF Medical Services personnel and capabilities for deployment. Its headquarters is located at RAF High Wycombe and comprises the Tactical Medical Wing, Medical Reserves Wing, and the RAF Centre of Aviation Medicine.

==== Support Force ====
The Support Force provides deployable logistics, engineering and enabling capabilities required to conduct operations and exercises. It is responsible for expeditionary engineering and logistics, supporting reserve capabilities, RAF Music Services and the RAF Mountain Rescue Service. The Support Force's primary components are No. 1 Air Mobility Wing, No. 42 (Expeditionary Support) Wing, No. 85 (Expeditionary Logistics) Wing, RAF Music Services, and the Reserves Logistics Support Wing

== No. 11 Group ==
No. 11 Group commands and controls air operations worldwide. It provides air defence of the UK through the National Air & Space Operations Centre; the ability to deploy with other services and nations with the Joint Force Air Component and oversees operations in the Middle East. Its headquarters are based at RAF High Wycombe and comprises the following primary elements:

- No. 83 Expeditionary Air Group
- Intelligence Reserves Wing
- Joint Air Liaison Organisation
- Joint Force Air Component
- National Air & Space Operations Centre

== No. 22 Group ==
No. 22 Group's role is to provide trained and educated personnel, RAF sport and the cadet force experience to support the RAF and wider defence requirements. Its headquarters are based at RAF High Wycombe.

=== Directorate of Ground Training ===
The Directorate of Ground Training provides training and education policy, governance, assurance and support.

=== Directorate of Flying Training ===
The Directorate of Flying Training delivers provides trained military aircrew, air traffic controllers and flight operations personnel to meet front line requirements. Flying trying is provided by Ascent Flight Training though the UK Military Flying Training System. It comprises the following units:

- No.1 Flying Training School – basic and advanced helicopter training, operating the Airbus Juno HT1 and Airbus Jupiter HT1
- No. 3 Flying Training School – elementary flying training and multi-engine pilot training, operating the Grob Tutor T1, Grob Prefect T1 and Embraer Phenom T1
- No. 4 Flying Training School – basic fast jet training and advanced fast jet training operating the Beechcraft Texan T1 and BAE Systems Hawk T2
- Defence College of Air and Space Operations – air traffic control and battlespace management training

=== Directorate of RAF Sport ===
The Directorate of RAF Sport is based at RAF Halton and together with RAF sports associations supports the provision of sport to RAF personnel at an individual, unit, service and inter-service levels.

=== Defence College of Technical Training ===
The Defence College of Technical Training has its headquarters at MOD Lyneham and provides technical training and education to around 20,000 members of the RAF, Royal Navy and British Army per annum. Training is delivered through three defence schools focussed upon aeronautical engineering, electronic and mechanical engineering, marine engineering, and communications and information systems engineering. It comprises:

- Defence School of Aeronautical Engineering
- Defence School of Communications and Information Systems
- Defence School of Electronic and Mechanical Engineering

=== Royal Air Force Air Cadets ===
The RAF Air Cadets is a youth organisation and the world's largest youth air training organisation, supported by thousands of volunteer staff. It comprises the Air Training Corps, RAF section of the Combined Cadet Force and No. 2 Flying Training School which oversees the RAF's Volunteer Gliding Squadrons which fly the Grob Viking T1.

=== Royal Air Force College ===
The RAF College Cranwell, based at RAF Cranwell, provides recruit and officer training, and oversees University Air Squadrons and Air Experience Flights through No. 6 Flying Training School.

== United Kingdom Space Command ==
United Kingdom Space Command is the joint command for space operations, staffed by personnel from the RAF, Royal Navy, British Army, civilians and contractors. Its mission is to protect and defend UK and allied interests in, from, and to space. Its headquarters is at RAF High Wycombe. The National Space Operations Centre, also at High Wycombe, is operated in jointly with the UK Space Agency and Met Office. It comprises the following elements:

- 1 Space Operations Squadron forms the military element of the National Space Operations Centre (MOD, Space Agency, and Meteorological Office) at RAF High Wycombe.
- 2 Space Warning Squadron operates the Solid State Phased Array Radar System at RAF Fylingdales.
- The UK Space Academy is located at the Defence Academy, Shrivenham, Oxfordshire.
