= Norah Smallwood =

British publisher (1909–1984)

Norah Smallwood OBE
- Born: Norah Evelyn Walford; 30 December 1909; Little Kingshill, Great Missenden, Buckinghamshire
- Died: 11 October 1984 (aged 74); Westminster Hospital, London, England
- Occupation: Publisher

Norah Evelyn Smallwood OBE (née Walford; 30 December 1909 – 11 October 1984) was an English publisher.

== Early life ==
Smallwood was born in Little Kingshill, Great Missenden, Buckinghamshire. She was the fifth of eight children of the artist Howard Neville Walford and his wife, Marion, née Griffiths. She was educated in Eastbourne.

== Career ==
She joined Chatto & Windus as a secretary in 1936, working with Ian Parsons and Harold Raymond. She married Peter W. S. Smallwood (1912–1943) in 1938. He was a chartered accountant, but was killed in action while serving as a navigator with the Royal Air Force. One of her brothers was also killed in action in the Second World War.

She continued to work at Chatto & Windus during the war, and became a partner in 1945. In 1947, she joined the board of the Hogarth Press, which had been bought by Chatto & Windus in 1946, and worked closely with its founder, Leonard Woolf, and with Cecil Day-Lewis. Among the authors under her care were Laurens van der Post, Laurie Lee, Aldous Huxley, Iris Murdoch, A. S. Byatt, Toni Morrison, Compton Mackenzie, William Sansom and Dirk Bogarde.

== Golden years in publishing ==
Smallwood was appointed to the board of Chatto & Windus when it became a limited company in 1953, and succeeded Ian Parsons as chairman and managing director in 1975. At some point, she and Parsons were said to have had an affair. She was also a member of the board of the company that owned Jonathan Cape from 1969, The Bodley Head from 1973 and Virago Press from 1982 (taken over by Random House in 1987). These 'golden years' of publishing, before the takeovers by conglomerates, were male dominated in terms of decision makers, and she was one of very few women – but a formidable one – to hold power in a book publishing company. She retired in 1982, succeeded at Chatto & Windus by Carmen Callil.

== Honours ==
She was appointed an Officer of the Order of the British Empire (OBE) in 1973, and received an honorary doctorate of literature (Litt.D.) from Leeds University in 1981.

== Death and legacy ==
She died at Westminster Hospital, London. Her correspondence and items relating to her career are held at the University of Leeds.
