= Jamie Thompson (RAF officer) =

Royal Air Force officer

Air Vice Marshal Jamie Thompson CBE
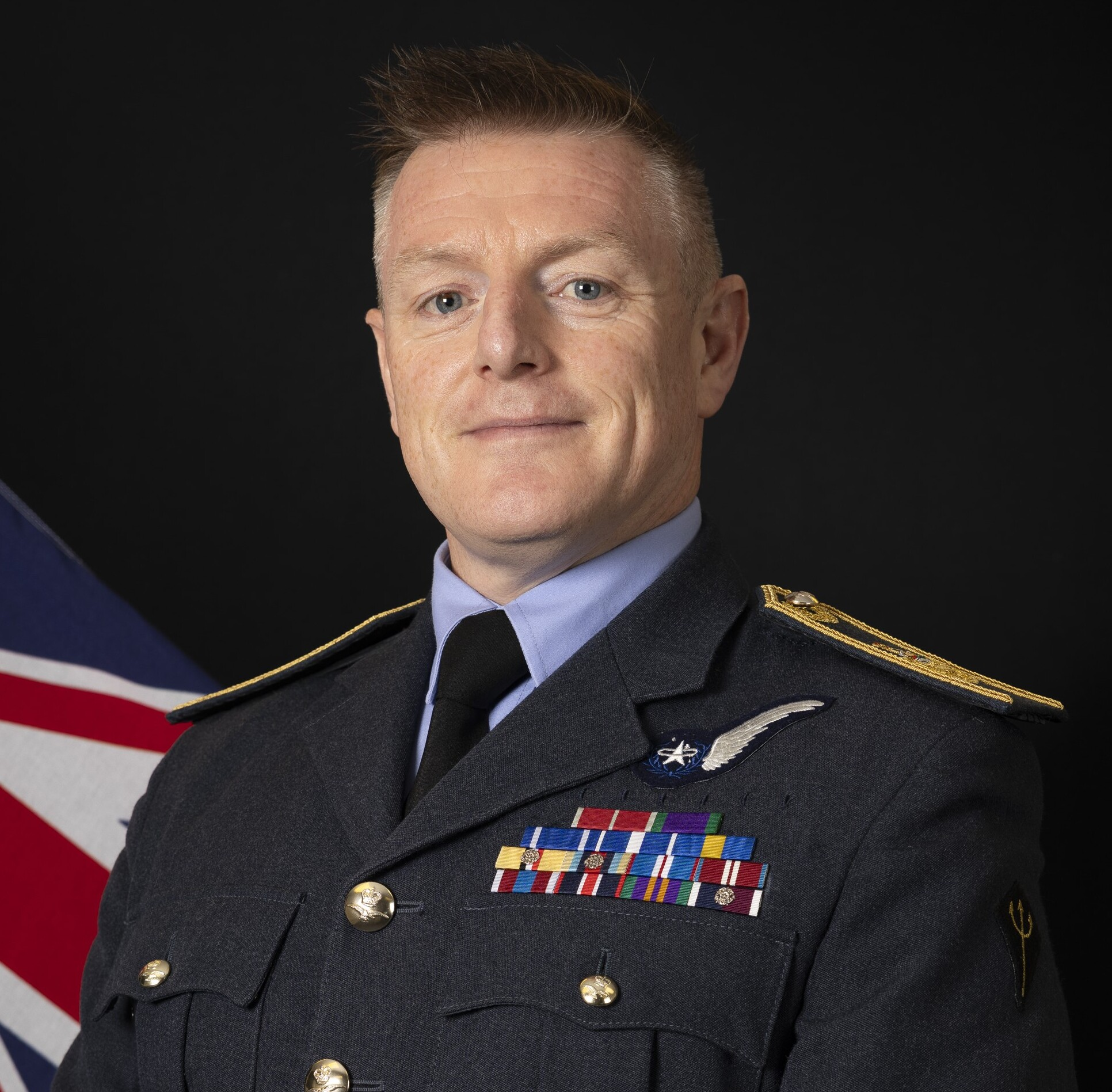
- Thompson in 2026
- Military career
- Allegiance: United Kingdom
- Branch: Royal Air Force
- Service years: 1997–
- Rank: Air Vice Marshal
- Commands: United Kingdom Space Command
- Awards: Commander of the Order of the British Empire

Air Vice-Marshal James William Stephen "Jamie" Thompson, CBE is a British senior Royal Air Force officer. Since June 2026, he has been Commander of the United Kingdom Space Command.

== Military career ==
In 1997, Thompson joined the Royal Air Force (RAF) in the other ranks as a weapons technician.

Thompson was Air Officer Force Protection (later renamed Air Officer Global Enablement) from 2022 to 2024, and was in December 2024 appointed deputy commander of United Kingdom Space Command. In April 2026, he was announced as the next Commander Space Command. He took up the appointment on 1 June 2026, when he was promoted to air vice-marshal.

In August 2026, Thompson was suspended from his post after being arrested after allegations of theft and a serious sexual offense. An alternative interim commander was appointed.

Military offices
Preceded by Paul Tedman	Commander United Kingdom Space Command; 2026–present	Incumbent
