= RAF High Wycombe =

Royal Air Force headquarters and administrative station in Buckinghamshire, England

RAF High Wycombe
- Walters Ash, Buckinghamshire in England
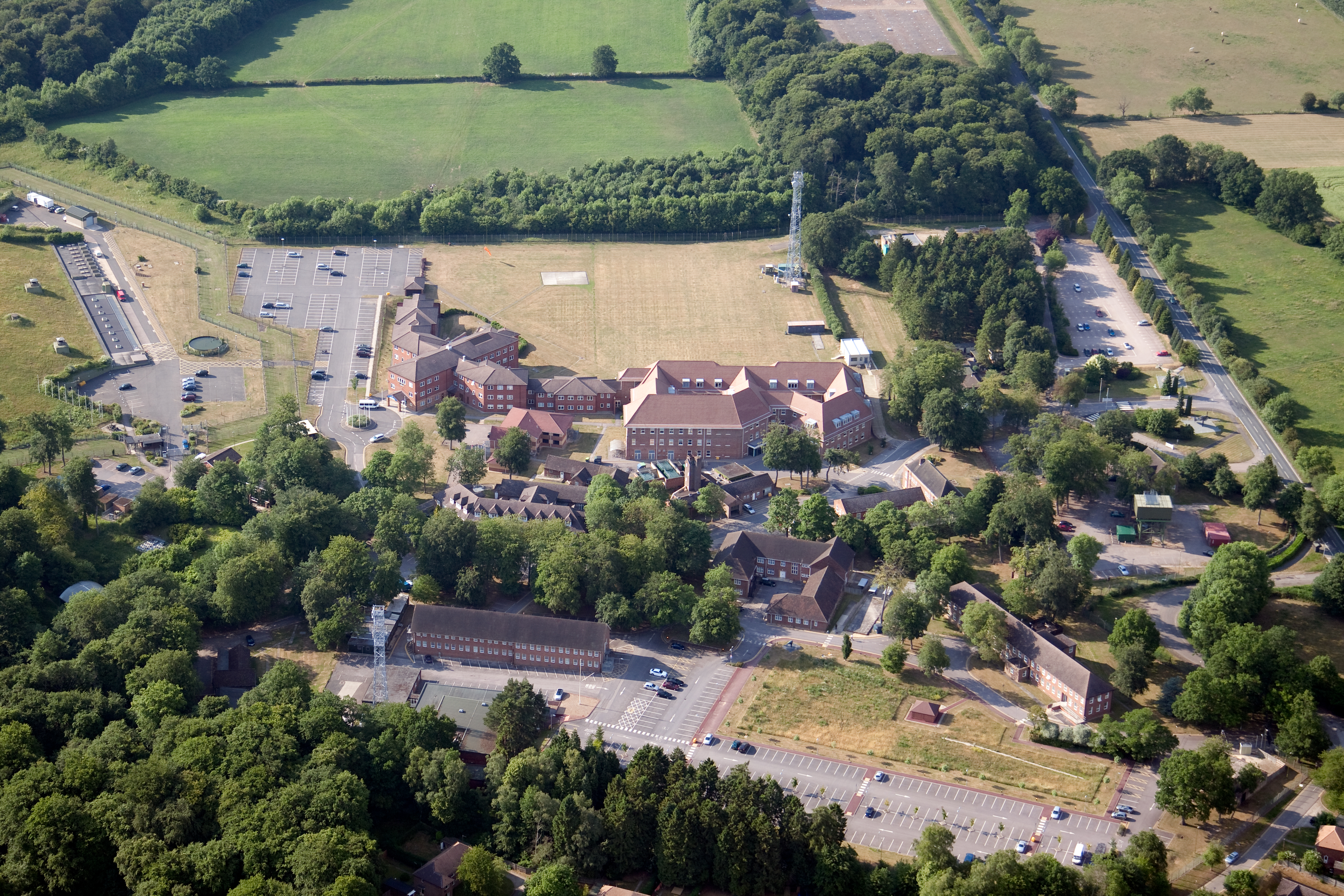
- Aerial view of RAF High Wycombe.

- Non sibi (Latin for 'Not for ourselves')

Site information
- Type: RAF non-flying station
- Owner: Ministry of Defence
- Operator: Royal Air Force
- Controlled by: RAF Air Command
- Website: Official website

Location
- Shown within Buckinghamshire
- Coordinates: 51°40′53″N 000°48′07″W

Site history
- Built: 1938
- In use: 1938 – present

Garrison information
- Current commander: Wing Commander Jenny Dennis
- Occupants: HQ RAF Air Command; Joint Force Air Component Commander; HQ No. 1 Group (Air Combat); Joint Ground Based Air Defence Headquarters; HQ No. 2 Group (Air Combat Support); No. 11 Group (Multi-domain Operations); HQ No. 22 Group (Training); HQ European Air Group; United Kingdom Space Command

Royal Air Force High Wycombe or more simply RAF High Wycombe is a Royal Air Force station, situated in the village of Walters Ash, near High Wycombe in Buckinghamshire, England. It houses Headquarters Air Command, and was originally designed to house RAF Bomber Command in the late 1930s. The station is also the headquarters of the European Air Group and the United Kingdom Space Command.

The location of the station was originally suggested by Wing Commander Alan Oakeshott when the Air Ministry was seeking a new, secure, site for Bomber Command away from London. Wing Commander Oakeshott was killed in combat in 1942 and is commemorated on the Naphill War Memorial and in the name of the station's welfare centre, opened in 2011.

The motto of RAF High Wycombe in Latin is 'Non Sibi', which translates as 'not for ourselves'.

== History ==
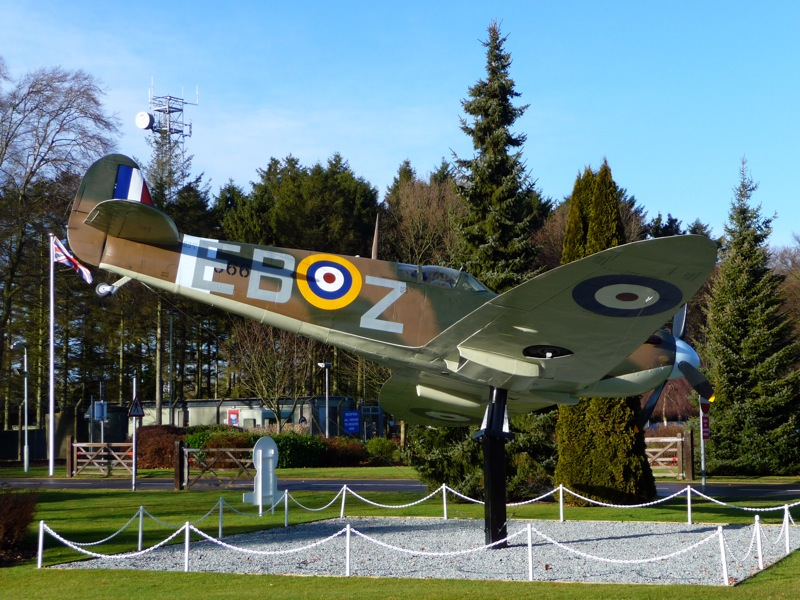
Supermarine Spitfire IIa, P7666, EB-Z, "Observer Corps", the personal mount of Olympic Hurdler and OC, 41 Squadron, Sqn Ldr Don Finlay, 1940–41, is the gate guardian at RAF High Wycombe.

=== Construction ===
Prior to the outbreak of the Second World War, the Air Ministry sought a safe location for RAF Bomber Command away from London. The wooded area near Naphill, Walters Ash and Lacey Green was suggested by Wing Commander Alan Oakeshott as ideal for this purpose, since the trees could provide natural camouflage from the air.

Buildings were designed to resemble other uses, such as the Officers' Mess which was built to look like a manor house. The fire station was built with a tower to resemble a village church. Trees were preserved as much as possible to maintain the camouflage they provided. Roads were laid out so as to avoid most trees. The building work was carried out by John Laing and Son, with 400 workmen and 80 specialists involved. Tunnels were dug to connect each block on the station, linked to an Operations Block built 55 feet (17 m) below ground.

To preserve secrecy, the station was known as "Southdown" in March 1940, as part of a directive by the Air Ministry. The site's postal address was given as "GPO High Wycombe."

Whilst High Wycombe was not an official flying station, a small airfield was used in the nearby village of Lacey Green, 1 mile (1.6 km) to the north. The airfield was unpaved and was used for small flights into and out of RAF High Wycombe and was only used between June 1944 and late 1945.

High Wycombe was also used by the 325th Photographic Wing, United States Army Air Forces, from 9 August 1944 until 20 October 1945.

=== Post-War ===
Headquarters, 7th Air Division of the Strategic Air Command, supporting SAC operations in UK relocated to High Wycombe from RAF South Ruislip in 1958, and commanded all SAC operations from there until 1965.

The station badge, incorporating a thunderbolt and two pillars to symbolise the support the station gave to Bomber Command, was approved on 23 November 1966. RAF Bomber Command merged with RAF Fighter Command to form RAF Strike Command at RAF High Wycombe on 30 April 1968. The station's title, Royal Air Force Station High Wycombe, was officially approved on 1 January 1969. From 1983 to 1984 there was a peace camp protesting against the building of a bunker there at that time to house RAF Strike Command.

On 1 July 1994, Headquarters Allied Forces North Western Europe (AFNORTHWEST) of NATO was established at High Wycombe.

RAF Strike Command merged with RAF Personnel and Training Command to form RAF Air Command at RAF High Wycombe on 1 April 2007. Since 2009, the station has been responsible for reviewing UFO sightings as part of efforts to identify any possible unauthorised military incursions into UK airspace. Civil servants tasked with reviewing such sightings relocated to the station from the Ministry of Defence Main Building in London.

The Ministry of Defence and Serco agreed a ten-year contract in February 2010 whereby Serco would provide support services at RAF High Wycombe and RAF Halton, including leisure services, general engineering and catering.

The actor David Jason officially opened the station's new welfare centre, named after Wing Commander Alan Oakeshott, in July 2011. An Armed Forces Community Covenant between the station and Wycombe District Council was signed on 16 April 2012, designed to strengthen the links between the military and the local community. Personnel exercised the station's Freedom of Wycombe District on 29 May 2012, parading through Princes Risborough.

== Based units ==
The following notable units are based at RAF High Wycombe.

=== Royal Air Force ===
Air Command

- Headquarters Air Command
- RAF Safety Centre
- RAF Digital

No. 1 Group (Air Combat)

- Headquarters No. 1 Group (Air Combat)

No. 2 Group (Air Combat Support)

- Headquarters No. 2 Group (Air Combat Support)

No. 11 Group (Multi-domain Operations)

Headquarters No. 11 Group (Multi-domain Operations)

- Joint Force Air Component Commander
- National Air & Space Operations Centre (NASOC)

No. 22 Group (Training)

- Headquarters No. 22 Group (Training)

=== Other ===
European Air Group

- Headquarters European Air Group

United Kingdom Space Command

- Headquarters UK Space Command
  - UK Space Operations Centre
    - 1 Space Operations Squadron

== See also ==
- List of Royal Air Force stations

== Sources ==
- Ritchie, Berry (1997). The Good Builder: The John Laing Story. James & James.
