= Cryers Hill =

Coordinates: 51.664052°N 0.735455°W

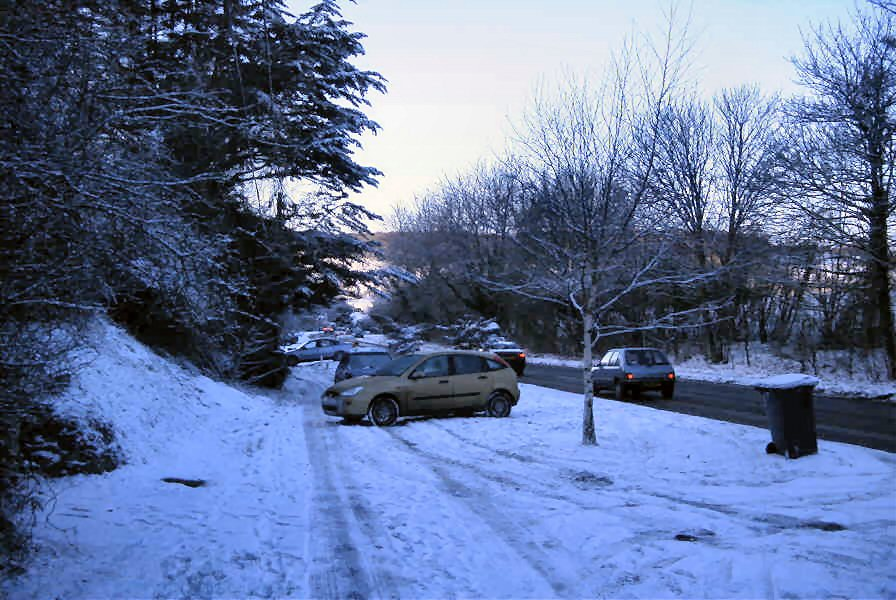
- Cryers Hill in Winter, 1999

- Location within Buckinghamshire
- OS grid reference: SU874969
- Civil parish: Hughenden
- Unitary authority: Buckinghamshire
- Ceremonial county: Buckinghamshire
- Region: South East
- Country: England
- Sovereign state: United Kingdom
- Post town: High Wycombe
- Postcode district: HP15
- Dialling code: 01494
- Police: Thames Valley
- Fire: Buckinghamshire
- Ambulance: South Central
- UK Parliament: Mid Buckinghamshire

Cryers Hill is a hamlet in the parish of Hughenden and in Buckinghamshire, England. It was formerly known as Ravensmere (sometimes 'Ravening').

The hamlet is situated between Great Kingshill, Hughenden Valley and Widmer End. Its primary school is called Great Kingshill school and the crematorium at Cryers Hill is called Hughenden Crematorium. This is located in Four Ashes Road.

The hamlet has a Post Office and Shop, Cryers Hill Post Office & Store.

The only pub within Cryers Hill is The White Lion.

The hamlet and surrounding area provided the setting for Kitty Aldridge's 2007 novel called "Cryers Hill". The book partly documents the significant expansion of housing in the area during the 1960s.

In Four Ashes Road, there is a large country house with a Georgian facade called 'Uplands' which is set in 18 acres (73,000 m^{2}) of gardens. It is now a 74-room De Vere Venues hotel and conference centre.

In recent years, an apparition of the Green Man is alleged to have been sighted on at least two occasions at Cryers Hill.
