= Tyche (satellite) =

UK military Earth observation satellite

- Mission type: Military Earth observation
- Operator: United Kingdom Space Command

Spacecraft properties
- Manufacturer: Surrey Satellite Technology

Start of mission
- Launch date: 16 August 2024
- Rocket: Falcon 9 (Transporter-11)
- Launch site: Vandenberg Space Force Base

Orbital parameters
- Reference system: Geocentric orbit
- Regime: Low Earth orbit

Tyche is a Britain's first Intelligence, Surveillance and Reconnaissance (ISR) satellite operated by United Kingdom Space Command. It was launched on 16 August 2024 aboard a Falcon 9 rocket as part of SpaceX's Transporter-11 rideshare mission.

The satellite provides optical imagery of the Earth in support of defence intelligence and other government uses.

== Background ==
Tyche was developed as part of UK plans to expand sovereign space-based intelligence and reconnaissance systems. The satellite was manufactured by Surrey Satellite Technology (SSTL).

Tyche is intended to be the first of four research and development satellites.

== Design ==
Tyche is a SSTL Carbonite-class microsatellite with a mass of about 160 kilograms (350 lb), carrying a high-resolution optical payload delivering sub-1 metre imagery of 5 kilometres (3.1 mi) wide ground areas, including video. Tyche has a planned five-year lifespan orbiting at an altitude of about 500 kilometres (310 mi) in a sun-synchronous orbit.

Belgian company Rhea and American Lockheed Martin are developing ground-based software to control the ISR satellites.

== Launch ==
Tyche was launched from Vandenberg Space Force Base in California on 16 August 2024 aboard a SpaceX Falcon 9 rocket. The mission formed part of SpaceX's Transporter-11 rideshare payload flight. It was the first satellite operated by UK Space Command to be placed into orbit.

== Mission ==
Tyche provides daytime imagery of the Earth to support military operations, disaster monitoring and related government tasks. The Defence Intelligence Fusion Centre at RAF Wyton has been involved in processing the imagery generated.
