= RAF High Wycombe bunker =

Military bunker in Buckinghamshire, England

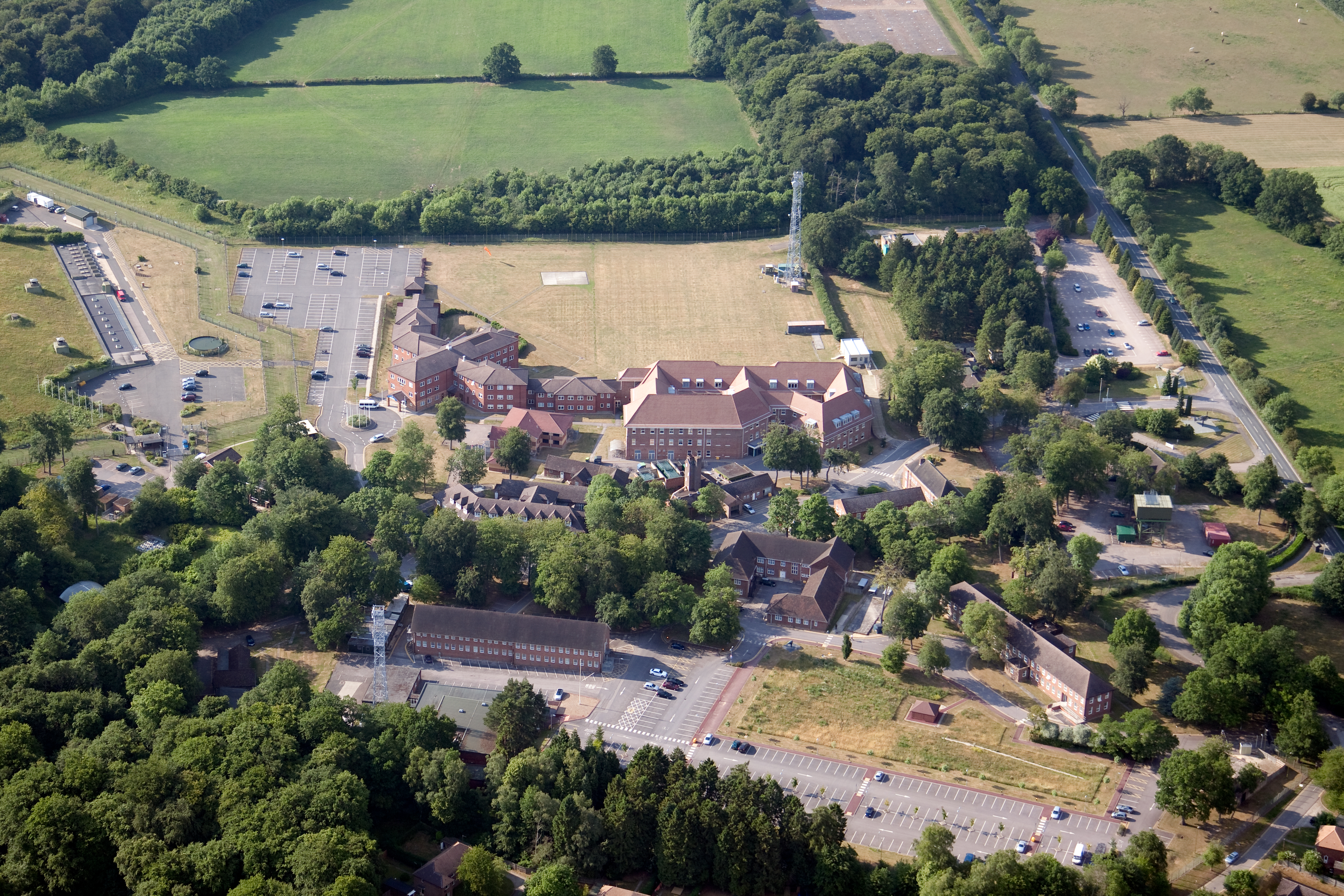
- RAF High Wycombe; the bunker is on the extreme left within the double barbed-wire fence

General information
- Status: Completed
- Type: Bunker
- Location: RAF High Wycombe, Walters Ash, England
- Coordinates: 51.6816°N 0.8062°W
- Ordnance Survey: SU826987
- Elevation: 195 metres (640 ft)
- Groundbreaking: 1982
- Completed: 1988
- Opened: 1989

The command bunker at RAF High Wycombe, in Buckinghamshire, England, was opened in 1989 to replace an earlier bunker on the site that dated back to before the World War II. The current bunker has been used to direct NATO led operations, and as direct command structure for British military forces in the Gulf War in 1991. The bunker is still in use to direct military operations (mostly for the Royal Air Force) and also acts as a safe haven for the UK Government.

== History ==
The Royal Air Force was granted permission to build a new headquarters for Bomber Command in the late 1930s in anticipation of World War II; this would include a bunker (located at 51.6800°N 0.8024°W) which had tunnels to various other buildings on site. When it was under construction, each tree was labelled and removed to another site to allow growth, then put back on top of the completed bunker in its original position when building work was completed, so that the bunker site would look the same from the air as it did before construction. During the Cold War, the bunker was the control element of the United Kingdom Regional Air Operations Centre (UKRAOC), collating radar information and passing it on. It was decreed that the original 1930s bunker was out of date by the 1980s, and plans were put forward for a newer site.

A replacement bunker was first proposed in the early 1980s. It was built on 12 acres (4.9 ha) of farmland belonging to Hollybush Farm, land which had been gifted to the National Trust. This caused some concern as it was felt by some members of the trust that they had ceded the land in breach of the original donation's intent, which determined that the land should be "inalienable". This meant that the National Trust could not subsequently then sublet the land, and one of its members took the case to court, where the judge decided that had the trust not acted as they did, then the Ministry of Defence would have obtained the land anyway under a compulsory powers act through Parliament. The Royal Air Force was granted a 99-year lease for the site, though the site was the location of a peace camp between 1983 and 1984, and objections were raised against its construction in the Houses of Parliament and the House of Lords. Even before the replacement bunker was built, the base at RAF High Wycombe was determined to be a target in the event of a nuclear war, due to the presence of the command and control bunker on site.

Construction of the new bunker involved the removal of over 160,000 cubic metres (5,700,000 cu ft) of earth, and it was built with 250,000 tonnes (280,000 tons) of cement, with over 2,000 miles (3,200 km) of steel rods which, combined, weighed more than 10,000 tonnes (11,000 tons). The bunker is 75 feet (23 m) deep over four storeys, and had an intended capacity of 600 personnel. It is set within a metal box, which acts like a Faraday Cage, and would negate the effects of the electrical pulse of a nuclear explosion. Work started in 1982, with completion in 1988, but RAF personnel did not start occupying the bunker until January of 1989.

The land and air operations for the First Gulf War (Operation Granby) were run from the bunker complex at High Wycombe. The site is still used to control the airspace around Britain, and is the command centre for kinetic RAF operations, air-to-air refuelling operations, and is also used as the HQ of Joint Force Air Component (JFAC). The bunker is the location for the National Air Defence Operations Centre (NADOC), which despatches the Quick Reaction Force (QRF) to aircraft within UK airspace which are not responding to controllers, have deviated from their flight plan, or have sent out a distress signal. The site also acts as a safe haven for the prime minister and the cabinet, should a nuclear event occur.

The United States Air Force base at Daws Hill, which is also near to RAF High Wycombe, also had a bunker for command and control during a nuclear conflict; this was also sometimes called the High Wycombe Bunker.
