= Nik Powell =

British businessman (1950–2019)

- Born: Nikolas Mark Powell; 4 November 1950; Great Kingshill, Buckinghamshire, England, United Kingdom
- Died: 7 November 2019 (aged 69); Oxford, England, United Kingdom
- Education: Ampleforth College, University of Sussex
- Occupations: Record label founder, film producer and company founder
- Known for: co-founder with Stephen Woolley of Palace Productions, co-founding Virgin Records with Richard Branson in 1972,
- Spouses: Merrill Tomassi (div.); Sandie Shaw (m. 1982; div. 1995)
- Children: 2

Nikolas Mark Powell (4 November 1950 – 7 November 2019) was a British businessman and one of the co-founders of Virgin Records with Richard Branson. After operating a mail-order company, a small record shop, and a recording studio, the partners established the label in 1972. It became one of the UK's major recording labels until its sale to EMI in 1992.

== Biography ==
Born in Great Kingshill, Buckinghamshire, England, Powell was educated first at Longacre School, Shamley Green, Guildford, Surrey, moving when he was seven to a small Catholic preparatory school, St. Richard's in Little Malvern, outside Malvern. From there he went to Ampleforth College, North Yorkshire, and subsequently spent a year at the University of Sussex.

In 1983, Powell and Stephen Woolley founded Palace Productions, which produced The Company of Wolves (1984), Mona Lisa (1986), and The Crying Game (1992). After presiding over the 1992 collapse of the company, Powell re-established himself in the film industry with Scala Productions and produced Fever Pitch (1997), Twenty Four Seven (also 1997), B. Monkey (1998), Last Orders (2001), and Ladies in Lavender (2004).

Powell was director of the National Film and Television School from 2003 to 2017 in England while maintaining his position as chairman of Scala Productions.

== Personal life and death ==
Powell's marriage to Merrill Tomassi, the sister of Richard Branson's first wife, ended in divorce. He then married singer Sandie Shaw and helped relaunch her career. They had two children, Amie and Jack, before divorcing in the early 1990s.

Powell died on 7 November 2019 in Oxford, aged 69; he had been receiving treatment for cancer.
