= Widmer End =

Hamlet in Buckinghamshire, England

Coordinates: 51.660°N 0.727°W

Widmer End is a hamlet in the parish of Hughenden, in Buckinghamshire, England.

The Village of Widmer End is situated about three miles north of High Wycombe town centre. In the last half century it has grown from a rural hamlet into a commuter suburb while still retaining much of its attractiveness. It boasts a population of about 2000, a church, a pub now closed after 150 years (Enterprise Inns the last owners), a school, some shops, and a village hall and recreation ground. The latter two are owned by the village itself and are the centre for many sports and social activities.

Widmer End has expanded significantly over the years, particularly inside the "George's Hill triangle" which adjoins Hazlemere. The centre of the old village is around a road junction overlooked by the Royal Standard public house.

A short distance to the south-west of Widmer End is the hamlet of Four Ashes, and Cryers Hill is to the west.

Author and former local girl Kitty Aldridge captures the 1960s expansion of Widmer End in her 2007 novel Cryers Hill.

The Widmer End newsletter is run by local residents to inform, entertain and promote community cohesion. Local businesses and schools are promoted and residents have the opportunity to write in, submit articles, poetry, opinion and inform other residents of local history.
