= United Kingdom Space Command =

Joint command of the British Armed Forces

- Founded: 1 April 2021 (5 years, 7 months)
- Country: United Kingdom
- Branch: Royal Navy; British Army; Royal Air Force
- Role: Space Operations
- Part of: Royal Air Force
- Headquarters: RAF High Wycombe, Buckinghamshire
- Website: www.raf.mod.uk/what-we-do/uk-space-command/

Commanders
- Interim Commander: Air Commodore Darren Whiteley

United Kingdom Space Command (UKSC) is a joint command of the British Armed Forces organised under the Royal Air Force, and staffed by personnel from the Royal Navy, British Army, Royal Air Force and the Civil Service. The UKSC has three functions: space operations, space workforce generation, and space capability.

UK Space Command was established on 1 April 2021, and from June 2026 is under the command of Air Vice-Marshal James Thompson. The new command has "responsibility for not just operations, but also generating, training and growing the force, and also owning the money and putting all the programmatic rigour into delivering new ... capabilities." UKSC headquarters is at RAF High Wycombe co-located with Air Command.

When fully operationally capable, UK Space Command will "provide command and control of all of Defence’s space capabilities, including [the] UK Space Operations Centre, Skynet communications, RAF Fylingdales, and other enabling capabilities." The command was initially planned to grow to about 650 personnel.

== Defence Command Paper and Space Strategy ==
In a March 2021 Defence Command Paper it was announced that part of the additional £1.4 billion allocated to support UK Space Command over the next decade would be used to develop a new Intelligence, Surveillance and Reconnaissance (ISR) satellite capability, following on from the Carbonite-2 technology demonstrator launched in 2018.

== History ==
On 22 April 2021 it was announced that Air Commodore Mark Flewin was to become Head Operations, Plans & Training, United Kingdom Space Command, Royal Air Force High Wycombe in May 2021.

In 2021, Commodore David C. Moody (Engineering Branch, RN) was posted in as Head of Space Capability for UK Space Command.

In February 2022, the first part of the Defence Space Strategy was published, which included the already announced extra investment of £1.4 billion over 10 years mostly for the development of the multi-satellite surveillance and intelligence ISTARI system. The strategy announced that the UK would adopt an "international by design" approach, and is the first state to publicly join the U.S. led Operation Olympic Defender, enabling international sharing of space resources and the synchronisation of space efforts. The UK will strengthen relations with the Five Eyes intelligence partnership.

Operational concept demonstrator satellites for the ISTARI system, with electro-optical sensors and onboard processing, are planned for launch in 2024, under project MINERVA, and operated in conjunction with the Defence Intelligence Fusion Centre. The first satellite, named Tyche, launched on 16 August 2024 on a SpaceX Falcon 9.

In February 2025, a £127 million contract was awarded to Airbus to design and build two synthetic-aperture radar (SAR) 400 kilograms (880 lb) satellites named the Oberon system, building on the capabilities of Tyche development satellite. These will form part of the MOD space-based ISTARI system which will deliver a constellation of satellites and ground systems by 2031.

In July 2026, the National Infrastructure and Service Transformation Authority gave a red confidence rating on the Skynet 6 development project, which indicates "major issues with project definition, schedule, budget, quality and/or benefits delivery, which at this stage do not appear to be manageable or resolvable" primarily because of workforce shortages and delays in the Skynet 6a satellite development.

As of September 2026, to augment the Skynet satellite communications service, the MOD had purchased about 1,000 SpaceX Starshield terminals, offering a military-grade service, and about 500 SpaceX Starlink civilian terminals for morale, welfare, recreation and training purposes. Dedicated Starshield terminals were first purchased in 2025.

From 2026 to 2030, the MOD financial allocation for space is £2.3 billion for satellite communications, £880 million for space-based ISR and space control, and £440 million for novel space technology. The 2026 Defence Investment Plan allocates £9 billion for new space capability from 2030 to 2035.

== Structure ==
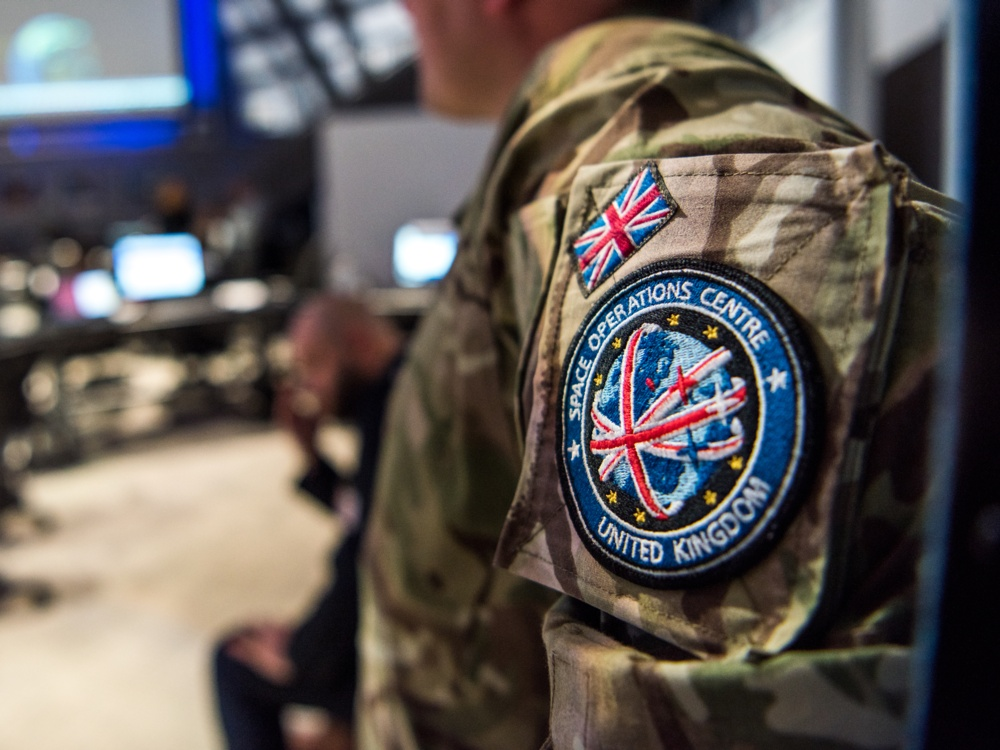
UK Space Operations Centre badge

UK Space Command includes:

- Headquarters, UK Space Command (RAF High Wycombe)
  - National Space Operations Centre
    - 1 Space Operations Squadron - military element of National Space Operations Centre
  - 2 Space Warning Squadron (RAF Fylingdales)
  - 3 Space Effects Squadron (formed September 2026)
  - UK Space Academy (Defence Academy, Shrivenham)

Another unit which is part of the UK Joint Force Space Component is the Multi-Role Space Squadron at RAF Waddington, which was established in August 2023. It is responsible for the operational test and evaluation of "novel" space capabilities.

== List of commanders ==
No.	Commander		Term			Ref.
No.	Portrait	Name	Took office	Left office	Term length	Ref.
1	Paul Godfrey	Air Vice-Marshal; Paul Godfrey	1 April 2021	12 May 2024	3 years, 41 days	
2	Paul Tedman	Major General; Paul Tedman (born 1972)	12 May 2024	31 May 2026	2 years, 19 days	
3	James Thompson	Air Vice-Marshal; James Thompson	1 June 2026 (suspended)	Incumbent	160 days	

== See also ==
- British Army communications and reconnaissance equipment § Satellite communications
- British space programme
- Defence Intelligence Fusion Centre
- Structure of the Royal Air Force
- RAF Oakhanger in Hampshire (1001 Signals Unit RAF), satellite communications site where Skynet was directed from until commercialisation in 2003
