= Naphill War Memorial =

War memorial in Buckinghamshire, England

Coordinates: 51.665199°N 0.776958°W

Naphill War Memorial is located at the junction of Main Road and Downley Road in Naphill, Buckinghamshire, England. It is a grade II listed building with Historic England and commemorates the men of the village who died in the First and Second World Wars.

Among the names on the memorial is that of Wing Commander Alan Oakeshott DFC of No. 105 Squadron Royal Air Force, who was killed in action in 1942.
