= Paul Tedman =

Senior British Army officer (born 1972)

Major General Paul Tedman CBE
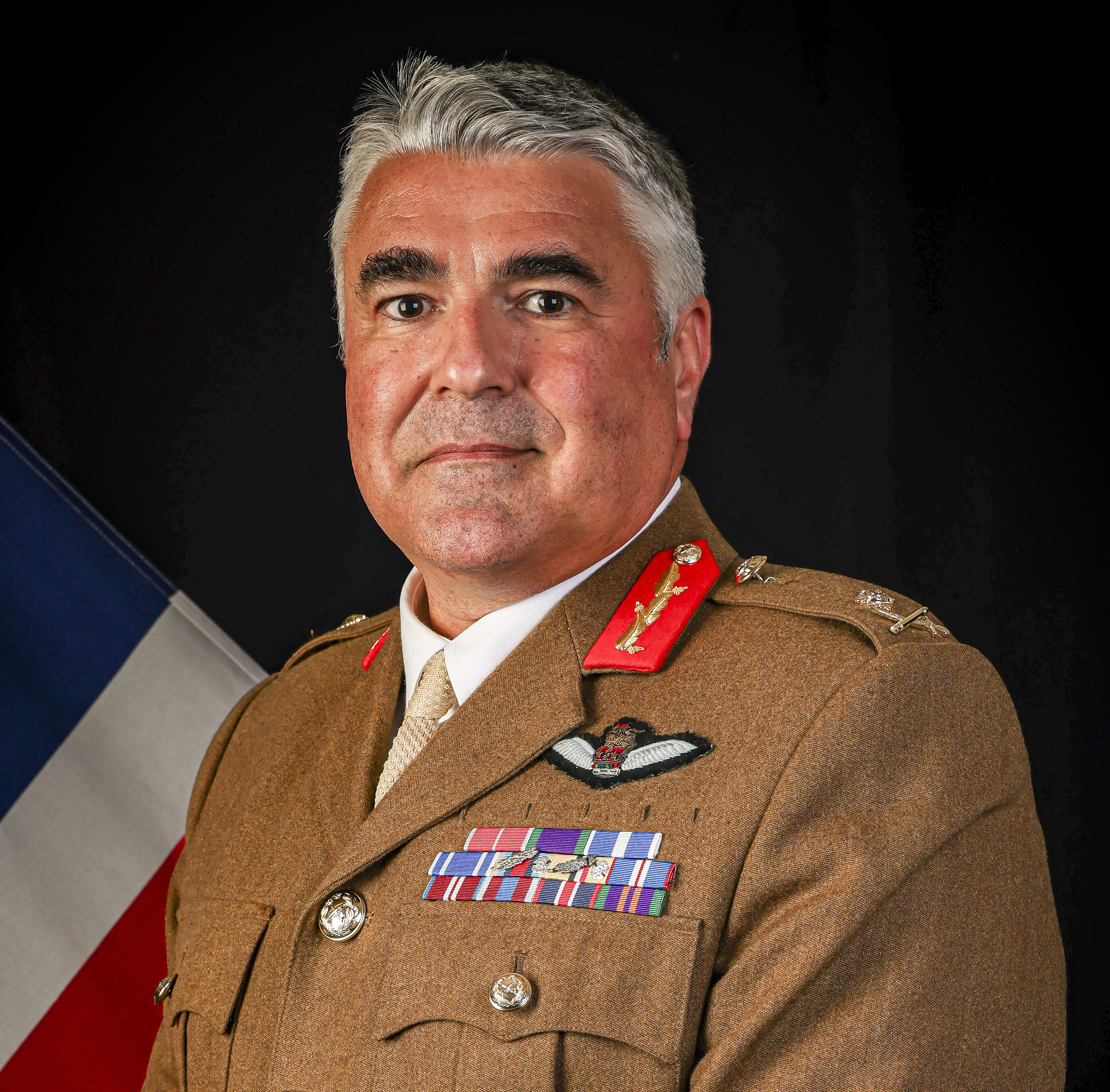
- Born: 24 October 1972 (age 53)
- Military career
- Allegiance: United Kingdom
- Branch: British Army
- Service years: 1995 – 2026
- Rank: Major General
- Commands: No. 661 Squadron AAC; 1 Regiment Army Air Corps; Aviation Reconnaissance Force; 1st Aviation Brigade; United Kingdom Space Command
- Conflicts: Iraq War; War in Afghanistan
- Awards: Commander of the Order of the British Empire

Major General Paul Terence Tedman CBE (born 24 October 1972) is a former senior British Army officer. From May 2024 to May 2026 he was commander of United Kingdom Space Command.

== Early life and education ==
Tedman has a bachelor's degree in aerospace engineering from Imperial College London and a master's degree in defence studies from King's College London.

== Military career ==
Tedman was commissioned into the Army Air Corps on 29 July 1995. Having qualified as a pilot, he was awarded his wings in 1999. He became officer commanding No. 661 Squadron AAC in 2008, Deputy Commander, Joint Special Forces Aviation Wing in 2010 and commanding officer 1 Regiment Army Air Corps in 2012. He went on to be commander of the Aviation Reconnaissance Force in 2016, Deputy Commander Joint Helicopter Command in October 2019 and commander 1st Aviation Brigade in April 2020. He was promoted to brigadier on 30 June 2020.

From 2021 to 2023, he served as an exchange officer at US Space Command in the role of deputy director of strategy, plans and policy. On 12 May 2024, he was appointed Commander United Kingdom Space Command and promoted to major general. He stepped down from this position in late May 2026, and retired from the Army on 9 September 2026.

== Honours ==
Tedman was awarded the Queen's Commendation for Valuable Service for services in Iraq on 23 April 2004 and the Queen's Commendation for Valuable Service for services in Afghanistan on 21 March 2014. In the 2020 New Year Honours, he was appointed a Commander of the Order of the British Empire (CBE) on 28 December 2019. In 2023, he was awarded the Legion of Merit by the President of the United States of America.

Military offices
Preceded by Paul Godfrey	Commander United Kingdom Space Command; 2024–2026	Succeeded by James Thompson
