= Alabukun =

Nigerian pain-relief powder and company

Alabukun is a popular indigenous Nigerian analgesic powder first produced in 1918 by Jacob Sogboyega Odulate in Abeokuta, Ogun State. It was created to relieve pain and headaches. It is considered the oldest pharmaceutical product in Africa and Nigeria and comes from the oldest surviving indigenous Nigerian-founded company. It is said to be the oldest indigenous founded company in sub-Saharan Africa. Alabukun became a staple household medicine across Nigeria and in parts of West Africa, like Benin, Togo and Ghana. Alabukun means "the blessed one" or "giver of grace" in Yoruba. It was sold in glass bottle form, before the modern plastic jars and sachet versions. The alabukun remains in powder form to he dissolved in water, as of old.

In addition to the flagship Alabukun Powder, Jacob Odulate developed several other products under the Alabukun brand. These included Alabukun Mentholine, a mentholated balm, and the Alabukun Almanac, an annual publication distributed across Nigeria that helped promote the brand and its remedies. Odulate's company also produced a range of other patent medicines and preparations. Over 100 years later, Alabukun is still sold in stores, pharmacies and open markets in Nigeria, West Africa and among the diaspora in Europe and North America.
