= Walters Ash =

Village in Buckinghamshire, England

Coordinates: 51.675°N 0.791°W

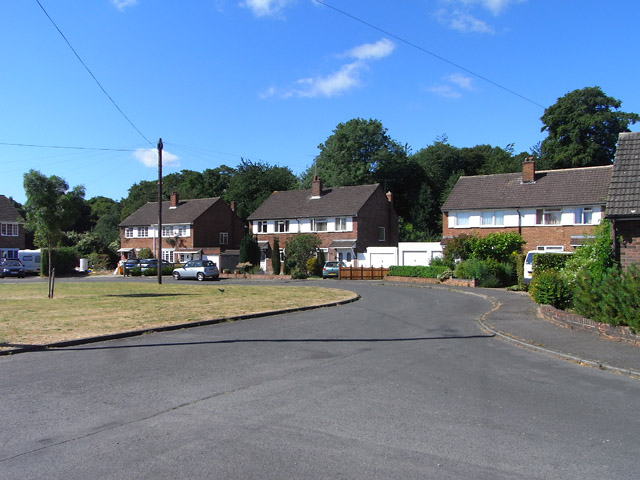
Ash Close, Walter's Ash, 2010

Walters Ash (also sometimes called Walter's Ash) is a village in the parish of Hughenden, in Buckinghamshire, England. It is located in the Chiltern Hills, to the west of the main village, adjacent to Naphill. Between 1983 and 1985 there was a peace camp outside RAF High Wycombe station. This was to protest about the RAF bunker on National Trust land designated a place of Historic Interest or Natural Beauty. There is also a water reservoir which was constructed at the same time. In February 2014 a sink hole opened under the drive of a bungalow and a car disappeared down it. The village is 32 miles (51 km) west of London and 3.92 miles (6.31 km) north west of High Wycombe.
