= Naphill Common =

Common land in Buckinghamshire, England

Coordinates: 51.66775°N 0.786073°W

- Site of Special Scientific Interest
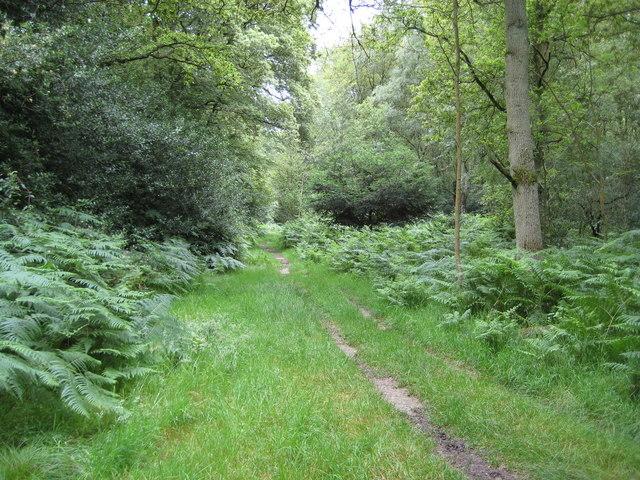
- Location of Naphill Common.
- Area of search: Buckinghamshire
- Grid reference: SU840972
- Interest: Biological
- Area: 71.1 ha (176 acres)
- Notification date: 1988
- Location map: Magic Map

Naphhill Common is a 71.1-hectare (176-acre) Site of Special Scientific Interest in Naphill in Buckinghamshire. It is in of the Chilterns Area of Outstanding Natural Beauty, and it is listed in A Nature Conservation Review. It is common land, with commoners' rights to estovers (the right to collect constructional materials), grazing (for cattle and swine) and firebote (the right to collect firewood).

This oak and beech wood is thought to be the most natural of all the Chilterns woodlands. It has diverse trees and shrubs, areas of acid heath, wet rides and ponds. Many of the oaks and beech trees are ancient pollards, and they provide an important habitat for invertebrates and lichens. Heathland clearings have some species which are uncommon in the county, such as heath bedstraw and the heather Calluna vulgaris.

There is access from Forge Road and Chapel Lane.
