= St Michael and All Angels Church, Hughenden =

St Michael and All Angels, Hughenden
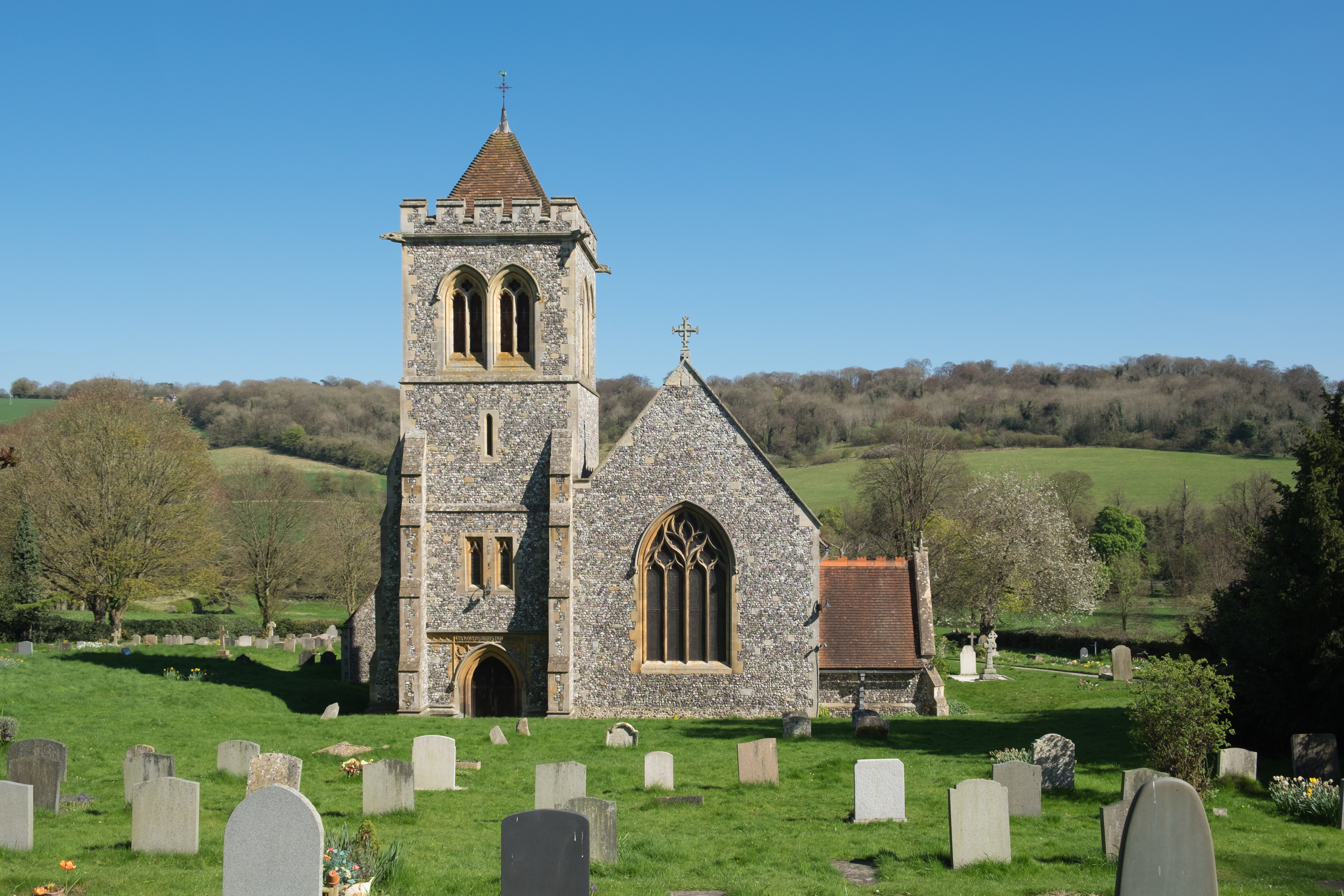
- St Michael and All Angels' Parish Church

- Location of St Michael and All Angels in Buckinghamshire
- 51°39′6.45″N 0°45′9.36″W
- Location: Hughenden Valley, Buckinghamshire
- Country: England
- Denomination: Church of England
- Website: www.hughendenparishchurch.org.uk

History
- Status: Parish church
- Founded: c. 1100–1135
- Founder: Geoffrey de Clinton

Architecture
- Heritage designation: Listed Grade: II*
- Style: Early English, extended Victorian Gothic

Administration
- Province: Canterbury
- Diocese: Oxford
- Archdeaconry: Buckingham
- Deanery: Wycombe
- Parish: Hughenden

St Michael and All Angels' Church is a Grade: II* listed Anglican church in the Hughenden Valley, Buckinghamshire, England, near to High Wycombe. It is closely associated with the nearby Hughenden Manor and the former Prime Minister of the United Kingdom, Benjamin Disraeli who is buried in the churchyard.

The church stands on land owned by the National Trust but the church and churchyard belong to the Church of England.

== History ==
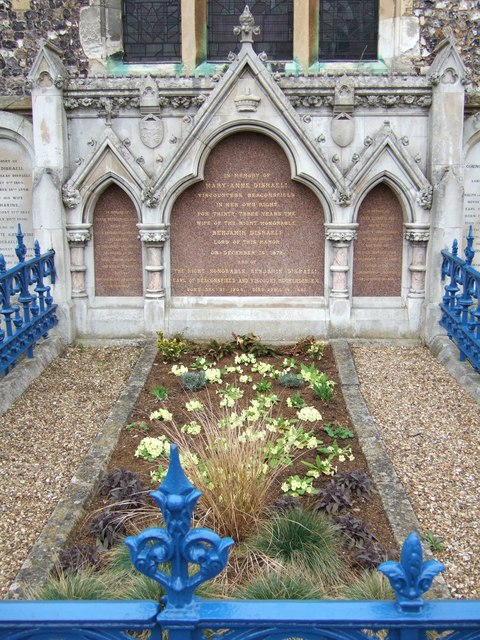
Disraeli's tomb

According to early records, a church existed on this site in the 12th century, built by Geoffrey de Clinton between 1100 and 1135. Monks established a small priory here in the building which is today used as a parish hall, Church House. The church itself is mediaeval in origin and this original building now forms the chancel and north chapel of the present building.

In 1848 Benjamin Disraeli purchased Hughenden Manor. The church was restored and extended between 1874 and 1890. Disraeli was British Prime Minister twice, in 1868 and 1874–80, and was made Earl of Beaconsfield in 1876. He died in 1881 and was buried in the family vault along with his wife Lady Beaconsfield (died 1872) which is located at the west wall of the church. Royal protocol did not permit Queen Victoria to attend the private funeral, but she visited the tomb a few days later to pay her respects.

== Architecture ==
The exterior walls of St Michael and All Angels are of flint with stone dressings and the roofs are tiled.

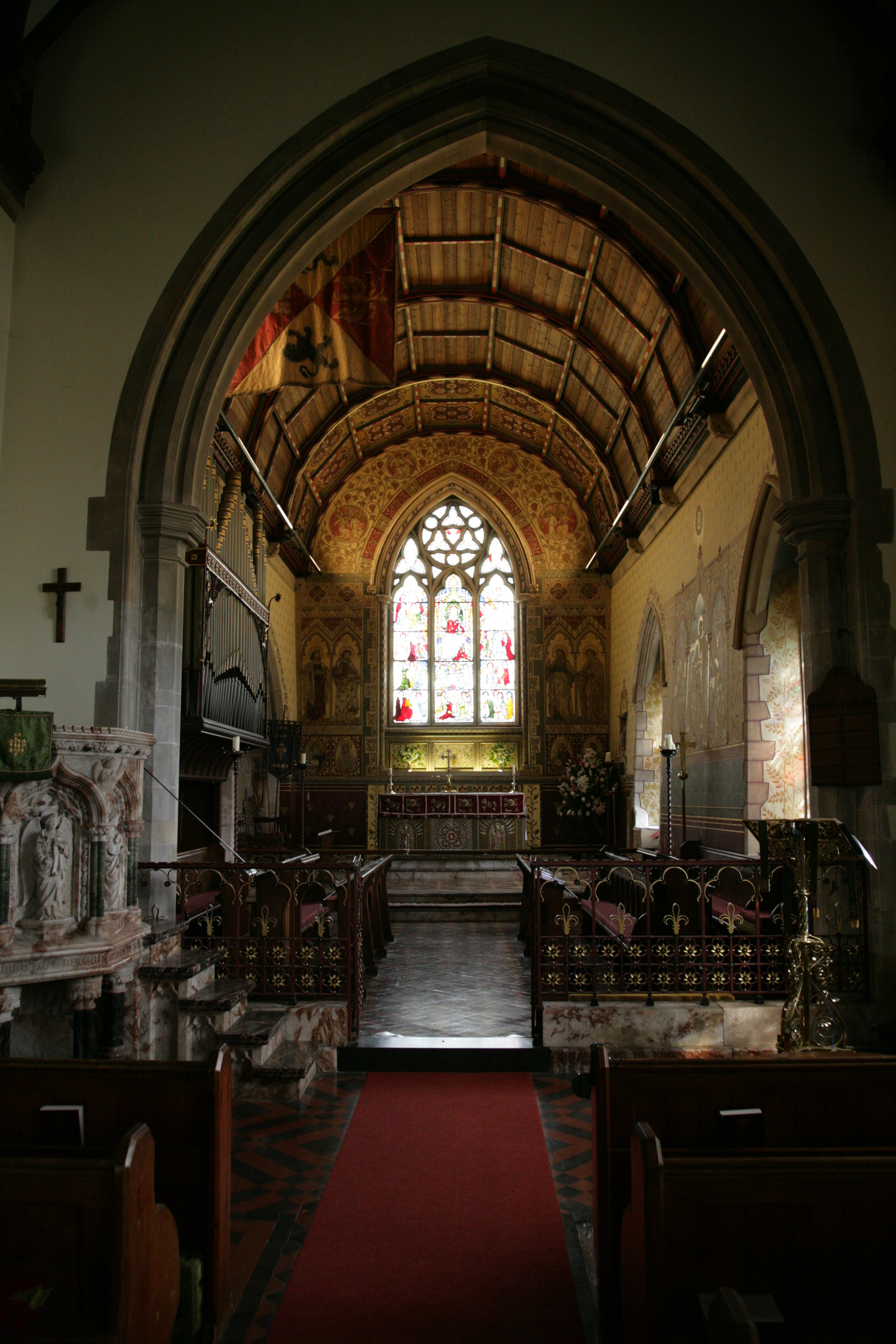
The rich Victorian decoration in the chancel

The oldest part of the church is the chancel, which was formed from the original mediaeval body of the church. When the church extension work was carried out, the floor was covered with ceramic tiles designed by Edward William Godwin and the walls decorated with 1881 wall paintings in the Aesthetic Movement style by Heaton, Butler and Bayne that depict the Nativity, the Four Evangelists and the Prophets.

A memorial to Disraeli was erected by Queen Victoria on the north side of the chancel following his death. It was the only memorial to be erected by a reigning monarch to one of her subjects in an English parish church. The inscription reads:

To the dear and honoured memory of Benjamin Earl of Beaconsfield.
This memorial is placed by his grateful sovereign and friend Victoria R.I. "Kings loveth him that speaketh right"

— Inscription on Disraeli memorial, 27 February 1882

The Banner and Insignia of the Order of the Garter hanging beside the memorial originate from St George's Chapel, Windsor.

Among the stained-glass windows are works by Thomas Willement and Clayton and Bell, including their 1881 East Window depicting Christ in Majesty which was installed as another memorial to Disraeli. The ornately carved marble and alabaster pulpit (c. 1891) is the work of Thomas Earp in the High Victorian style and features effigies of archangels in Gothic arches.

The memorials in the church include three recumbent effigies of knights, one lying cross-legged; although apparently in the style of the 13th century, the effigies have been ascertained to date from the 16th century and are thought to have been sculpted as fabricated evidence of the pedigree of the Wellesbourne family as descendants of Simon de Montfort.

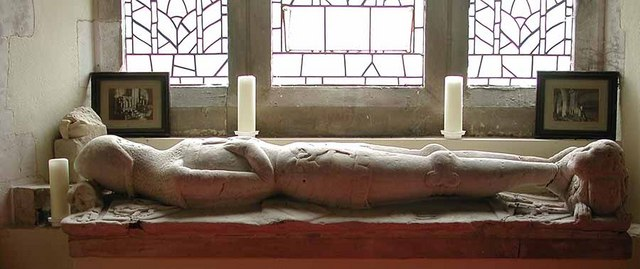
One of the effigies of knights

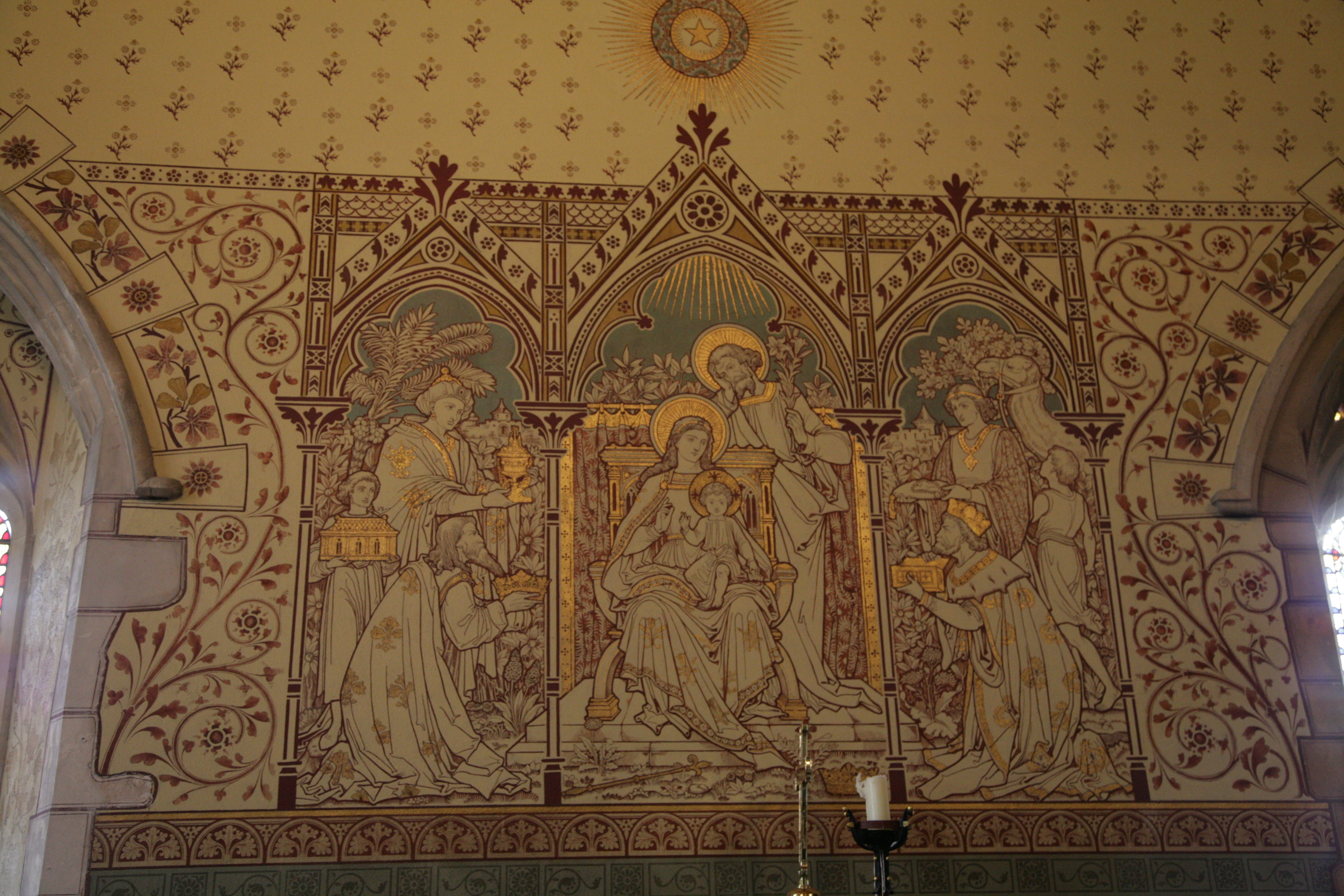
The Nativity, wall painting in the chancel

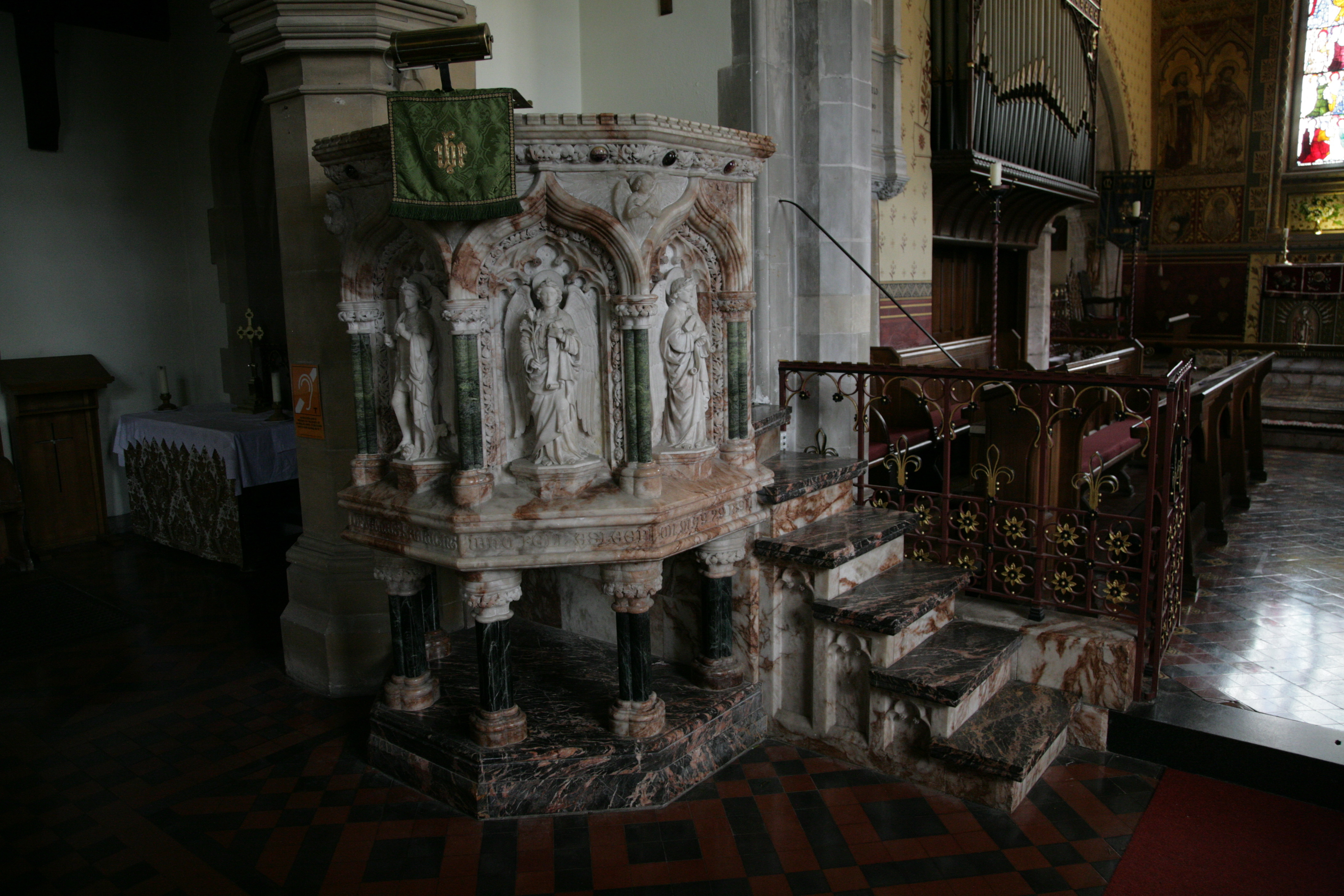
Pulpit featuring reliefs of archangels, from left: Michael, Gabriel, Uriel

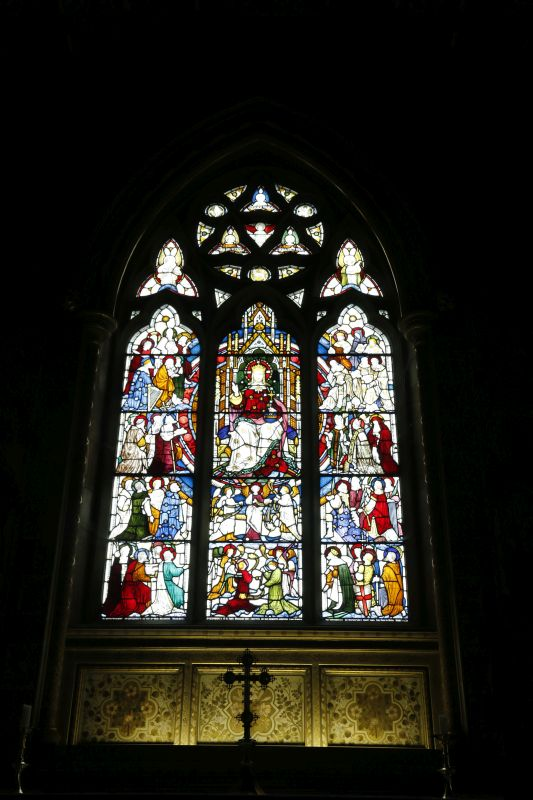
"Christ in Majesty", East Window in the chancel

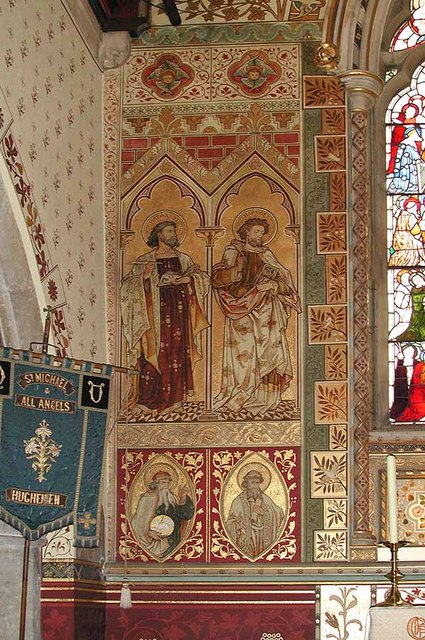
The evangelists Matthew and Mark

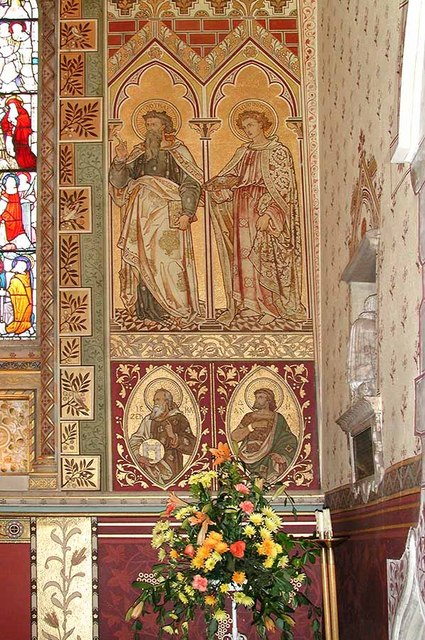
The evangelists Luke and Johh

== Use in film and television ==
St. Michael and All Angels' Church featured in the title sequence of Gerry Anderson's 1969 Supermarionation/Live Action television series The Secret Service.

It also featured briefly in the film Johnny English, in the funeral scene where a bomb kills all of Britain's secret agents.

Judi Dench filmed a scene from the film Victoria & Abdul in the grounds of the church – another scene was filmed in the manor house.
