= Defence Intelligence Fusion Centre =

British military intelligence organisation

The Defence Intelligence Fusion Centre (DIFC) is based at RAF Wyton in Cambridgeshire. Largely created from the staff of the National Imagery Exploitation Centre (formerly known as the Joint Air Reconnaissance Intelligence Centre (JARIC)) and then known for several years as the Defence Geospatial Intelligence Fusion Centre, it can trace its history back to clandestine reconnaissance operations at the beginning of the Second World War by Sidney Cotton on behalf of MI6 and then MI4, and the formation of the Allied Central Interpretation Unit at RAF Medmenham (sister to Bletchley Park).

Today, DIFC's role has grown beyond just imagery intelligence. Part of the Joint Forces Intelligence Group (JFIG) within Defence Intelligence, DIFC's primary role is to support Defence planning, current operations and the intelligence assessment process. DIFC still provides specialist imagery intelligence, but also conducts multi-disciplinary intelligence fusion for the armed forces and other UK Government partners. The integrated multi-disciplinary Task Groups at DIFC use data and reporting from various sources (including satellite imagery), together with other advanced technologies, to provide critical information and over-watch to tactical, operational and strategic decision makers.

As of 2014, DIFC was a joint service and civilian organisation under the command of an RAF Group Captain.

As of 2026, the DIFC has become known as the National Centre for Geospatial Intelligence (NCGI).

== History ==
Following a series of successful covert air reconnaissance operations run by the United Kingdom's Secret Intelligence Service (MI6) prior to World War II, the Photographic Development Unit (PDU) was established on 19 January 1940 (codenamed MI4) and later renamed Photographic Interpretation Unit (PIU) on 11 July 1940. Through a series of War Ministry reorganisations, the PIU was renamed the Central Interpretation Unit (CIU) on 7 January 1941 and changed again to the Joint Air Photographic Intelligence centre (UK) JAPIC [UK] in August 1947. On 17 December 1953 the unit was given the name of Joint Air Reconnaissance Intelligence Centre [UK] - JARIC [UK].

The JARIC Photographic Wing moved to Brampton near Huntingdon in Cambridgeshire from locations at Medmenham, Nuneham Park, Wyton and Wembley in 1956 where they were joined by the Joint School of Photographic Interpretation (JSPI) in December.

In 1980 the (UK) was dropped from the name to reflect the closing of the Cyprus-based JARIC (ME), later JARIC (NE) in April 1975. On 19 April 1996 the unit ceased to fall under operational control of the Royal Air Force and became an agency under the operational control of the Director General Intelligence and Geographic Requirements, taking a more centralised government role within the Ministry of Defence.

On 1 April 2000 the unit stopped functioning as an independent agency and merged with Military Survey into the Defence Geographic and Imagery Intelligence Agency (DGIA).

On 10 October 2005 the JARIC name ceased to be an acronym to reflect the fact that its sources of imagery had shifted away from those provided by UK Air Reconnaissance platforms to be predominantly satellite imagery based. The descriptor ‘The National Imagery Exploitation Centre’ was added to the JARIC title to better explain JARIC's role, not just within the Ministry of Defence but within the wider UK intelligence community.

On 10 June 2006, DGI (as it became after agency status was removed) was renamed the Intelligence Collection Group (ICG) and, after moving under the Joint Forces Command (JFC) on 1 April 2012, was renamed to Joint Forces Intelligence Group (JFIG) which consisted of the Defence Geographic Centre (DGC) based at Feltham, Middlesex, the Joint Signals Support Organisation (JSSO), based at RAF Digby, the Joint Aeronautical and Geographic Organisation (JAGO) at Hermitage and RAF Northolt and JARIC-The National Imagery Exploitation Centre based at RAF Brampton.

On 13 July 2012, after the formal retiring of the title JARIC, the unit was renamed the Defence Geospatial Intelligence Fusion Centre (DGIFC).

The Joint Forces Intelligence Group (JFIG) achieved Full Operating Capability in 2014, the culmination of the PRIDE (Wyton) Programme. The commander of JFIG said at the ceremony on 17 September 2014:

The PRIDE (Wyton) Programme was a £308m project to relocate JFIG Command elements, Geospatial intelligence, Human intelligence and 42 Engineer Regiment from Brampton, Feltham and Hermitage to new purpose-built facilities at Wyton. Within the new Pathfinder Building at Wyton, the Joint Intelligence Operations Centre (JIOC) coordinates Intelligence, Surveillance and Reconnaissance (ISR) for Defence, while the DIFC brings together Geospatial intelligence for the Nation and Intelligence Fusion for Defence. Wyton is developing as a Geospatial and Intelligence hub, collocating elements of Defence Intelligence, Service intelligence organisations, Agencies and Allies.

— Brigadier Nick Davies

Since 2020, the DIFC has become known by 2026 as the National Centre for Geospatial Intelligence (NCGI), providing intelligence support to UK Armed Forces.

== Relocation to Pathfinder Building at RAF Wyton (PRIDE Programme) ==
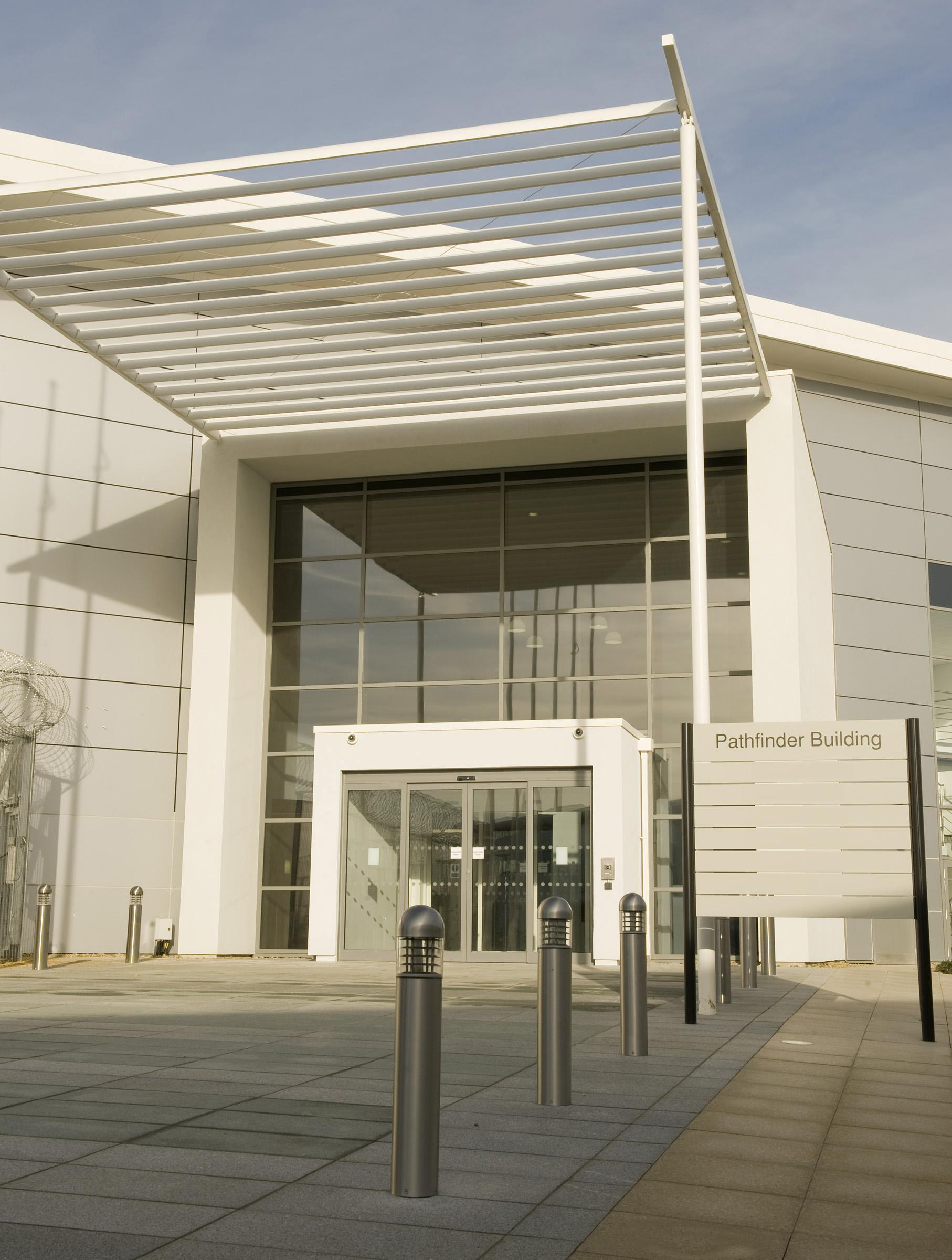
Pathfinder Building, RAF Wyton

In 2013, DGIFC relocated from RAF Brampton to the Pathfinder Building at RAF Wyton creating a multi-intelligence, open plan environment aimed at improving collaboration and innovation changing its name to DIFC on 17 Sept 2014.

DGIFC moved to RAF Wyton as part of the Programme to Rationalise and Integrate the Defence Intelligence Estate (PRIDE), which enabled Defence Intelligence, and the Joint Forces Intelligence Group in particular, to further improve and enhance support to operations and strategic threat assessments. The programme relocated the Joint Forces Intelligence Collection Group (JFIG -HQ) from Feltham, DGIFC - from RAF Brampton, as well as 42 Engineer Regiment (Geographic) from Denison Barracks in Hermitage and Ayrshire Barracks in Germany, to RAF Wyton in Cambridgeshire.

As of 2020, personnel from the Five Eyes intelligence alliance worked at the DIFC, and GCHQ and the U.S. Defense Intelligence Agency had desks there, in a space with a crisis capacity for 1,200 personnel.

== Areas of expertise ==
DIFC's role has evolved from the more traditional photographic analysis to encompass more technical intelligence disciplines such as:

=== IMINT (IMagery INTelligence) ===
IMINT is an intelligence gathering discipline which collects information via satellite and aerial photography. DGIFC is involved in all aspects of imagery analysis from basic activity reporting to advanced scientific-based MASINT analysis.

=== MASINT (Measurement And Signatures INTelligence) ===
MASINT is scientific and technical intelligence derived from the analysis of data obtained from sensing instruments for the purpose of identifying any distinctive features associated with the source, emitter or sender, to facilitate the latter's measurement and identification. DIFC is the UK's only provider of ‘imagery derived MASINT’ otherwise known as AGI or Advanced Geospatial Intelligence.

=== GEOINT (GEOspatial INTelligence) ===
GEOINT is an intelligence discipline comprising the exploitation and analysis of geographically determined information. GEOINT sources include imagery and mapping data, whether collected by commercial or military satellites, or by other capabilities such as UAV (Unmanned Airborne Vehicle) or reconnaissance aircraft.

== British satellites used ==
=== Carbonite-2 ===
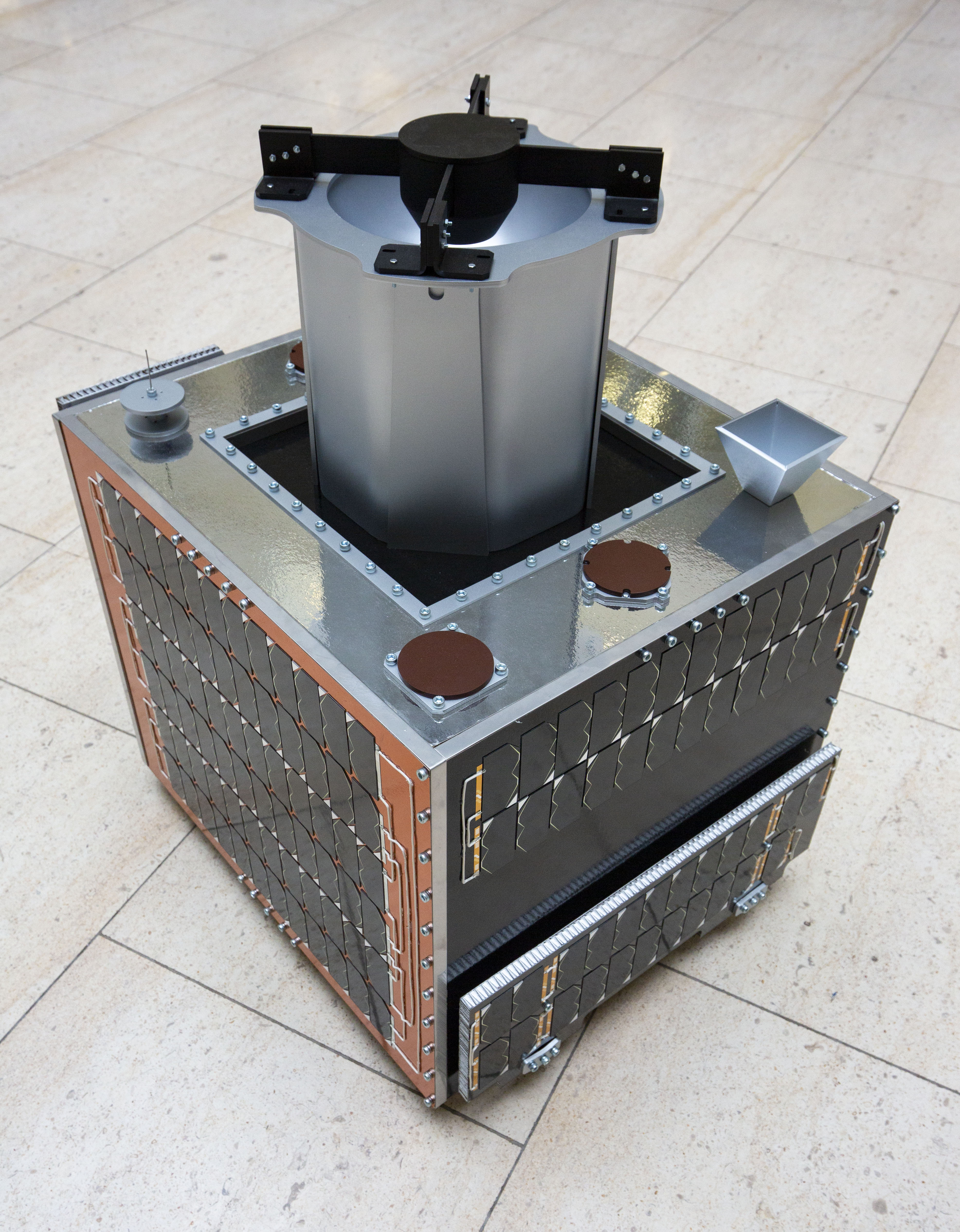
Model of Carbonite-2

In 2017-18 the MOD invested £4.5 million in a programme to deliver high-quality imagery and 3D video footage from space, with the Surrey Satellite Technology (SSTL) Carbonite-2 satellite being the first technology demonstrator. Carbonite-2 uses commercial off-the-shelf (COTS) components and has a mass of about 100 kg, and was launched on the Polar Satellite Launch Vehicle PSLV-C40 from Satish Dhawan Space Centre in India on 12 January 2018. Data from Carbonite-2 is processed by the centre's Geospatial Intelligence staff. This programme is part of the RAF's vision of a future constellation of imagery satellites.

On 18 July 2019, Defence Secretary Penny Mordaunt announced another small satellite demonstrator would be launched within a year, working toward producing high-resolution video to support battle awareness. A joint UK and US defence and industry group named Team ARTEMIS will work on the project.

=== Tyche ===
On 16 August 2024, the UK's first Intelligence, Surveillance and Reconnaissance (ISR) satellite was launched by a SpaceX Falcon 9. Named Tyche, it is a SSTL Carbonite-class microsatellite with a mass of about 160 kilograms (350 lb), carrying a high-resolution optical payload delivering sub-1 metre imagery of 5 kilometres (3.1 mi) wide ground areas, including video. Tyche has a planned five-year lifespan orbiting at an altitude of about 500 kilometres (310 mi) in a sun-synchronous orbit. It is intended to be the first of four research and development satellites, the others named Juno, Oberon, and Titania. Belgian company Rhea and American Lockheed Martin are developing ground-based software to control the ISR satellites.

=== Oberon system ===
In February 2025, a £127 million contract was awarded to Airbus to design and build two synthetic-aperture radar (SAR) 400 kilograms (880 lb) satellites named the Oberon system, building on the capabilities of Tyche. These will form part of the MOD space-based Intelligence, Surveillance, and Reconnaissance programme (ISTARI) which will deliver a constellation of satellites and ground systems by 2031.

== See also ==
- British intelligence agencies
- Ministry of Defence
- National Collection of Aerial Photography
- RAF Intelligence
- List of intelligence agencies
- MI4
- Skynet (satellite)
