= Jacob Odulate =

Nigerian inventor

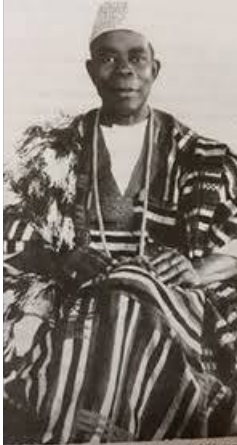
- Odulate in his chieftaincy regalia and wearing a saki (specially for chief) over his shoulder
- Born: Jacob Sogboyega Odulate; 1884; Ikorodu, lagos, Nigeria
- Died: 1962 (aged 77–78); Creek Hospital, Onikan, Lagos
- Education: Elementary School until age of 12; self-taught since then
- Occupation: Inventor
- Successor: Segun ODULATE
- Children: Dr. Jacobson Oladele ODULATE (Eye Surgeon) Segun ODULATE (Physicist & Business Entrepreneur - Successfully ran Alabukun in '70s & '80s Folake Solanke; Albert Olukoya; Grand Children:Eldest - Julian Olayinka Olatokunbo ODULATE (m) Bola Odulate (f) Akin ODULATE (m) Koye ODULATE - Currently running Alabukun (m) I ODULATE (f) Toyin Odulate (f) Dayo Odulate (f) Gboly Odulate (m)

Jacob Sogboyega Odulate (1884–1962), aka Blessed Jacob was a Yoruba Nigerian pharmacist, essayist, entrepreneur and inventor of Alabukun, a patent medicine.

== Early life ==
From a polygamous family of Pa Odulate, Jacob Odulate was born at Ikorodu, Lagos state in 1884. His maternal grandfather was Chief Aina Odukanmade, the first Mosene, whose father hailed from the Senlu branch of the Ranodu royal family of Imota, a town near Ikorodu. When he was 14 years old he left his father's house at Ikorodu to Abeokuta, Ogun State in which he trekked for 3 months to get to his destination. While at Abeokuta, he met a pharmacist named Dr. Sapara under whom he got the basic knowledge of curative products.

As a young man, Jacob established his own manufacturing company called Alabukun where he produced all sort of patents drugs.

== Alabukun drug ==
It was in 1918 (a year of intense British colonization), on an evening at his modest, but cherished “headquarters” in Sapon in Abeokuta where he had built his company headquarters which is a combination of place of work, office, consulting room and a laboratory workshop. He managed to invent the Alabukun brand on that particular day with assistance from his wife and children. He was also able to produce other brands like Alabukun Mentholine and an annual journal called Alabukun Almanac which was widely distributed in Abeokuta and environs between 1920 and 1950.

While producing it, most of its ingredients were gotten from Liverpool in United Kingdom. Alabukun Powder contains acetylsalicylic acid and caffeine as its active ingredients. A pouch of Alabukun contains 760 mg of acetylsalicylic acid and 60 mg of caffeine making a total of 820 mg plus other bulking agent and preservatives making 1000 mg powder content while the weight of a pouch is approximately 1400 mg. It is used for host of other things which include migraine, toothache, sore throat, prevention of blood clots, neuralgias, myocardial infarction, transluminal angioplasty and ischaemic attacks. The pharmacodynamics of Alabukun powder show that it functions by preventing the production of platelet aggregation and inhibits adenosine in the body. These functions reduce pain and allows the user to breathe better by stimulating the brain and the heart. It's possible side effects if not properly use include: swelling due to fluid accumulation, asthma, vomiting, nausea and vertigo.

For 100 years, the brand has remained relevant selling in all parts of Nigeria, the Benin Republic, Cameroon, Ghana and some parts of Europe.The Alabukun brand is currently under the management of koye ODULATE, one of the grand children of Chief Jacob Odulate.

== Family ==
He was married to Sekumade Abiodun Odulate. He made sure his children were well educated. From the return of his investment he sent his children to study at Durham, Newcastle, the United States and London to qualify as educationists, medical doctors, lawyers and engineers. One of his surviving children is Chief Mrs. Folake Solanke née Odulate who was the first female SAN in Nigeria.
