= Paul Godfrey (RAF officer) =

Royal Air Force officer

Air Marshal Paul Godfrey CB OBE
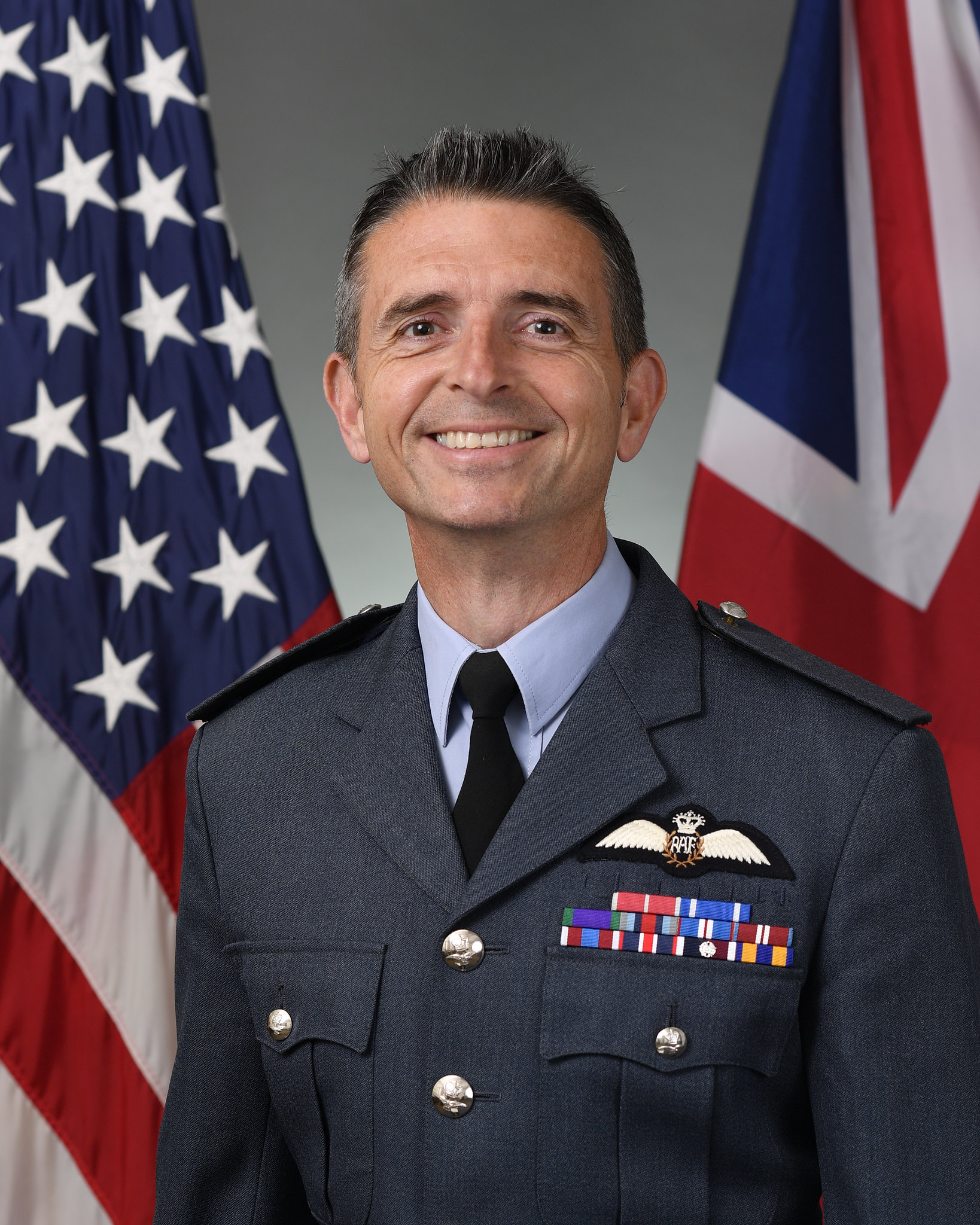
- Official portrait, 2024
- Military career
- Allegiance: United Kingdom
- Branch: Royal Air Force
- Service years: 1991–present
- Rank: Air Marshal
- Commands: United Kingdom Space Command
- Conflicts: War in Afghanistan
- Awards: Companion of the Order of the Bath; Officer of the Order of the British Empire

Air Marshal Paul Alexander Godfrey, CB, OBE is a senior Royal Air Force officer, who served as the first commander of the United Kingdom Space Command.

== Early life and education ==
Godfrey grew up in RAF Kenley, south of London. He was educated at Trinity School of John Whitgift, then an all-boys private school in the London Borough of Croydon. While at school, he was a member of the Combined Cadet Force, and gained his private pilot licence at 17.

== Military career ==
Godfrey was commissioned into the Royal Air Force on 9 May 1991. He served as a Harrier jump jet pilot. In 2006, while holding the rank of squadron leader, he was awarded the Air Medal by the president of the United States "in recognition of gallant and distinguished services during coalition operations in Iraq". He became station commander at RAF Lossiemouth in Scotland in November 2015.

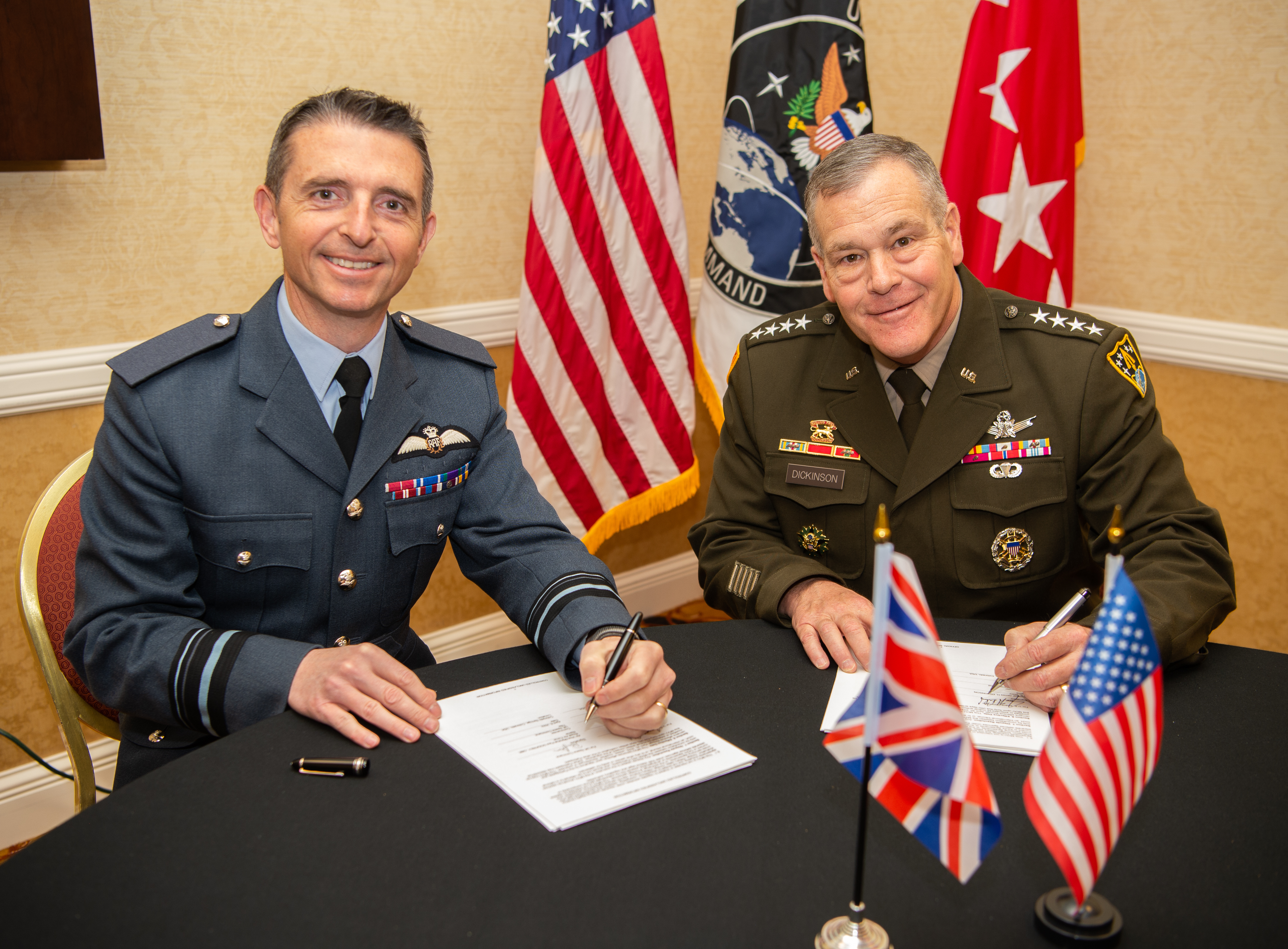
Godfrey (left) with Gen. James Dickinson, U.S. Space Command commander (right), in April 2022

In February 2021, it was announced that he would become the first Commander, United Kingdom Space Command. He took up the post on 8 March 2021 and was promoted to the rank of air vice-marshal. In December 2023, it was announced that he would take up the post of Director Capability at Strategic Command in June 2024. However, in June 2024, he instead took up the appointment of assistant chief of space operations for future concepts and partnerships with the United States Space Force and based at The Pentagon. He was promoted to air marshal on 15 June 2024.

Godfrey was appointed Officer of the Order of the British Empire (OBE) in the 2014 Birthday Honours. He was appointed a Companion of the Order of the Bath (CB) in the 2025 New Year Honours.

== Honours and awards ==
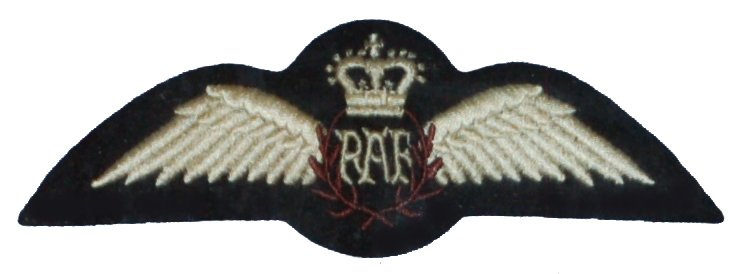

| Ribbon | Description | Notes |
| | Companion of the Most Honourable Order of the Bath | Appointed in 2025 |
| | Officer of the Order of the British Empire | Appointed in 2014 |
| | NATO Medal for the former Yugoslavia (1992-2002) | |
| | General Service Medal (1962) | |
| | Operational Service Medal Iraq and Syria | |
| | Queen Elizabeth II Golden Jubilee Medal | |
| | Queen Elizabeth II Diamond Jubilee Medal | |
| | Queen Elizabeth II Platinum Jubilee Medal | |
| | King Charles III Coronation Medal | |
| | Royal Air Force Long Service and Good Conduct Medal | With Clasp |
| | Air Medal (United States) | |

Military offices
| New title | Commander United Kingdom Space Command; 2021–2024 | Succeeded by Paul Tedman |
| New title | Assistant Chief of Space Operations for Future Concepts and Partnerships of the United States Space Force; 2024–present | Incumbent |
