= Hughenden Valley =

Village in Buckinghamshire, England

Coordinates: 51.6558°N 0.7490°W

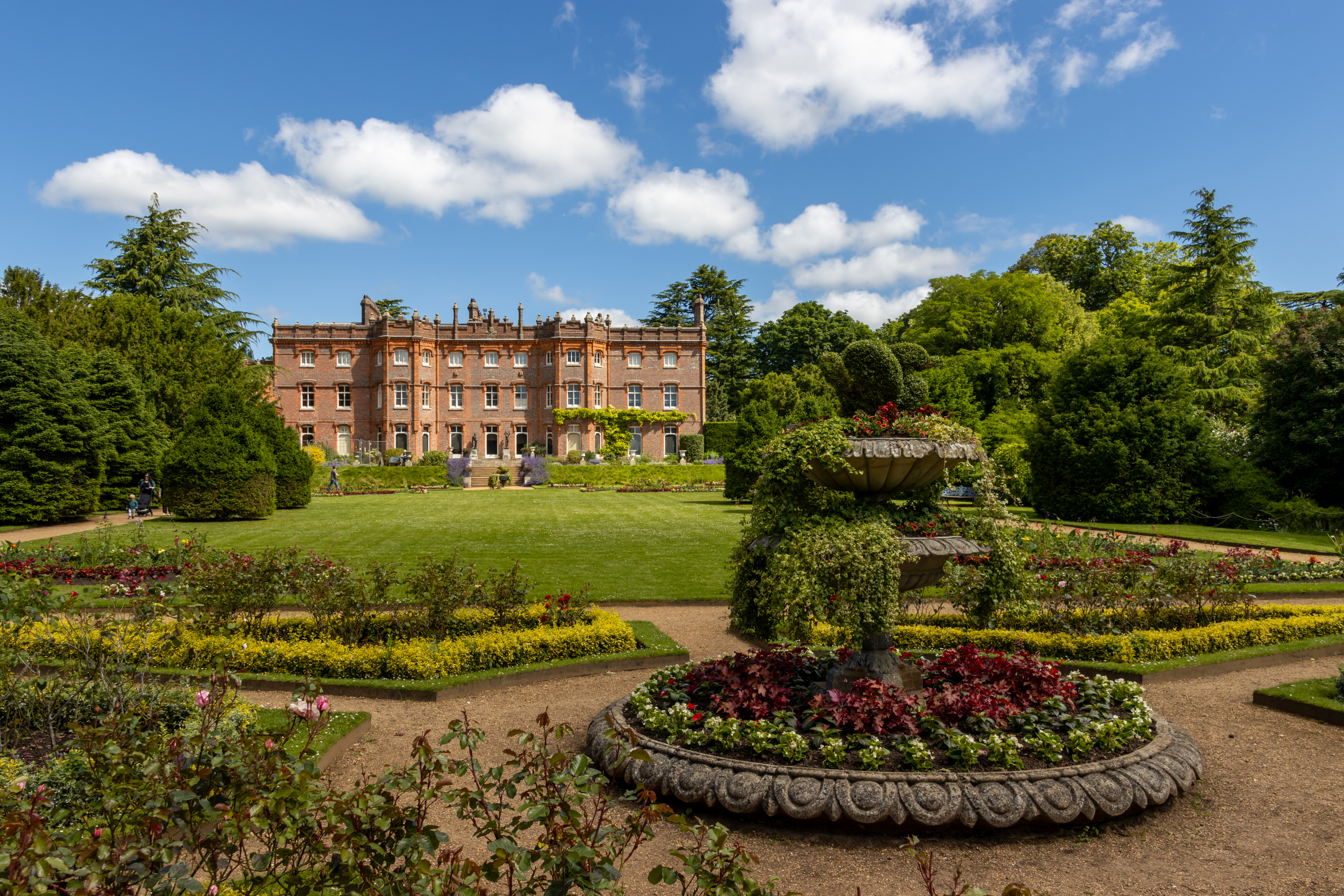
- Hughenden Manor

- Location within Buckinghamshire
- Population: 8,362 (2011)
- OS grid reference: SU866972
- Civil parish: Hughenden
- Unitary authority: Buckinghamshire
- Ceremonial county: Buckinghamshire
- Region: South East
- Country: England
- Sovereign state: United Kingdom
- Post town: HIGH WYCOMBE
- Postcode district: HP14, HP15
- Dialling code: 01494
- Police: Thames Valley
- Fire: Buckinghamshire
- Ambulance: South Central
- UK Parliament: Aylesbury

Hughenden Valley (formerly called Hughenden or Hitchendon) is an extensive village and civil parish in Buckinghamshire, England, just to the north of High Wycombe. The civil parish is still named Hughenden as of 2024. It is almost 8,000 acres (32 km^{2}) in size, divided mainly between arable and wooded land. It is situated 3 miles (4.8 km) north of central Wycombe, 12.5 miles (20.1 km) south of the county town of Aylesbury and some 35 miles (56 km) west-northwest of London.

== History ==
Hughenden parish was first mentioned in the Domesday Book of 1086 and was called Huchedene, or Hugh's Valley in modern English. There are some that argue the original name refers to the Anglo Saxon man's name Huhha rather than the French Hugh. At the time of the Domesday Book, the village was in the extensive estates of Odo, Bishop of Bayeux, who was the half brother of William the Conqueror.

There were many ancient manors within the parish border, and in addition to Odo, Henry I, Henry VIII and Simon de Montfort have all at one time owned property in the parish.

Benjamin Disraeli (later Earl of Beaconsfield) lived at Hughenden Manor, a Georgian mansion, altered by the Disraelis when they purchased it in 1848. The manor sits on the brow of the hill to the west of the main road that links Hughenden to High Wycombe. The Earl, who died in 1881 was buried in a vault beneath the nearby Church of St Michael and All Angels, accessed from the churchyard. The church also contains a memorial to the Earl erected by Queen Victoria: the only instance a reigning monarch has ever erected a memorial to a subject. The Manor House was given to the National Trust in 1947, and the trust also own woodland around here as well.

The Grade II* listed Disraeli Monument stands on Tinker's Hill in the Hughenden Valley, in memory of the writer and scholar Isaac D'Israeli.

== Sport and recreation ==
Hughenden has a King George's Field in memorial to King George V, and there is a village hall here where local groups meet.

== Amenities and businesses ==
- A pub called The Harrow at the north end of the village.
- Deeter Electronics Ltd, which produces specialist electronics, on the site of the former petrol station and BMW garage.
- A builder's yard near the south end of the village, where there is also a car garage called Hughenden Autos
- A medical practice on the corner of the junction going to Great Kingshill.
- A Village Hall
- A community-run shop adjacent to the Village Hall, which opened in May 2009.
- The former post office is now a private residence.

== Schools ==
The village proper has one school – Hughenden Primary School which recently moved from being just a first school, (years reception to 2), but is now taking years reception to year 6. Children can also go to Great Kingshill Combined School which is a Church of England school and so has links with the local church.

== Hamlets ==
Hamlets in Hughenden parish include:

- Great Kingshill
- Naphill
- Walters Ash
- Widmer End
- Four Ashes
- Cryers Hill
