= Pipers Corner School =

Location
- Great Kingshill; High Wycombe, Buckinghamshire, HP15 6LP; England; 51.66979°N 0.74651°W

Information
- Type: Private day
- Motto: They Will Rise Like Eagles
- Religious affiliation: Church of England
- Established: 1930
- Founder: Jessie Cross
- Local authority: Buckinghamshire
- Department for Education URN: 110545 Tables
- Headmistress: Helen Ness-Gifford
- Gender: Girls
- Age: 4 to 18
- Enrolment: 592~
- Houses: Hampden, Mandeville, Milton and Penn
- Website: piperscorner.co.uk

Pipers Corner School is a private day school for girls in Great Kingshill, Buckinghamshire, England. There are 605 pupils aged from 4 to 18 years. The school is an educational charitable trust administered by a board of governors. There are three age groups: pre-prep for 4 to 7 years old; prep for 7–11; and senior for 11–18.

== History ==
The school was first established in 1930 by Miss Jessie Cross as the Old Vicarage School, Richmond. It moved to Prestwood Lodge, Buckinghamshire during The Blitz on London in the Second World War and officially opened at the present site on 23 March 1946, after the purchase of the Pipers Corner property in July 1945.

The school started with 11 girls in Grove Park in Chiswick in 1930, moving to Richmond Hill in 1931 and splitting between two sites in 1935, the second being Prestwood in Buckinghamshire. The school finally settled in its current site in the winter of 1945. By 1955 there were 162 girls attending the school.

The current Headmistress is Helen Ness-Gifford.

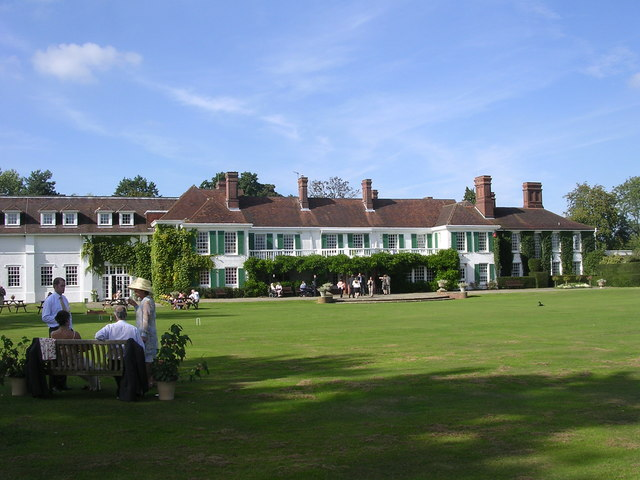
Pipers Corner

== Notable alumni ==
- Ana Mulvoy-Ten, Actress
- E. L. James, Author
- Kelly Osbourne
- Harley Bird, Actress
