= Little Kingshill =

Village in Buckinghamshire, England

Coordinates: 51.6824°N 0.7026°W

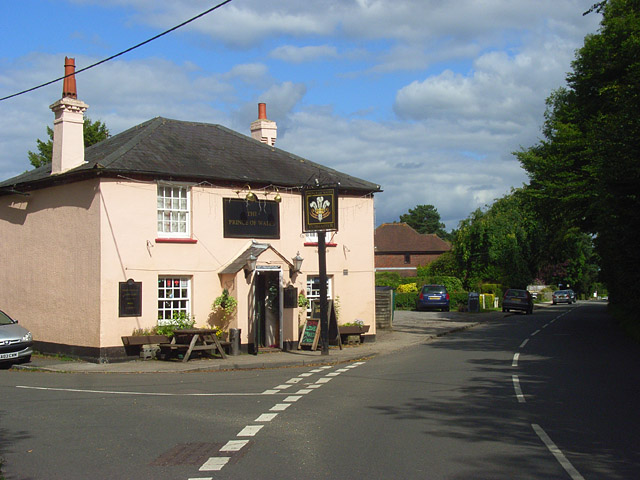
- The Prince of Wales, Little Kingshill, 2008

- Location within Buckinghamshire
- OS grid reference: SU877979
- Civil parish: Little Missenden
- Unitary authority: Buckinghamshire
- Ceremonial county: Buckinghamshire
- Region: South East
- Country: England
- Sovereign state: United Kingdom
- Post town: GREAT MISSENDEN
- Postcode district: HP16
- Dialling code: 01494
- Police: Thames Valley
- Fire: Buckinghamshire
- Ambulance: South Central
- UK Parliament: Mid Buckinghamshire

Little Kingshill is a small Chilterns village in the parish of Little Missenden in Buckinghamshire, England, with the closest amenities being in its post town of Great Missenden. It is approximately five miles west of Amersham, about four and a half miles north west of High Wycombe and just under two miles south of Great Missenden, with its fast train to London Marylebone.

The hamlet name 'Kingshill' means a hill in possession of the king, which local folklore suggests was King John; there is certainly evidence of King John granting the manor at Kingshill to Hugh de Gournay in 1213, although this same document states that the land was previously possessed by Geoffrey fitzPeter. The affix 'Little' was added later to differentiate between the hamlet and neighbouring village Great Kingshill, although the two are in separate parishes and, indeed, separate districts, with Little Kingshill, in effect, an extension of Great Missenden.

Little Kingshill has one pub: The Full Moon in Hare Lane. The main road, Windsor Lane, is home to the playing fields, the playground, the Baptist church, which is home to a coffee shop, and the village school. This Chiltern village is surrounded by Metropolitan Green Belt countryside.

Little Kingshill has its own primary school with a nursery, catering for children from 3–11 years. It is controlled by Buckinghamshire County Council.
