= Joint Force Air Component Headquarters =

U.K. military unit

- Unit badge
- Country: United Kingdom
- Branch: Royal Air Force
- Type: Deployable headquarters
- Role: Aerial warfare command and control
- Part of: No. 11 Group
- Home station: RAF High Wycombe, Buckinghamshire

Insignia
- Abbreviation: JFACHQ

The Joint Force Air Component Headquarters (JFACHQ) is the United Kingdom's deployable air command and control unit. The JFACHQ is run by the Royal Air Force with representation from the other services.

The JFACHQ has members from the operations and operations support branches of the RAF to both plan and execute the air war as well as support the deployed air components from A1 to A9.

The unit is based at RAF High Wycombe. It can deploy worldwide at short notice to run an air campaign.

The constituent parts of the JFAC are broken down according to the Continental staff system:

- A1 – PANDA (Personnel and administration)
- A2 – RAF Intelligence
- A3 – Air operations (both plans and current operations)
- A4 – Air logistics
- A5 – Air strategy and contingency planning
- A6 – Air CIS (Communication and Information Systems)
- A7 – Air training
- A8 – Finance and budgets
- A9 – POLAD (Political advice) and LEGAD (Legal adviser)
