= Ground sample distance =

Distance between pixel centers in remote sensing

In remote sensing, ground sample distance (GSD) in a digital photo of the ground from air or space is the distance between pixel centers measured on the ground. For example, in an image with a one-meter GSD, adjacent pixels image locations are 1 meter apart on the ground. GSD is a measure of one limitation to spatial resolution or image resolution, that is, the limitation due to sampling.

GSD is also referred to as ground-projected sample interval (GSI) and is related to the ground-projected instantaneous field of view (GIFOV).

== Formulas ==
The GSD can be calculated using the geometry of the imaging setup.

=== General case (oblique or slant view) ===
In the general case where the sensor may be imaging the ground at an oblique angle (i.e., not looking directly down), the GSD is given by:

$\mathrm{GSD} = \frac{R_S \times p}{f \times \cos(\theta)}$

Where:

- $\mathrm{GSD}$ is the ground sample distance, e.g., in cm/px;
- $R_S = \sqrt{d^2 + h^2}$ is the slant range from the sensor to the point on the ground, e.g., in meters:
  - $d$ is the horizontal distance (or offset) from nadir, e.g., in meters;
  - $h$ is the height above ground level (AGL) of the sensor, e.g., in meters.
- $p = P \div N$ is the physical pixel size of the sensor, e.g., in micrometers:
  - $P$ is the physical width or height of the sensor, e.g., in millimeters;
  - $N$ is the number of total pixels in the same dimension as $P$.
- $f$ is the focal length of the camera lens, e.g., in millimeters;
- $\theta = \arctan \left( d \div h \right)$ is the slant angle from nadir (which would correspond to 0°), e.g., in degrees.

The cosine of $\theta$ accounts for the oblique viewing angle, which increases the effective ground footprint of each pixel.

=== Nadir case (look-down view) ===
In the special case of a nadir view, i.e., when the sensor is looking directly downward, the formula is simplified since $d = 0$. Thus, $R_S = h$ and $\theta = 0$, the cosine of which is 1. Therefore, the formula becomes:

$\mathrm{GSD} = \frac{h \times p}{f}$

Where all variables are defined as above.

=== Planar components derivative formula ===
Calculator
$d$	1000 m
$h$	2000 m
$p$	2.9 μm
$f$	600 mm
$\mathrm{GSD}$	1.20833 cm/px

If the slant range $R_S$ and slant angle $\theta$ are to be derived from the horizontal and vertical components $d$ and $h$ thereof, after simplification, the formula becomes:

$\mathrm{GSD} = \frac{d^2+h^2}{h} \times \frac{p}{f}$

Where all variables are defined as above.

=== Optimal off-nadir angle for maximal distance ===
Calculator
$\mathrm{GSD_{max}}$	5 cm
$p$	2.9 μm
$f$	600 mm
$d = h \approx$	5172 m

To maximize the horizontal imaging distance ($d$) for a given optical system while adhering to a specified maximum ground sample distance ($\mathrm{GSD_{max}}$) constraint, the optimal imaging geometry is achieved at a 45° off-nadir angle. This corresponds to a height above ground level ($h$) equal to the horizontal distance between the target point ($d$) and the sensor.

This configuration is useful for planning aerial or satellite imaging operations, for which both resolution and maximum coverable area are critical aspects. The maximum attainable $d$ under resolution constraint can be calculated as follows:

$d = h = \frac{\mathrm{GSD_{max}}}{2} \times \frac{f}{p}$

Where $\mathrm{GSD_{max}}$ is the desired maximum ground sample distance, and all other variables are defined as above.

Within this constraint, reducing the horizontal distance ($d$) without lowering the height ($h$) decreases the off-nadir angle and shifts the imaging closer to nadir, thereby improving the ground sample distance. Conversely, decreasing $h$ while keeping $d$ constant increases the off-nadir angle beyond 45°, which degrades the GSD. The 45° configuration provides the widest possible coverage while maintaining the specified GSD limit.

== See also ==
- Geographic distance
