= Four Ashes, Buckinghamshire =

Hamlet in Buckinghamshire, England, United Kingdom

Coordinates: 51.654°N 0.734°W

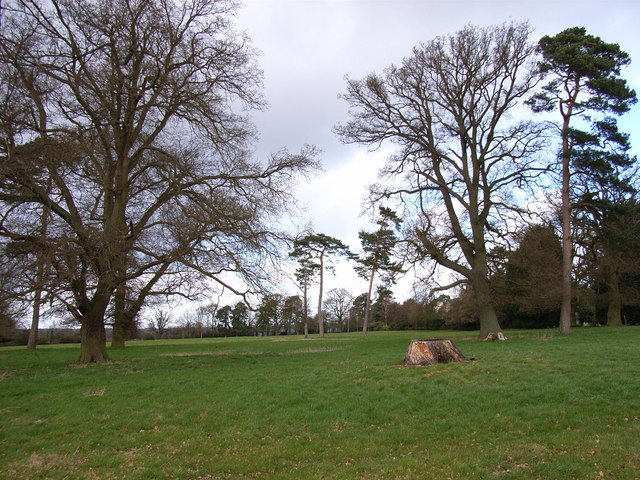
Parkland at Four Ashes, 2006

Four Ashes is a hamlet in the parish of Hughenden, in Buckinghamshire, England.

It was the site of Rockhalls manor house - home to the medieval Wellesbourne family and later home to the Widmer family. A farm on the site still bears the Rockhalls name and parts of the old manorial moat are visible.

Local legend tells of a dragon that lived at Four Ashes and whose image was painted onto the walls of the old manor house. Also, a dell known as "Hags Pit" on the edge of the hamlet is alleged to have been connected to witchcraft.
