= Naphill =

Village in Buckinghamshire, England

Coordinates: 51.664466°N 0.774488°W

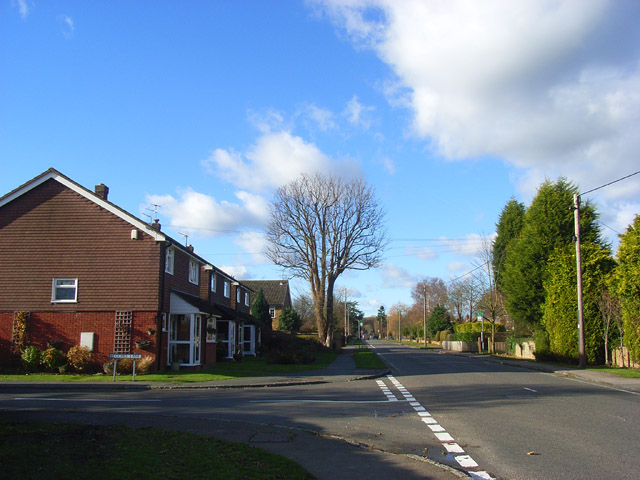
- Main Road, Naphill, the junction with Louches Lane

- Location within Buckinghamshire
- OS grid reference: SU847969
- Civil parish: Hughenden
- Unitary authority: Buckinghamshire
- Ceremonial county: Buckinghamshire
- Region: South East
- Country: England
- Sovereign state: United Kingdom
- Post town: High Wycombe
- Postcode district: HP14
- Dialling code: 01494
- Police: Thames Valley
- Fire: Buckinghamshire
- Ambulance: South Central
- UK Parliament: Mid Buckinghamshire

Naphill /ˈnæphɪl/ is a village in the parish of Hughenden Valley, in Buckinghamshire, England. It is north-west of Hughenden, on the ridge of one of the Chiltern Hills, and is adjacent to the village of Walter's Ash.

The origin of its name is obscure. It is sometimes thought that people napped flints here, but this is disputed.

Naphill is a mainly linear settlement, with nearly all the houses built on side-roads branching off Main Road, which is just over 1 mile (1.6 km) long.

Naphill borders the ancient parishes of Bradenham, North Dean, and West Wycombe. Whilst a village in its own right, it is part of the Parish of Hughenden, and is located around the former border between two ancient British tribes, the Catuvellauni and the Atrebates. It is close to the ancient feature Grimm's Ditch.

Walter's Ash in Naphill is the location of RAF Strike Command, which contains a nuclear bunker built on National Trust land in 1983–1985. This lies near the wartime Bomber Command bunker built in the 1930s. There was a peace camp during the time of the construction of the nuclear bunker, and during that time two copies of the magazine The Angry Pacifist were produced.

== Naphill Common ==
Naphill Common takes up a large part of Naphill, running the whole length of the village's west side. It is larger and more wooded than its neighbour, Downley Common. The Common contains evidence of an industrial background, including medieval iron smelting. Pieces of iron slag have been found in the area, which was once semi-enclosed. Also pieces of pottery dated to the 12th to 15th centuries have been found turned up by rabbits.

Naphill Common is home to several very large beech and oak trees. One beech tree has grown on a medieval enclosure, the purposes of which enclosure is unknown because only three of its sides are visible. Most of the iron kilns and pottery are to be found in this part of Naphill. Originally, Naphill Common was more open, with large trees separated by grass-covered open ground, rather than the dense wood that has grown up around it.

Naphill Common is a Site of Special Scientific Interest.
