= Marmon-Herrington armoured car =

Marmon–Herrington armoured car
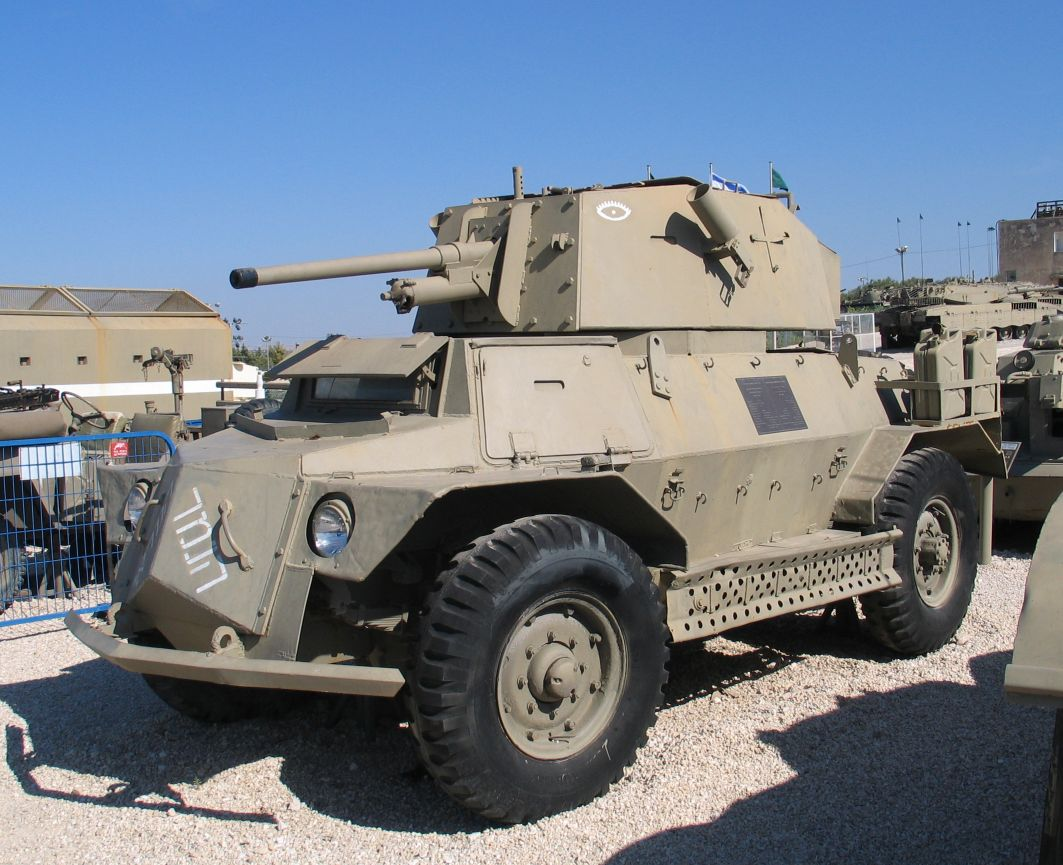
- Marmon–Herrington Mk IVF ha-Namer ha-Norai (The Terrible Tiger) in Yad La-Shiryon museum, Israel.
- Type: Armoured car
- Place of origin: South Africa

Service history
- In service: 1940–1990s
- Used by: See operators
- Wars: World War II; Indonesian National Revolution; Turkish invasion of Cyprus; Rhodesian Bush War; 1948 Arab–Israeli War

Production history
- Designed: 1938–1943
- Manufacturer: Ford Canada; Marmon–Herrington; Iron & Steel Industrial Corporation (ISCOR); Dorman Long company among others
- Produced: 1940–1944
- No. built: 5,746

Specifications (Mk IV / Mk IVF)
- Mass: 6.4 t (14,000 lb)
- Length: 15 ft (4.57 m)
- Width: 6 ft (1.83 m)
- Height: 7 ft (2.13 m)
- Crew: 3 - 4
- Armour: up to 20 mm
- Main armament: QF 2 pounder gun
- Secondary armament: 1 or 2 x 7.62 mm M1919 Browning machine gun
- Engine: Ford V-8 petrol 95 horsepower (71 kW)
- Power/weight: 14.2 hp/tonne
- Drive: 4×4
- Suspension: Wheeled
- Operational range: 200 miles (322 km)
- Maximum speed: 50 mph (80 km/h)

The Marmon–Herrington armoured car was a series of armoured vehicles that were produced in South Africa and adopted by the British Army during World War II. They were also issued to RAF armoured car companies, which seem never to have used them in action, making greater use of Rolls-Royce armoured cars and other types.

== History ==
In 1938 the South African authorities began funding development of a new armoured car for the Union Defence Force. The outbreak of World War II led to a vehicle based on a Ford 3-ton truck chassis. As South Africa then lacked a developed automotive industry, many components of the vehicle had to be imported. Chassis components were purchased from Ford Canada and fitted with a four-wheel drive train produced by the American company Marmon–Herrington (hence the designation). The armament was UK-made (with the exception of the U.S.-made M1919 Browning machine gun), and armour plates were produced by the South African Iron & Steel Industrial Corporation (ISCOR). Final assembly was done by the local branch of the Dorman Long company among others.

The first version, the "South African Reconnaissance Vehicle" Mk I, entered service in 1940. It was a long wheelbase four-wheeled chassis with drive to only one axle. It was armed with two Vickers machine guns: one in a cylindrical turret and the other in the left side of the hull. There were two large access doors in the rear. It saw a brief action against the Italian forces in the Western Desert and was thereafter relegated to training use.

The Mk II had a shorter wheelbase than the Mark I, and had four wheel drive by using a kit from Marmon–Herrington that offered a front-driven axle. It was known in British service as armoured car, Marmon–Herrington Mk II. The Mark I continued in production (until the end of 1940) while supply of parts from the United States was resolved. Mark II "Middle East Model" denoted the vehicles serving with British forces in the North African campaign. This variant was fitted with a Boys anti-tank rifle and a single coaxial Bren light machine gun. A second model intended for sub-Saharan deployments was armed with twin Vickers machine guns.

Marmon–Herringtons saw extensive combat in North Africa, being the only armoured car available to Commonwealth divisions in sufficient numbers, and had a reputation as a dependable, if somewhat light and undergunned, vehicle. As an unusual quantity of German, Vichy French, and Italian weaponry was captured during desert engagements, often Allied troops modified their Mk IIs by mounting Breda Model 35, Breda Meccanica Bresciana, 3.7 cm Pak 36 and 2.8 cm sPzB 41 anti-tank guns. As the turret made no provision for larger armament, it was simply removed and crew members depended on gun shields for protection. Besides those cars utilised for reconnaissance, others were adopted for use as mobile command posts, military ambulances, recovery vehicles, and Royal Air Force liaison.

The Mark III was created with thicker armour plate on a compact body, which included a shorter wheelbase. More than 2,000 Mark IIIs were exported before production ceased in mid-1942. Some were dispatched to the Royal Netherlands East Indies Army and arrived during the East Indies Campaign. Local crews adopted the earlier South African configuration of twin Vickers machine guns; in Dutch service these were designated Zuid-Afrikaanse pantserautos and continued to serve as late as the Indonesian National Revolution. A number were captured by invading Japanese forces in March 1942.

In March 1943 a completely redesigned Mk IV/Mk IVF entered production. It was a monocoque with rear-mounted engine and a turret-mounted 2-pounder with a coaxial .30 in (7.62 mm) Browning machine gun as the standard armament. Due to the inability of Marmon–Herrington to supply sufficient drivetrains, the Mk IVF used a Ford Canada drive train. Further versions were designed but never got beyond the prototype stage. By that time (late 1943), the North African Campaign had ended, the mountainous geography of the Italian campaign did not suit armoured cars, and the British and Commonwealth armies were receiving enough armoured cars from other sources.

In total, 5,746 Marmon–Herrington armoured cars were built. About 4,500 were used by South African units, while others were employed by British, Indian, New Zealand, Greek, Free French, Polish, Dutch East Indies, and Belgian forces. After World War II, a few were given to the Trans-Jordan and saw combat with the Arab Legion in the 1948 Arab-Israeli War. The Mk IVF saw combat as late as July–August 1974, during the Turkish invasion of Cyprus, when it was used by the Cypriot National Guard. The Greek army used Marmon–Herringtons in the islands of the Aegean well into the 1990s, in mechanized infantry battalions of special composition, alongside Jeeps, M-113s, and Leonidas AFVs. They were finally phased out of service with the introduction of VBL AFV, six decades after their introduction.

== Variants ==
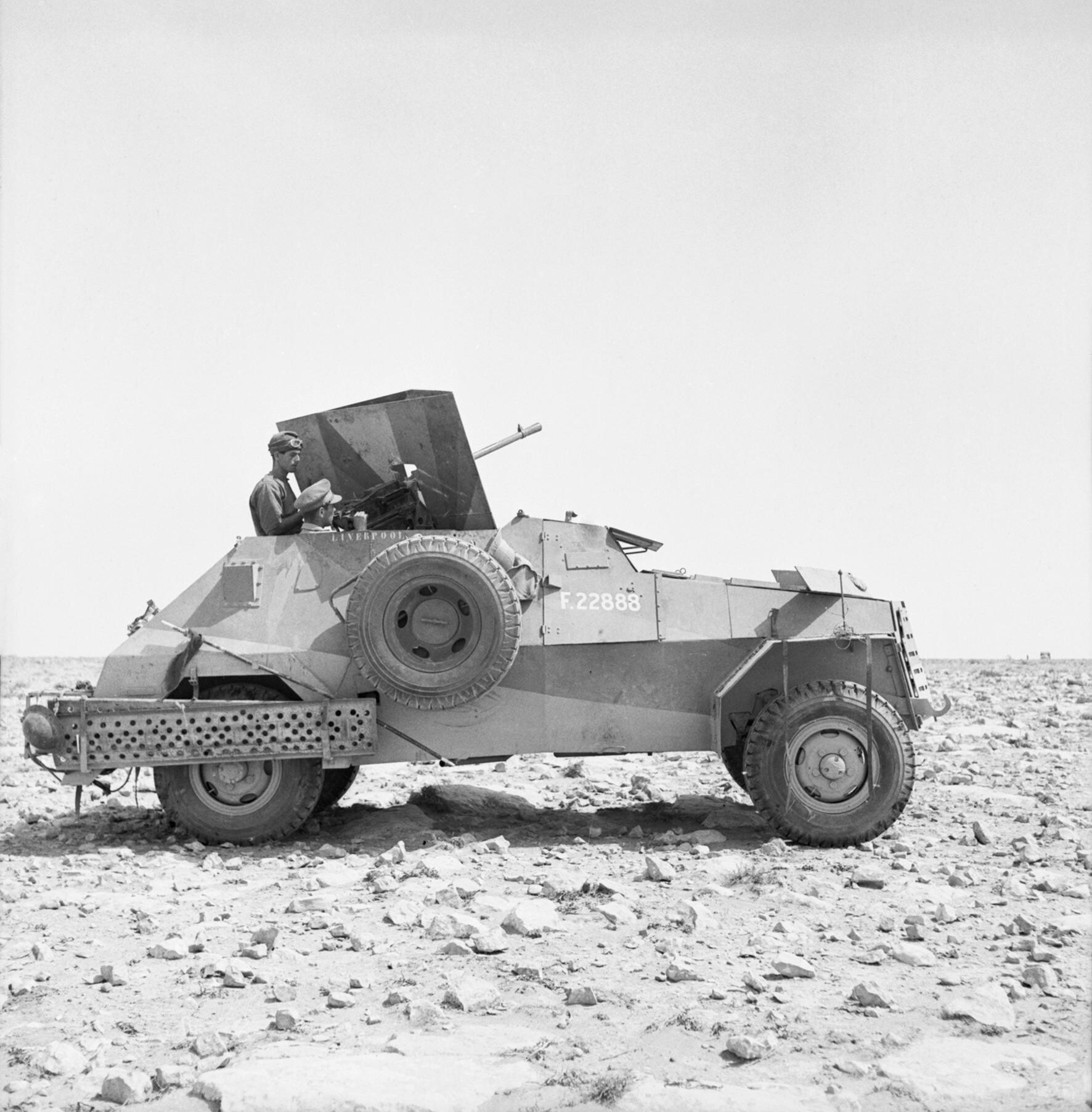
Mk II with an Italian Breda 20 mm gun near Tobruk, 8 May 1941.

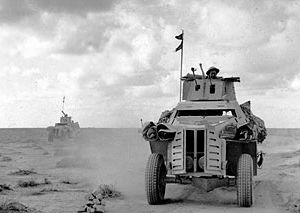
Marmon–Herrington armoured cars on patrol in the Western Desert, 28 November 1941.

- Mk I (1940) – two wheel drive only, armed with two .303 in (7.7 mm) Vickers machine guns, one in a cylindrical turret, other in the left rear of the hull. 113 units built.
- Mk II (1941) – lengthened chassis, all-wheel drive. Early vehicles carried the same armament as Mk I. Late production vehicles received an octagonal turret with Boys anti-tank rifle and Bren MG. There were pintle mountings for Vickers MG and Bren MG (the latter was rarely carried). Hull was riveted in early vehicles and welded in late production ones. 887 units built.
- Mk III (1941) – similar to late production Mk II, with a slightly shorter wheelbase. Late production vehicles had single rear door, no radiator grille and no headlight covers. 2,630 units built.
  - Mk IIIA – turret replaced by a ring mount for two .303 in (7.7 mm) Vickers K machine guns protected by a steel skirt. The A denoted a modification of the armament.
- Mk IV (1943): The Mark IV was a completely redesigned vehicle, though still based on the same engine and Marmon–Herrington components. The rear-mounted engine and the transmission were bolted directly to the welded hull. Armour protection was still thin at only 12 mm to the front and 6 mm thick elsewhere. A QF 2 pounder anti-tank gun was mounted in a two-man turret. The gun used an artillery mounting as the turret was not up to the stress of a tank mantlet mounting. Late production vehicles had a coaxial Browning MG. An anti-aircraft Vickers or Browning MG was mounted on the turret roof. Over 2,000 units built. After the war many Jordanian examples had the turret lengthened at the front and fitted with a 6 pounder (57mm) gun, while others had the turret removed and a 3.7 in (94 mm) mountain howitzer fitted in its place.
  - Mk IVF (1943) – due to a difficulty in obtaining the Marmon–Herrington kit, a version very similar to the Mk IV but based on the Canadian Ford F60L four-wheel-drive 3-ton truck chassis was built to fulfill a British order of 1,200 vehicles.
- South African heavy armoured car Mark V (1942)

The Mark V was one of four 8-wheeled designs (Note: The others were in the United States and Canada) built as a response to reports of the German 8-wheeled armoured cars (Schwerer Panzerspähwagen). Power was from two Albion 6-cylinder engines driving only the two middle axles. The prototype had poor performance in desert conditions and was rebuilt with both engines at the rear. Although well-armoured, it was heavy at 16 tons and performance still lacked, so the project was stopped. A very large vehicle armed with the QF 2 pounder gun and armoured side skirts; only the one prototype was built.

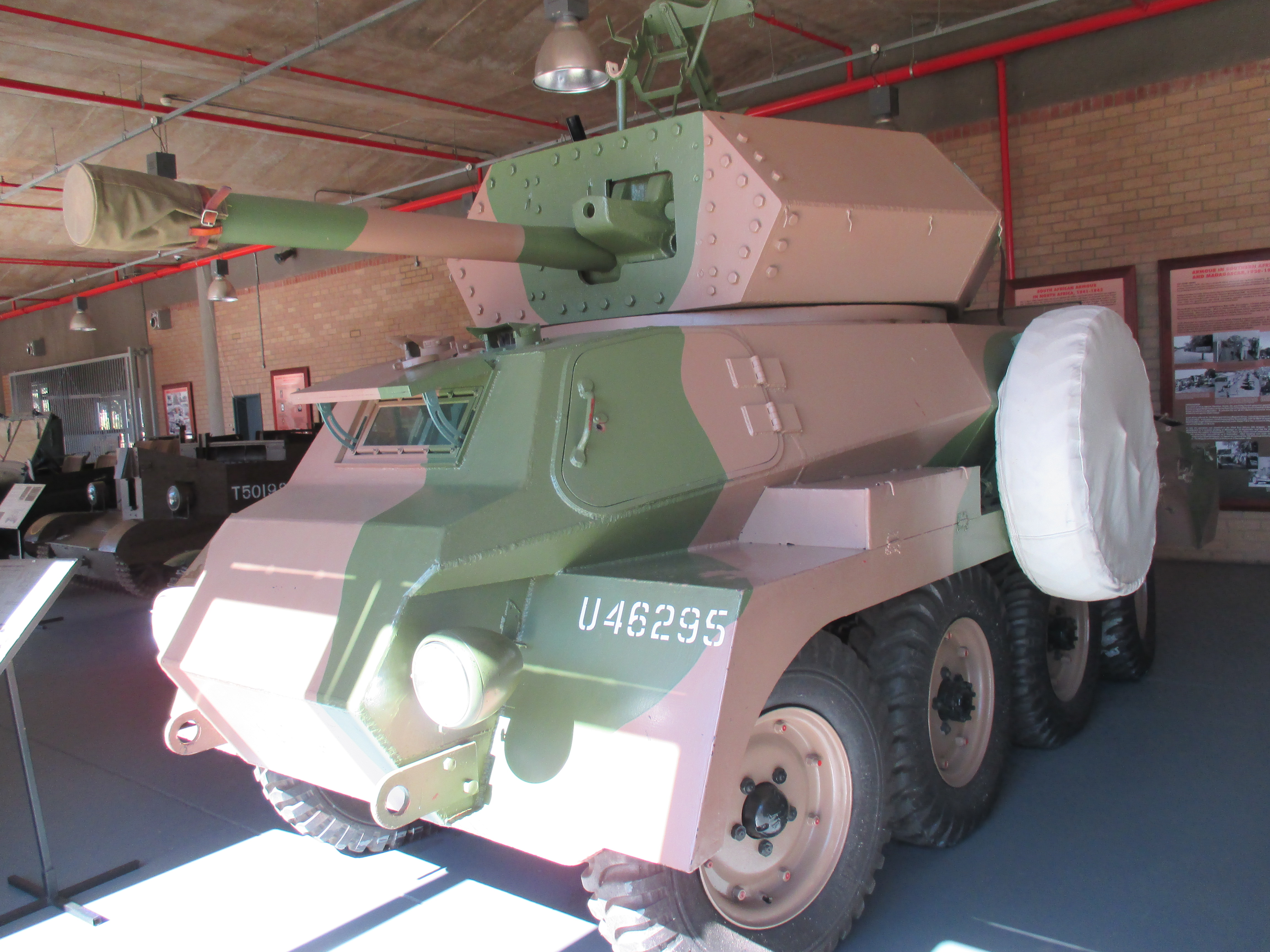
Mk VI prototype in the South African National Museum of Military History.

- Mk VI (1943)

The Mark VI was a return to the 8-wheeled design. Powered by two Mercury V8 engines with an eight-wheel drive steered on the front and rear wheels. Two prototypes were built, one with a 2-pounder and other with a 6-pounder gun in an open-topped three-man turret with electric-powered traverse, protected by 10 to 30 mm of sloped armour. Additional armament consisted of two or three machine guns. The two-pounder equipped version was sent to the UK for assessment, the transmission proved unreliable suffering several axle failures. The 2-pdr is now in the Bovington Tank Museum, the other in South Africa.

- Mk VII

An improved version of the Mk IIIA, the project was stopped after prototypes as it was only armed with a Vickers machine gun.

- Mk VIII

Similar to the Mk III but with a 2-pounder gun in a bigger turret. The project was stopped in 1943 as requirements had already moved on to larger weapons such as the 6 pounder gun.

== Operators ==
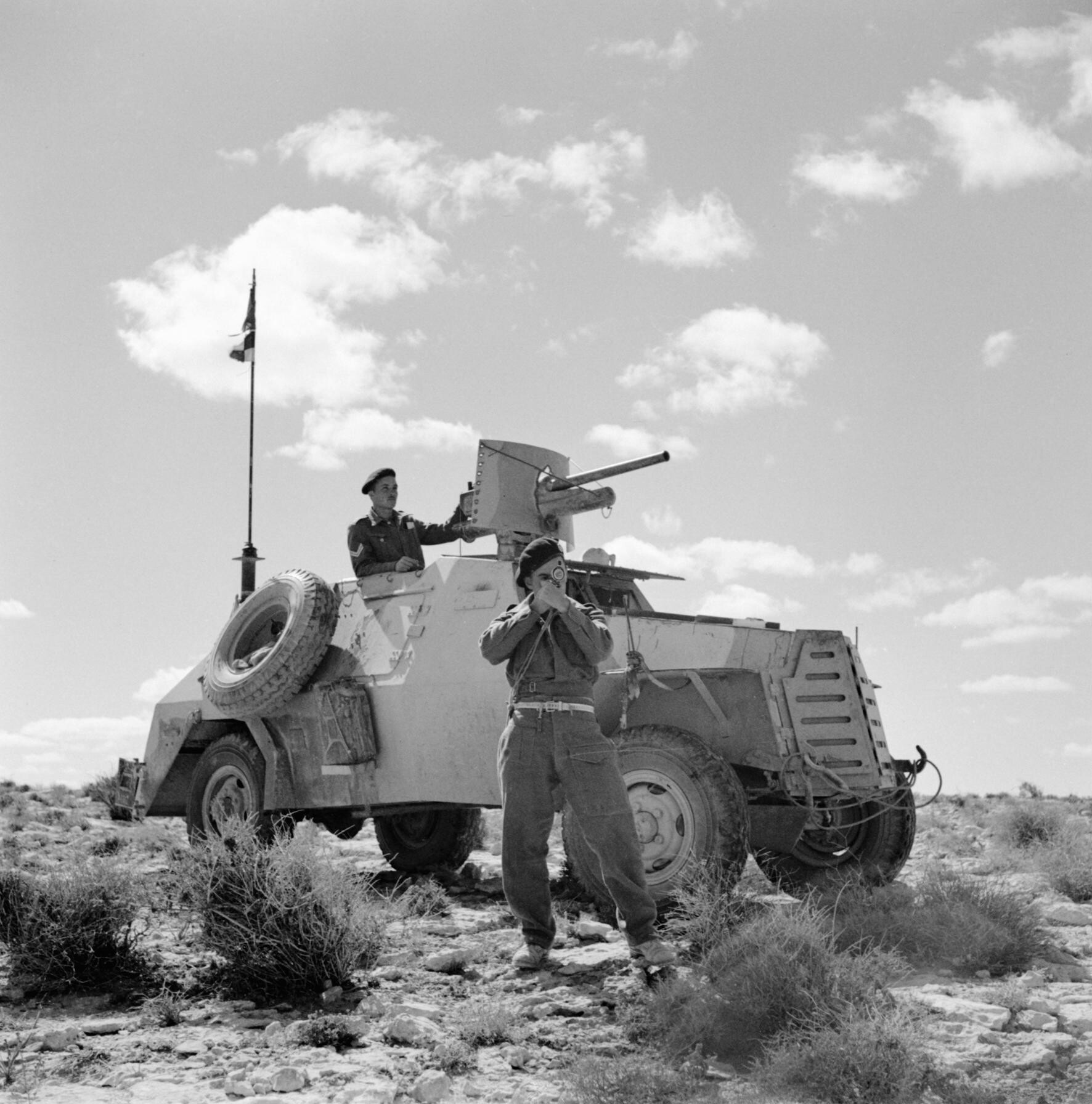
South African Marmon–Herrington

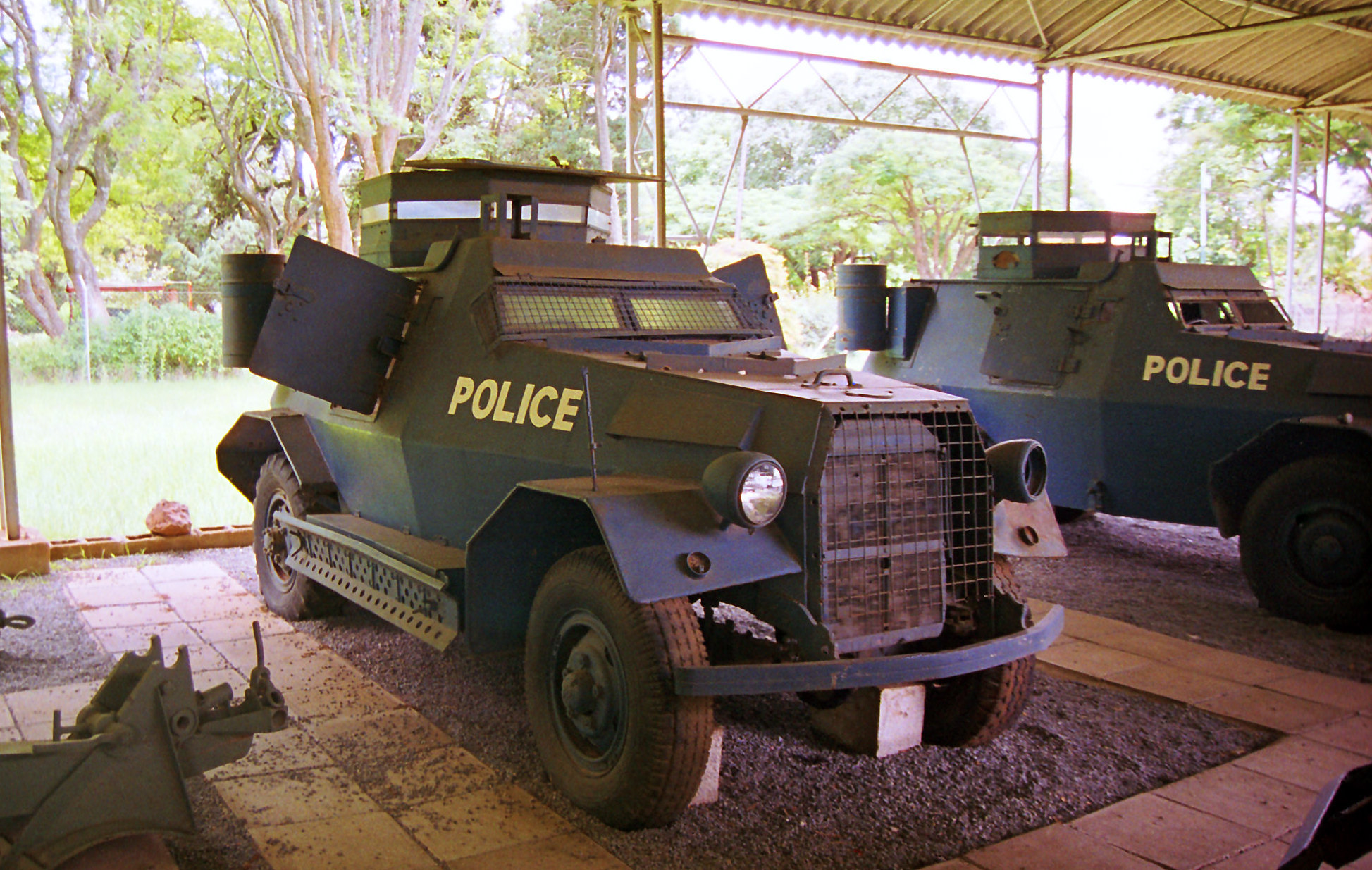
BSAP Marmon–Herringtons in the Zimbabwe Military Museum, Gweru.

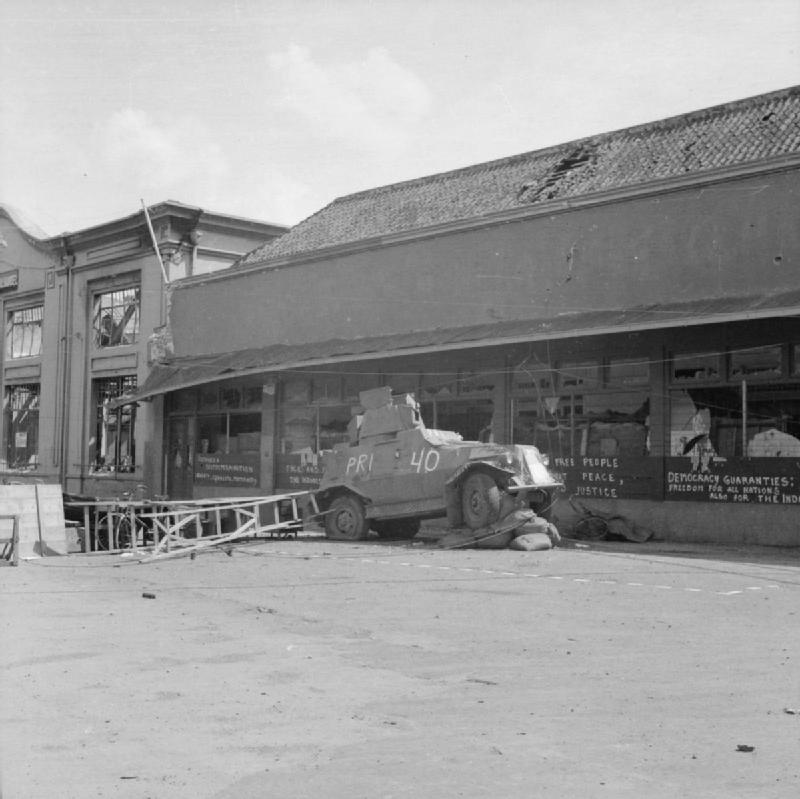
A wrecked Indonesian Marmon–Herrington Mk III in Surabaya, circa 1945

- Cyprus – Cypriot National Guard: Deployed against invading Turkish troops in 1974.
- Egypt
- France – Free French Forces: Mk III. Some modified to carry the 25 mm Hotchkiss anti-tank gun.
- Greece – Hellenic Army:
- (British Raj) British India – British Indian Army: Mark III.
- Indonesia – People's Security Forces and Special Police Troops: Mk III. Captured from Imperial Japanese Army stocks. Operated during Indonesian National Revolution, especially in Battle of Surabaya.
- Kingdom of Italy – Royal Italian Army: Operated captured vehicles during the North African Campaign.
- Empire of Japan – Imperial Japanese Army: Captured during the Malayan and East Indies campaigns. Some supplied to the Indian National Army.
- Kenya Colony – Kenyan Armoured Car Regiment
- Dutch East Indies – Royal Netherlands East Indies Army: Mark III.
- Poland – 2nd Armoured Brigade: Mark II.
- Rhodesia – British South Africa Police: MK III. Retired in 1972.
- South Africa – South African Armoured Corps
- Syria – Syrian Army: Mark IVF.
- (Jordan) Transjordan – Arab Legion: Mark IV.
- United Kingdom – 1st King's Dragoon Guards: 80 in service during the Siege of Tobruk.

== See also ==
- Dorman Long
- Humber armoured car
- Eland Mk7

== Bibliography ==
- Forty, George (1996). World War Two Armoured Fighting Vehicles and Self-Propelled Artillery, Osprey Publishing, ISBN 1-85532-582-9.
- Steve Camp & Helmoed-Römer Heitman, Surviving the Ride – A Pictorial History of South African-Manufactured Armoured Vehicles, 30 Degrees South Publishers, Johannesburg (South Africa) 2014. ISBN 978-1-928211-17-4 –
- Fletcher, David (1989a). The Great Tank Scandal: British Armour in the Second World War - Part 1. HMSO. ISBN 978-0-11-290460-1.
- Equipment Used By the Armoured Car Regiments at btinternet.com
- South African Armor at Mailer.fsu.edu
- Warwheels.net: Mk I, Mk II, Mk III, Mk IV, Mk VI
- Armored Car: The Wheeled Fighting Vehicle Journal No. 8 pdf
- Spoelstra, Hanno. "Armoured Cars with Marmon-Herrington All-Wheel Drive Conversion Kits". Marmon-Herrington Military Vehicles.
- Marmon-Herrington Armoured Car at WWII vehicles
