= Ernest Norton (RAF officer) =

British air officer (1893–1966)

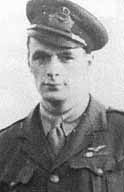
- A portrait of Ernest William Norton
- Born: 14 May 1893; Dolguan, Newtown, Montgomeryshire, Wales
- Died: 23 May 1966 (aged 73); Weston-super-Mare, Somerset, England
- Military career
- Allegiance: United Kingdom
- Branch: British Army; Royal Navy; Royal Air Force
- Service years: 1914–1944
- Rank: Air Commodore
- Commands: No. 5 Flying Training School (1932–37); RAF Upavon (1930–32); No. 58 Squadron RAF (1927–28, 1929–30); RAF Worthy Down (1929); No. 70 Squadron RAF (1925–26); No. 6 Armoured Car Company (1924–25); No. 65 Wing RAF (1918–19); No. 204 Squadron RAF (1918); No. 9 Squadron RNAS (1917–18); No. 12 Squadron RNAS (1917)
- Conflicts: First World War; Second World War
- Awards: Distinguished Service Cross; Officer of the Order of the Crown (Belgium); Croix de guerre (Belgium); Croix de guerre (France)

Air Commodore Ernest William Norton, DSC (14 May 1893 – 23 May 1966) was a British air officer of the Royal Air Force (RAF), who began his military career as a flying ace of the First World War credited with nine aerial victories. He rose through the ranks in a mixture of domestic and foreign assignments during the interwar period until he was appointed Air Officer-in-Charge at RAF Headquarters in Singapore on 28 December 1937. By 7 September 1941, he was serving as an air commodore for RAF Fighter Command in Britain. He retired from the RAF on 24 February 1944.

== Early life and background ==
Norton was born in Dolguan, Newtown, Montgomeryshire, the son of Clement W. Norton. He was educated at Newtown County School, and then worked at a motor establishment in Welshpool.

== First World War ==
On the outbreak of the First World War in August 1914 Norton was mobilized to serve in his Territorial Force regiment, the Montgomeryshire Yeomanry, as a despatch rider. On 25 May 1915 he was commissioned as a probationary flight sub-lieutenant to serve in the Royal Naval Air Service. Following flight training he was granted Royal Aero Club Aviators' Certificate No. 1476 on 29 July after soloing a Maurice Farman biplane at the Central Flying School at Upavon. In September he was confirmed in his rank of flight sub-lieutenant, with seniority from 25 May, and was posted to No. 5 Squadron at Dover, but was soon transferred to "A" Squadron, No. 1 Wing. On 23 January 1916 Norton dropped a 16-pound (7.3 kg) bomb on a U-boat, which had been previously attacked by another aircraft, whilst patrolling off Ostend. In March he was reported as having been injured in the foot, leg, and head during an attack on a Zeppelin. On 28 July he was promoted to flight lieutenant, and at some point afterwards was appointed an acting flight commander. Norton was back in action with No. 1 Wing on 20 October, flying a Nieuport 11 armed with Le Prieur rockets, with which he destroyed an enemy observation balloon at Ostend. He was later awarded the Distinguished Service Cross for this action, which was gazetted on 1 January 1917. His citation read:

Flight Lieutenant Ernest William Norton, RNAS. In recognition of his skill and gallantry in destroying a German kite balloon on 20 October 1916, under severe anti-aircraft fire.

Norton was then transferred to No. 6 Squadron, flying a Nieuport 17bis, serving on the Western Front. On 8 February 1917 he drove down an Aviatik C out of control over Houthulst Forest, and on 27 February he was again appointed an acting flight commander. On 5 April he downed two Albatros D.IIs west of Douai, and on 9 April two Albatros D.IIIs over Cambrai, also surviving a crash landing that burnt out his aircraft. He drove down another D.III east of Honnecourt early on 29 April, and later the same day he accounted for two more D.IIIs over Guise, to bring his victory total to nine.

Norton was promoted to flight commander on 30 June, and as an acting squadron commander was appointed Officer Commanding, No. 12 Squadron on 1 July, then commanded No. 9 Squadron from 15 September, finally receiving promotion to squadron commander on 31 December 1917.

On 1 April 1918, the Royal Naval Air Service and the Army's Royal Flying Corps were merged to form the Royal Air Force, and Norton was transferred to the new force with the rank of major. He commanded No. 204 Squadron RAF from 27 July, then No. 65 Wing from December.

== Inter-war career ==
In the immediate post-war period Norton received several decorations from the Allies. He was made an Officer of the Order of the Crown by Belgium on 8 February 1919, and was awarded the Croix de guerre with Palm by France on 5 April, and received the Belgian Croix de guerre on 15 July. On 1 August 1919 Norton was granted a permanent commission in the RAF, initially with the rank of major, later changed to squadron leader.

On 21 February 1920 Norton was appointed to the staff of the No. 1 School of Technical Training (Boys), and then served as an instructor at the No. 1 Flying Training School from 1 October 1923. He was then sent to Iraq, where he was appointed Officer Commanding, No. 6 Armoured Car Company on 5 December 1924. On 1 July 1925 he was promoted to wing commander, and on 1 December took command of No. 70 Squadron, based at RAF Hinaidi.

The following year Norton returned to England, being transferred to the Home Establishment on 20 August 1926, and was posted temporarily to the Depot at RAF Uxbridge before attending a Staff Course at the Royal Naval College, Greenwich, from 28 September. On completion of his studies Norton was slated for command of No. 7 Squadron based at RAF Worthy Down, but this was later cancelled and instead he was appointed commander of No. 58 Squadron on 28 July 1927. On 30 June 1928, during the ninth annual Royal Air Force Display at Hendon Aerodrome, Norton took part in the "Aerial Parade" led by the prototype Beardmore Inflexible, Boulton & Paul Partridge, Hawker Hawfinch, and Bristol Bulldog aircraft, followed by the Vickers Virginia and Handley Page Hyderabad bombers of No. 7, No. 58 and No. 10 Squadrons, and the Fairey Foxes of No. 12, Hawker Horsleys of No. 11, and the Hawker Woodcocks of No. 3 and No. 17 fighter squadrons. In August Norton led No. 58 Squadron in the 1928 Air Manoeuvres, as part of the attacking "Eastland" forces under Air Vice-Marshal Sir John M. Steel, against the defenders of "Westland" commanded by Air Vice-Marshal Sir Robert Brooke-Popham. The exercises were designed to test unit efficiency, and to improve the co-ordination of air and ground defence systems in organization, tactics, and communications.

On 7 December 1928 Norton was appointed temporary Station Commander of RAF Worthy Down, before returning to command of No. 58 Squadron on 18 April 1929. In the Air Manoeuvres of August 1930 he led No. 58 Squadron as part on the attacking Blue forces, against the defending Red forces. From 18 August 1930 Norton served as Station Commander at RAF Upavon. He was promoted to group captain on 1 July 1932, and left Upavon on 27 July, taking command of No. 5 Flying Training School at RAF Sealand on 5 August.

On 1 January 1937 Norton was promoted to air commodore, and on 15 February was transferred to the headquarters of Coastal Command at Lee-on-the-Solent to serve as Air Officer-in-Charge of Administration. On 28 December Norton was appointed Air Officer-in-Charge of Administration at the headquarters of RAF Far East at Singapore.

== Second World War ==
Norton returned to the United Kingdom to serve as Duty Air Commodore at the Headquarters of Fighter Command from 7 September 1941, and retired from the RAF on 24 February 1944.

== Bibliography ==
- Franks, Norman (2000). Nieuport Aces of World War I. London, UK: Osprey Publishing. ISBN 978-1-85532-961-4.
