= Michael Casano =

Michael Peter Casano
- Born: 7 June 1913; Folkestone, United Kingdom
- Died: 2006 (aged 93)
- Military career
- Allegiance: United Kingdom
- Branch: Royal Air Force
- Rank: Squadron Leader
- Nickname: Cas
- Commands: No. 2 Armoured Car Company RAF
- Conflicts: World War II: Second Battle of El Alamein
- Awards: Military Cross

Michael Peter Casano, MC (7 June 1913 – 2006), was a Squadron Leader in the Royal Air Force during the Second World War.

He is probably best remembered as the leader of the force of armoured cars that took part in the Relief of Habbaniyah, in Iraq in 1941.

== Early life ==
Casano was born on 7 June 1913 at Folkestone and educated at Dover College. He had a brother, Frederick Roderick, known as Rodney, and a sister, Eileen. Having failed the entrance examination to the RAF College, Cranwell he joined the East Kent Regiment but bought himself out to gain a commission in the RAF three years later.

Casano learned to fly in Egypt but a serious accident (leading to a fractured skull) meant that he was posted onto armoured cars, in 1936. RAF armoured cars operating on Internal Security duties in Palestine at this time, alongside the Army armoured cars of the 11th Hussars, during what was then called the Arab Revolt.

== War service ==
On the outbreak of War with Italy, in June 1940, Flight Lieutenant Casano was serving with No. 2 Armoured Car Company RAF at Amman in the Transjordan. In September of that year, the Army requested assistance for its hard-pressed armoured reconnaissance regiment, whose small force of armoured cars had to cover the vastness of the Western Desert almost single-handed. Flt Lt Casano took two Sections of 2 ACC, of six cars each, to Egypt, to help the Army in formation reconnaissance duties, the traditional cavalry screen, patrolling the border with the large Italian force in Libya. The Army regiment was the old colleagues the 11th Hussars and the RAF cars were soon incorporated, as 'D' Sqn., with Casano as Squadron Commander. The RAF unit took part in the great Battle of Bardia, in December 1940, when the daring of a smaller British Empire force blocked the hesitant advance into Egypt. The Commonwealth forces then seized the initiative and pushed the enemy back as far as El Agheila, in the next few weeks, with D Sqn. acting as flank protection on the Desert flank. In February 1941, after 5 months of very hard, but very successful campaigning, the RAF vehicles were released, to return to Amman for rest and refit. Losses were just 5 wounded or otherwise injured. The vehicles were elderly Rolls-Royce armoured car bodies, refurbished on a rather less exalted Fordson, but durable, truck chassis. After this brilliant baptism of fire, Casano was soon promoted and given command of the whole Company.

It was with No.2 ACC that Casano cemented his reputation a couple of months later. The company was by then back in Egypt, on Ground Defence duties. protecting the airfields of the Desert Air Force, when they were called to help relieve their colleagues of No.1 Armoured Car Company RAF at RAF Habbaniya in Iraq. During the fighting over the Fallujah Plain near Baghdad in the summer of 1941, Casano won his MC. The citation reads:

"The successes of the 'HAB' force, both in Iraq and Syria, were largely due to this officer; he operated virtually alone, and his zeal and devotion to duty deserves the highest praise. He displayed the greatest gallantry."

In November 1942 he led the company during the Second Battle of Alamein, and then onwards, across Libya.

On 6 March 1943 Casano was badly wounded in a German air attack and whilst recovering he met Major-General Sir John Glubb (Glubb Pasha); the outcome of this meeting was he joined Sir John in the Arab Legion to take command of their armoured cars.

== Later life ==
Michael Casano - his surname is frequently misspelled - was granted a permanent commission and continued to serve in the RAF after the war, before retiring in 1958. He returned to his home town, in Kent, and became a driving instructor. In Folkestone, he was a notable figure and a keen member of the Folkestone Rowing Club.

Casano married Helen in 1943. The couple had a daughter.

Casano died in 2006 and a plaque to his memory was placed on the - then - newly restored Bandstand, on the Leas, shortly afterwards.
