= No. II Squadron RAF Regiment =

Regiment squadron of the Royal Air Force

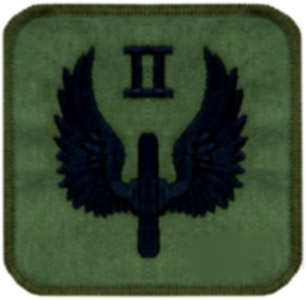
- DZ Flash
- Active: 1922 — present
- Country: United Kingdom
- Branch: Royal Air Force
- Type: Force Protection
- Role: Airborne light infantry
- Size: Four Flights; 175 personnel total
- Part of: Combat Readiness Force; Special Forces Support Group
- Garrison/HQ: RAF Brize Norton
- Mottos: Nunquam Non Paratus (Latin: "Never Unprepared")
- Battle honours: Transjordan 1924; Palestine 1936-1939; Egypt & Libya 1940-1943; Iraq 1941; Syria 1941; El Alamein 1941; North Africa 1943; Afghanistan 2001-2021

Insignia
- Identification symbol: Winged Tyre

The II Squadron RAF Regiment is a squadron of the RAF Regiment based at RAF Brize Norton. The squadron is parachute trained.

== History ==
The unit was formed as Number 2 Armoured Car Company RAF at Heliopolis, Egypt on 7 April 1922 and placed under the command of Squadron Leader M. Copenan. The Company was equipped with Rolls-Royce Armoured Car and Morris tenders, which it retained until 1944. In 1924 the unit was engaged in active operations against the Wahabi tribe who were causing unrest in Transjordan, then a British Protectorate. The actions took the form of a series of ground and air attacks against the fanatical tribesmen near the city of Amman. During the course of the battle, II ACC captured one of Wahabi tribe's coveted banners.

The Company's second battle honour was won during the Palestine troubles in 1936–1939, assisting the Palestine Police Force in search operations, convoy escorts, recovering downed aircrew, strike breaking and road patrols. When employed for convoy escort and road patrol, members of the Company found they were frequently under ambush or sniper fire. The high road speed of the Rolls-Royce Armoured car was found to be invaluable in a theatre where communication lines were frequently the target of sabotage.

=== Second World War ===
Throughout the Second World War the Company's expertise in desert operations, gained in the previous two decades, was put to good use. In September 1940 a section of the Company was detached to General Wavell's ground forces during the first offensive against the Italians in Egypt. It is said that these armoured cars became "the eyes and ears of Wavell". During the actions in the October of that year the Company was employed on convoy escort tasks, airfield defence, fighting reconnaissance patrols and screening operations. The Company performed well and became regarded as an asset to a force that was short of light reconnaissance elements.

==== Iraq ====
During the Iraqi Rebellion in 1941, No.2 Armoured Car Company RAF was part of the relief forces, and reached RAF Habbaniya as part of the Kingcol relief column on 18 May. Its advance was marked by brief but violent actions whilst under constant threat from snipers on a road that was blocked by anti-tank obstacles. The Company continued to provide the reconnaissance element for Kingcol and the advance on Baghdad. By the time the Armistice was agreed on 30 May the Company, under the command of Sqn Ldr Michael Casano who won an MC for his efforts in this theatre, was 10 miles from Baghdad. The Company established a base in Baghdad and then fought in Syria against Vichy French forces.

==== North Africa ====
The Company returned to the Western Desert in October in support of the Operation Crusader offensive. During this time the Company was employed on the tasks which it had earned its reputation. These included airfield defence, fighting and reconnaissance patrols and convoy escorts for RAF ground personnel. The Company was also required to carry out anti-parachute patrols. In January 1942 the Germans launched their counterattack. At this time the Company was at Antelat and the German counter offensive advanced as far as El Alamein. The Company provided defence for RAF assets as they withdrew. This also often involved recovering downed aircrew, guarding their aircraft where practical and where not, destroying the remains. During the period, prior to their withdrawal in March the Company was regularly bombed and strafed whilst defending airfields and landing strips. In May the Company returned to the Gambut area of the Western Desert to provide a defensive screen around the forward fighter airfields. During this time the Company was in continuous contact with the forward enemy tank columns and subsequently covered the withdrawal of No. 211 Group to the rear airfields.

In October El Alamein was again being fought over by the Allies and the Germans, leading to the Allied counter offensive. Again No. 2 Armoured Car Company was heavily employed escorting RAF Ground Crews forward, defending forward refuelling sites and landing strips. This continued into Libya where the venerable Rolls-Royce Armoured Cars were finally replaced with the Mk.1 GMC Light Reconnaissance Armoured Car. Receiving new equipment did not keep the company out of action as by the end of the month it was escorting RAF elements into Tunisia, becoming the only 8th Army Air Force unit to enter the city of Tunis.

=== Cold War ===
II Armoured Car Company was incorporated into the RAF Regiment on 3 October 1946 and was renumbered 2702 (Armoured Car) Squadron. This was not a popular decision as many of the Squadron were ex-aircrew who had been made redundant after the war, and who had joined the armoured car companies on the assumption that they would remain independent of the Regiment. A critical manning situation on the Squadron was experienced by the end of 1946 and this was attributed to the uncertainty of the Squadron's future following its amalgamation into the RAF Regiment. After pressure by Squadron members and veterans it was renumbered as No. II Armoured Car Squadron on 25 February 1947. The Squadron continued to operate in Palestine until the British Mandate ended in May 1948, being among the last units to leave Palestine.

The unit moved to Iraq for the next seven years and relinquished its armoured cars to become II (Field) Squadron RAF Regiment. From there it was on to Cyprus in 1955 and it was the last RAF Regiment unit to leave Iraq. In Cyprus the Squadron provided support to the Army in mine clearing and anti-EOKA terrorist operations. The Squadron moved to Malta in 1959, where the first Standard was presented on 25 November by Air Chief Marshal Sir Hubert Patch.

On 1 October 1960 the Squadron arrived in the United Kingdom for the first time during its 38-year history. II (Field) Squadron moved to RAF Felixstowe as part 33 Strategic Wing an element of the Global Strategic Reserve. In 1961 the Squadron deployed to carry out internal security operations at Bahrain in November 1961. This deployment was to last until February 1962.

In July 1962 II (Field) Squadron moved to RAF Colerne in Wiltshire as part of 38 Group and adopted a parachute capability. Thirteen men volunteered for parachute duties and the selection on ‘P’ Company run by the Parachute Regiment. To increase the number of men passing ‘P’ Company, a Pre-Parachute Selection Course was introduced successful completion of this course replaced the need to send men to ‘P’ Company. Upon successful completion of the selection, the men attended No.1 PTS at RAF Abingdon.

Throughout the 1960s the Squadron was tasked with internal security operations in Cyprus, Aden and Northern Ireland. On 1 January 1970 the Squadron title changed again, this time to II Squadron RAF Regiment. In July of the same year Support Weapons Flight were present at Salalah, Oman, when Sultan Qaboos overthrew his father in a coup. Other detachments during this time included RAF Muharraq in the Persian Gulf and Hong Kong.

When RAF Colerne was closed in 1976 the Squadron moved to RAF Catterick with II Squadron becoming part of 3 Wing, but within four years, the unit had moved back to Wiltshire, to RAF Hullavington on 19 August 1980. During the 1980s the Squadron converted to the Combat Vehicle Reconnaissance (Tracked) (CVR(T)). The Squadron carried out its validation exercise in April 1982, and was the first Squadron to become operational. The Squadron was equipped to provide each Flight with four Spartan and two Scorpion vehicles. The HQ element had a Sultan CP vehicle and a Samson recovery vehicle. The Squadron's firepower was provided by the Scorpions' 76 mm guns firing the dual purpose HESH round and a smoke round. The CVR(T) gave the Squadron protection from both small arms, shell fragments, and a high degree of collective protection against NBC agents. Night observation was also enhanced as each vehicle had its own night vision devices.

=== Persian Gulf War ===
During the Persian Gulf War in 1990, II Squadron provided Internal Security and Defence of RAF Akrotiri's Airfield until the return of 34 Squadron from the Persian Gulf region. On 8 August 1990 Kuwait was invaded by Iraq. On 30 August II Squadron received orders to be ready to move, initially to Cyprus, by 2/3 September. In September the Squadron deployed to RAF Akrotiri where it completed a demanding training schedule including a large amount of physical training to assist in acclimatisation. With the Squadron carrying routine defence operations, at a higher level of security, it witnessed the galling sight of seeing other Regiment Squadron's transiting through RAF Akrotiri en route to the Persian Gulf theatre whilst they remained on a main operating base. The boredom of this job was broken by a fire team on a Rigid Raider Patrol, who had suffered an engine failure. Unable to raise assistance they drifted for seven hours before discovery and rescue. Having maintained a high level of professionalism throughout a very frustrating detachment the Squadron returned to RAF Hullavington in December 1990.

=== 1990s to date ===
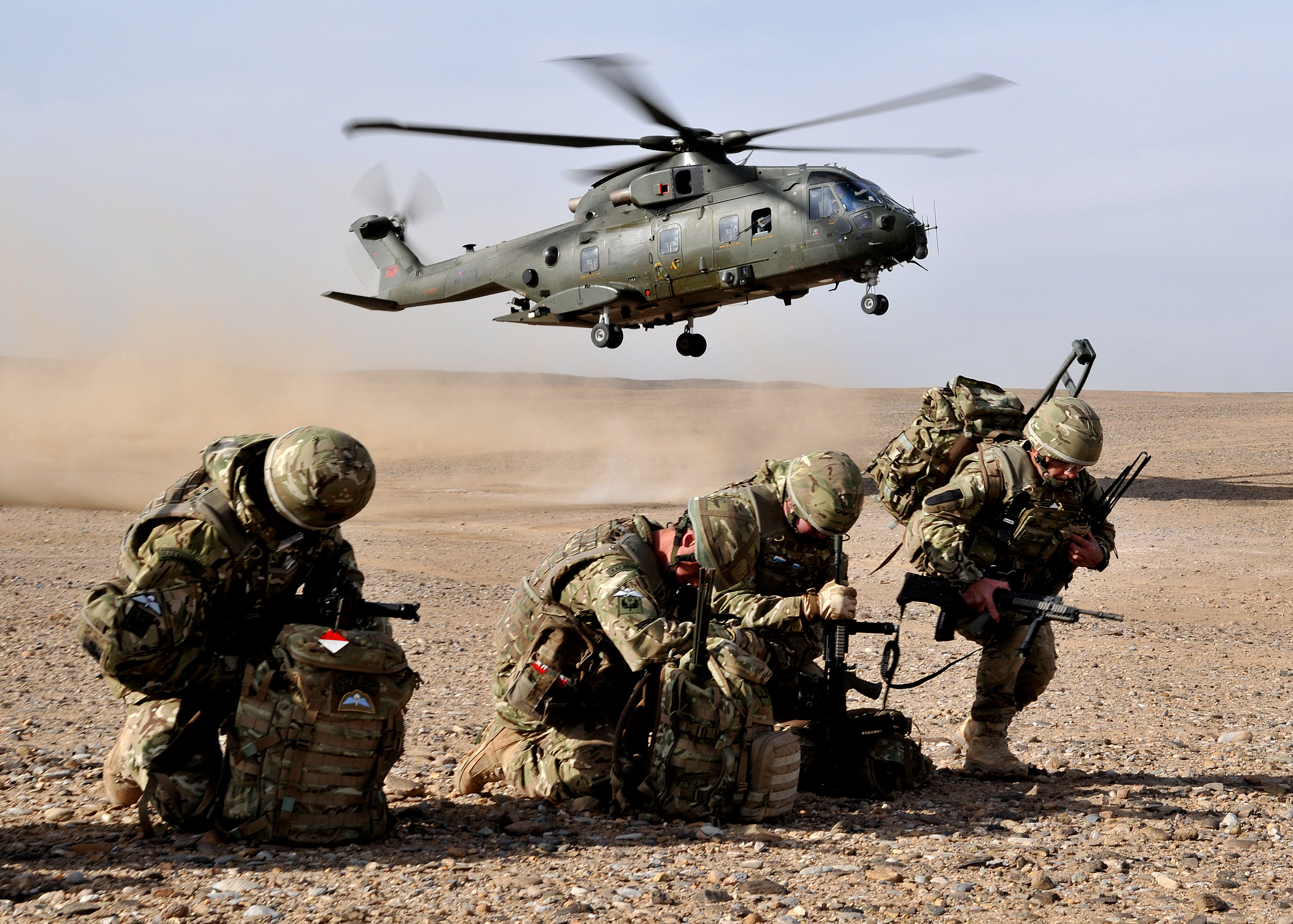
Members of II Squadron, RAF Regiment with an RAF Merlin HC3 helicopter landing during operations in Afghanistan, 2012

In January 1992 the Squadron moved to the Airport Camp in Belize providing the capability of holding it until the arrival of reinforcements. The exercise saw the Squadron move from the UK into Airport Camp and then immediately deploy into the surrounding scrubland and jungle. The Squadron later moved onto Exercise MAYAN SWORD, an exercise to test the resident defence battalion.

Upon its return to the UK, the Squadron was faced with the prospect of a move back to the RAF Regiment Depot at RAF Catterick. With the move to RAF Catterick came a change in role and in August, the Squadron officially converted to a Field Squadron relying once more upon the Land Rover for mobility and the 81 mm mortar for Squadron firepower.

In 1998, the Squadron was deployed to Kuwait on Operation Bolton to provide protection to Ali Al Salem Air Base and the air assets within, which were overseeing the no fly zones along the Kuwait/Iraq border. In 1999, the Squadron deployed to Kosovo providing security in depth around Pristina Airport.

In June 2000, an element of the squadron deployed to Sierra Leone to secure a helicopter detachment. In January 2001, the squadron participated in a demonstration jump exercise as part of Operation Silkman. Personnel took off from Ascension Island and parachuted onto a DZ near the airport, in order to demonstrate the UK's ability to rapidly reinforce Sierra Leone if necessary, in front of an audience invited by the International Military Assistance Training Team (IMATT).

Later in 2001, II Squadron were back at Ali Al Salem as the Resident Field Squadron. From October 2006 to April 2007, it returned as the Resident Field Squadron at Kandahar Air Base, in Afghanistan.

In common with the other squadrons of the RAF Regiment, II Squadron has deployed on both Operation Telic (in Iraq) and Operation Herrick (in Afghanistan). They have taken a number of casualties, including SAC Luke Southgate (KIA Kandahar, Operation Herrick) and SAC Ryan Tomlin (KIA Bealleawood, Operation Herrick).

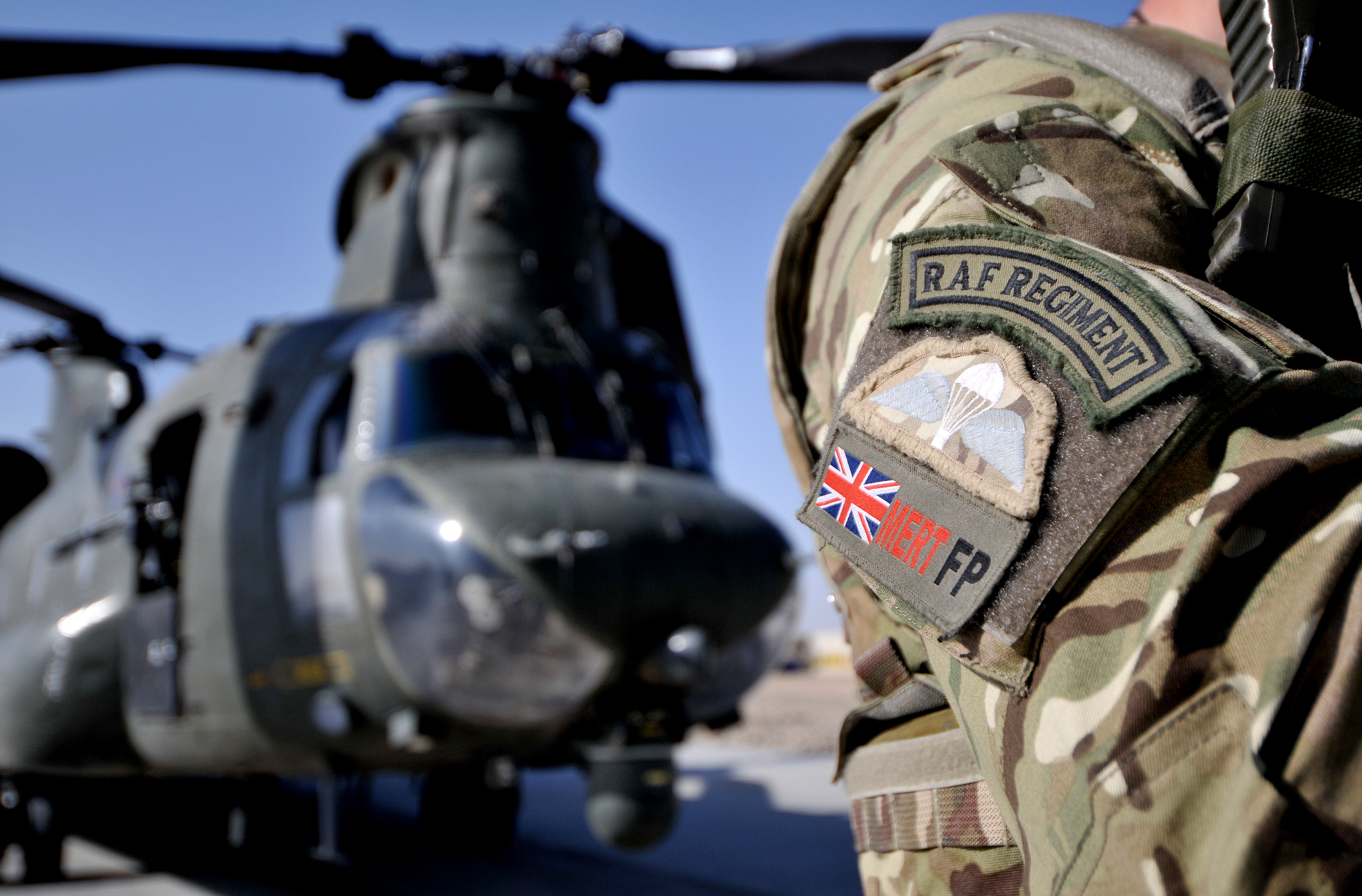
A squadron gunner guards a helicopter at Camp Bastion, in 2012.

In 2011, the II Squadron was twinned with the French Air Force Commando parachutiste de l'air 20.

In September 2018, the Squadron permanently moved to RAF Brize Norton from its previous home of RAF Honington and received a new Squadron standard, the move took the squadron over a year to complete.

== See also ==
- Fusiliers Commandos de l'Air
- Objektschutzregiment der Luftwaffe
- United States Air Force Security Forces
- Flygbasjägarna
- Royal Air Force Commandos
