= George Yip =

International academic

George Stephen Yip is Emeritus Professor of Marketing and Strategy at Imperial College Business School, London. Former professor and co-director of the Centre on China Innovation at China Europe International Business School (CEIBS). Other academic positions at Harvard, Georgetown, UCLA, Cambridge, London Business School. Now living in Boston and Maine, USA, and London. Former Dean of Rotterdam School of Management, Erasmus University. His book, Total Global Strategy: Managing for Worldwide Competitive Advantage (Prentice Hall, 1992; 1995) was selected as one of the 30 best business books of 1992 by Soundview Executive Book Summaries. Also, author or co-author of Pioneers, Hidden Champions, Change Makers, and Underdogs: Lessons from China's Innovators (2019), China's Next Strategic Advantage: From Imitation to Innovation (2016), Strategic Transformation (2013), Asian Advantage: Key Strategies for Winning in the Asia-Pacific Region (1998), and Total Global Strategy (1992 and 2012). Over 10,000 citations on Google Scholar. He serves on the editorial advisory boards of California Management Review, LRP and MIT Sloan Management Review. Boards of Hewnoaks Artist Colony (Maine) and MassOpera and Board of Advisors of Boston Lyric Opera. Chair of Research Advisory Committee, SKEMA Business School, France. Former board member of IDM, Glunz AG, Arlington Capital Management and Data Instruments, Inc., former advisory board member of Sonae SGPS and American University of Cairo Business School

He grew up in Hong Kong, Burma, and England and was educated at Dover College, and Magdalene College, Cambridge University in UK. An MBA from Harvard Business School, Yip also holds a Doctor of Business Administration in Business Policy degree from Harvard Business School where he was supervised by Michael E. Porter.

He has won two “best teaching” awards at UCLA and “best research” awards from Business Horizons (2000) and Journal of International Marketing (2000). The Times Higher Education Supplement ranked him among the 12 most successful academic consultants in the UK in any discipline (2006).

George Yip's business experience spans from marketing and product management to consulting and innovation. He began his business career working in marketing and product management with Unilever. He also worked in account management for Lintas. He was the Senior Manager of Price Waterhouse's strategic management consulting services in the Eastern United States, and also a Senior Associate with The MAC Group in Cambridge, Massachusetts. He was Director of Research & Innovation at Capgemini Consulting.

His current research interests are in China innovation, strategic transformation, and global customers.

== Personal life ==
Yip is married to Moira Yip, Emerita Professor of Linguistics at UCL, with whom he has two grown children and two grandchildren.

== Career ==
- Professor of Marketing and Strategy and Associate Dean for EMBA, Imperial College Business School (2015 - 2019)
- Professor of Management and Co- Director, Centre on China Innovation, China Europe International Business School (2011 - 2016)
- Dean, Rotterdam School of Management, Erasmus University (2008–2011)
- Director of Research & Innovation, Capgemini Consulting (2006–2008)
- Professor London Business School, (2001–2006), Associate Dean (2001–2003)
- Beckwith Professor and Chair of Marketing and Strategy, Cambridge University (1998–2000)
- Senior Manager, Strategic Management Consulting, Price Waterhouse, Boston, United States (1986–1987)
- Senior Associate, The MAC Group, Cambridge, Massachusetts (1983–1986)
- Assistant Professor, Harvard Business School, (1980–1983)
- Business Manager, Data Resources Inc (1976–1978)
- Account Supervisor and Product Manager, Unilever – Lintas and Birds Eye Foods (1970–1974)

== Books and articles ==
- Pioneers, Hidden Champions, Change Makers and Underdogs: Lessons From China's Innovators, 2019
- China's Next Strategic Advantage: From Imitation to Innovation, 2016
- Strategic Transformation: Changing While Winning, 2013.
- Total Global Strategy: Managing for Worldwide Competitive Advantage 1992; 1995 - ISBN 0-13-124488-4
- Managing Global Customers, E2007
- Total Global Strategy II, 2003
- Asian Advantage: Key Strategies for Winning in the Asia-Pacific Region, 2000 - ISBN 0-201-33978-1
- Strategies for Central and Eastern Europe, 2000
- Barriers to Entry: A Corporate Strategy Perspective, 1983
- Articles in several leading publications including California Management Review, Harvard Business Review, Sloan Management Review

== See also ==
- Strategy
