= No. 206 Squadron RAF =

Flying squadron of the Royal Air Force

- Squadron badge
- Active: 31 Dec 1916 (RNAS) – 27 Aug 1917; 1 Nov 1917 – 31 Mar 1918; 1 Apr 1918 (RAF) – 1 Feb 1920; 15 Jun 1936 – 25 Apr 1946; 17 Nov 1947 – 31 Aug 1949; 1 Dec 1949 – 20 Feb 1950; 27 Sep 1952 – 1 Apr 2005; 1 Apr 2009 – present
- Country: United Kingdom
- Branch: Royal Air Force
- Type: Flying squadron
- Role: Test and Evaluation
- Part of: Air & Space Warfare Centre
- Home station: RAF Brize Norton
- Mottos: Nihil nos effugit (Latin for 'Nothing escapes us')
- Aircraft: Airbus A400M Atlas C1
- Battle honours: Western Front (1916–1918)*; Arras (1917)*; Lys; Channel and North Sea (1939–1945)*; Atlantic (1939 and 1941–1945)*; Dunkirk; Invasion Ports (1940); Fortress Europe (1940 and 1942)*; German Ports (1940 and 1942); Biscay (1941 and 1943–1944)*; Bismarck*; Baltic (1945); South Atlantic (1982); Gulf (1991); Iraq (2003); Iraq (2003–2011); Afghanistan (2001–2014); * Honours marked with an asterisk are emblazoned on the squadron standard.

Insignia
- Squadron badge: An Octopus, with its many legs and quick activity, symbolises the squadron's efforts in many branches of service work. Approved by King George VI in January 1938.
- Squadron codes: WD (Nov 1938 – Sep 1939); VX (Sep 1939 – Mar 1944); PQ (Apr 1944 – Apr 1946); B (Sep 1952 – May 1958)

No. 206 Squadron is a Test and Evaluation Squadron of the Royal Air Force. Until 2005 it was employed in the maritime patrol role with the Nimrod MR.2 at RAF Kinloss, Moray. It was announced in December 2004 that 206 Squadron would disband on 1 April 2005, with half of its crews being redistributed to Nos. 120 and 201 Squadrons, also stationed at Kinloss. This was a part of the UK Defence Review called Delivering Security in a Changing World; the Nimrod MR.2 fleet was reduced in number from 21 to 16 as a consequence.

== History ==
=== Formation and early years ===
No. 206 Squadron was formed on 31 December 1916 as No. 6 Squadron, Royal Naval Air Service, a fighter unit operating Nieuport 17s and later Sopwith Camels over the Western Front before disbanding on 27 August 1917. The squadron was reformed on 1 January 1918 as a bomber and reconnaissance unit, operating Airco DH9s. With the establishment of the RAF in 1918 the squadron was renumbered No. 206 Squadron, RAF, being used for photo-reconnaissance in support of the British Second Army and for bombing support during the Allies final offensive. Following the Armistice it was used to operate an air mail service for the British occupying army in Germany, before being deployed to Helwan, Egypt in June 1919. It was renumbered as 47 Squadron on 1 February 1920.

Flying ace Major (later Group Captain) Ernest Norton served in the squadron during World War I.

=== Interbellum and World War II ===
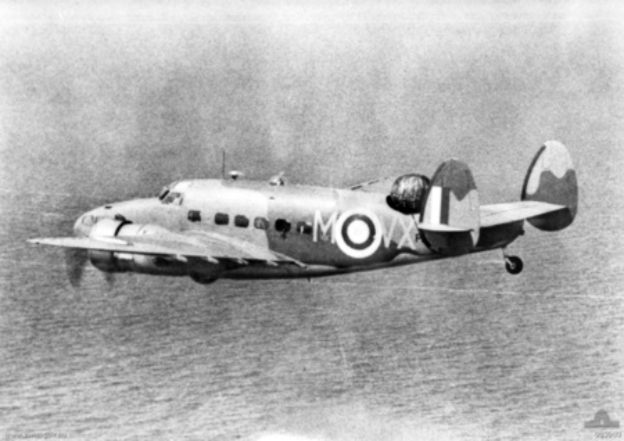
A 206 Sqn. Lockheed Hudson over the North Sea in 1940.

The squadron was reformed at RAF Manston from a flight of No. 48 Squadron on 15 June 1936, with Avro Ansons as part of the new RAF Coastal Command. It moved to RAF Bircham Newton on 30 July that year. It initially operated as a training squadron, but later assigned to maritime patrols.

On the outbreak of the Second World War, the Squadron entered into a routine of patrols with its Ansons from Bircham Newton with detachments at other bases around the United Kingdom, including RAF Carew Cheriton in South Wales and RAF Hooton Park on the Mersey. The squadron attacked German submarines on two occasions in September, with no effect (the 100 lb (45 kg) anti-submarine bombs used by the RAF at the time were ineffective weapons - one friendly-fire incident in December 1939 resulted in a direct hit on the conning tower of the British submarine HMS Snapper with the sole damage being four broken light bulbs). The squadron's Ansons also occasionally encountered German maritime reconnaissance aircraft. On 8 November, one shot down a Heinkel He 115 floatplane. On the same day, a different Anson engaged and hit two Dornier Do 18, probably shooting one down.

In March 1940, the squadron began to re-equip with the Lockheed Hudson, flying the first patrols using the new aircraft on 12 April. It converted to the Boeing Fortress Mk.II in July 1942, allowing long range patrols over the Atlantic, moving to the Azores during October 1943, before returning to the United Kingdom for re-equipping with the Consolidated Liberator Mk.VI, later augmented by the Liberators Mk.VIII. The Squadron's Liberators were based at RAF St Eval until after D-Day, when the unit moved North to RAF Leuchars. A section was detached to West Africa for anti-submarine and convoy patrols as No. 200 Squadron RAF. Detachments also operated from bases such as RAF St Eval in Cornwall and RAF Aldergrove in County Antrim. On 25 June 1945 the squadron transferred to Transport Command and flew trooping flights until 25 April 1946 when it disbanded.

206 Squadron was a successful anti-submarine unit, accounting for nine U-boats destroyed during the Second World War.

=== Post-war ===
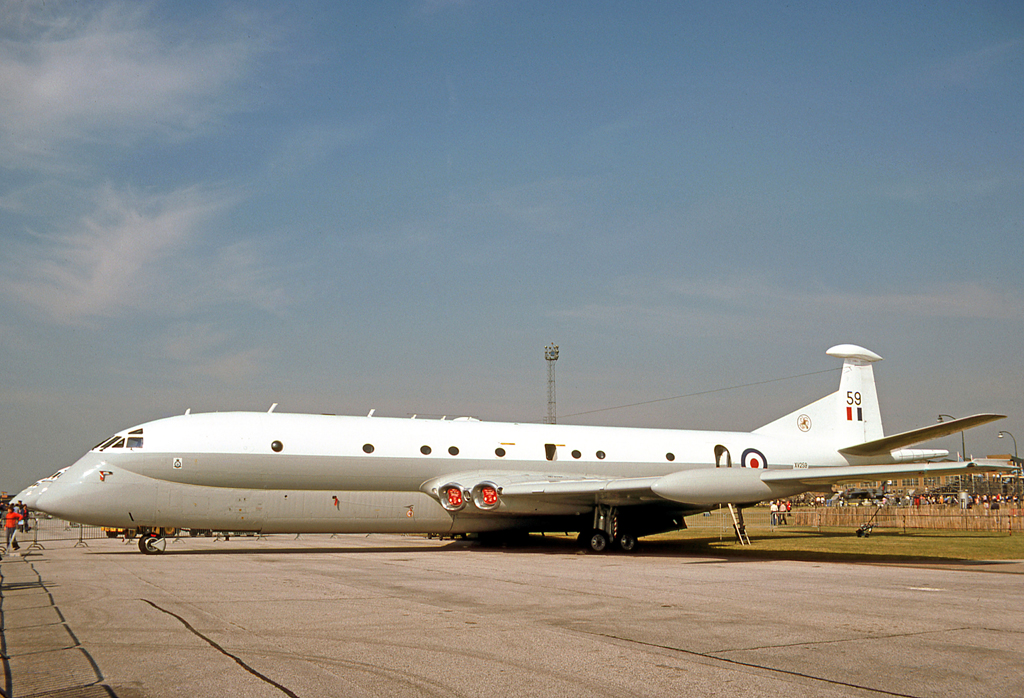
Hawker Siddeley Nimrod MR.1 maritime reconnaissance aircraft of No. 206 Squadron in 1977.

The squadron was reformed on 17 November 1947, flying Avro York C.1 transport aircraft, but again disbanded on 31 August 1949. It was soon reformed on 1 December 1949, flying Douglas Dakotas, the military transport version of the well-known Douglas DC-3 airliner. This lasted only till 20 February 1950 however.

Reformed yet again on 27 September 1952 as a maritime reconnaissance squadron, it was equipped with Avro Shackletons and based at RAF St Eval in Cornwall. The squadron moved to RAF Kinloss in Scotland in July 1965 and was re-equipped with the jet-powered Hawker-Siddeley Nimrod in November 1970. It continued to operate the Nimrod until disbanding on 1 April 2005.

=== Present ===
On 1 April 2009, the Heavy Aircraft Test & Evaluation Squadron at Boscombe Down (Air Space Warfare Centre) gained the 206 Squadron numberplate, as 206 (Reserve) Squadron. Currently split between RAF Boscombe Down and RAF Brize Norton with 'B Flt' C130 specialists moved from RAF Lyneham in June 2011 to their new home at RAF Brize Norton in Oxfordshire to continue the Hercules Test and Evaluation process.

== Aircraft operated ==
data from
From	To	Aircraft	Version
Dec 1916	Jun 1917	Nieuport 17	
Jun 1917	Aug 1917	Sopwith Camel	
Jan 1918	Mar 1918	Airco D.H.4	
Feb 1918	Jan 1920	Airco D.H.9	
Jun 1936	Jun 1940	Avro Anson	Mk.I
Mar 1940	Aug 1942	Lockheed Hudson	Mk.I
Apr 1941	Jun 1941	Lockheed Hudson	Mk.II
Apr 1941	Aug 1942	Lockheed Hudson	Mk.III
Apr 1941	Aug 1941	Lockheed Hudson	Mk.IV
Jun 1941	Aug 1942	Lockheed Hudson	Mk.V
Jul 1942	Apr 1944	Boeing Fortress	Mks.II, IIA
Apr 1944	Apr 1946	Consolidated Liberator	Mk.VI
Mar 1945	Apr 1946	Consolidated Liberator	Mk.VIII
Nov 1947	Feb 1950	Avro York	C.1
Jan 1950	Feb 1950	Douglas Dakota	C.4
Sep 1952	May 1958	Avro Shackleton	MR.1A
Feb 1953	Jun 1954	Avro Shackleton	MR.2
Jan 1958	Oct 1970	Avro Shackleton	MR.3
Nov 1970	Sep 1979	Hawker-Siddeley Nimrod	MR.1
Oct 1979	Apr 2005	Hawker-Siddeley Nimrod	MR.2
Apr 2009	Jun 2023	Lockheed Hercules	Mk.4/5
Nov 2014	Present	Airbus Atlas	C.1

== See also ==
- List of Royal Air Force aircraft squadrons

== Bibliography ==
- Ashworth, Chris. Encyclopedia of Modern Royal Air Force Squadrons. Wellingborough, UK: Patrick Stevens Limited, 1989. ISBN 1-85260-013-6.
- Bowyer, Michael J.F and John D.R. Rawlings. Squadron Codes, 1937–56. Cambridge, Cambridgeshire, UK: Patrick Stephens Ltd., 1979. ISBN 0-85059-364-6.
- Flintham, Vic and Andrew Thomas. Combat Codes: A Full Explanation and Listing of British, Commonwealth and Allied Air Force Unit Codes Since 1938. Shrewsbury, Shropshire, UK: Airlife Publishing Ltd., 2003. ISBN 1-84037-281-8.
- Franks, Norman. Nieuport Aces of World War I. Osprey Publishing, 2000. ISBN 1-85532-961-1, ISBN 978-1-85532-961-4.
- Halley, James J. Famous Maritime Squadrons of the RAF, Volume 1. Windsor, Berkshire, UK: Hylton Lacy Publishers Ltd., 1973. ISBN 0-85064-101-2.
- Halley, James J. The Squadrons of the Royal Air Force & Commonwealth, 1918–1988. Tonbridge, Kent, UK: Air-Britain (Historians) Ltd., 1988. ISBN 0-85130-164-9.
- Jefford, C.G. RAF Squadrons, a Comprehensive Record of the Movement and Equipment of all RAF Squadrons and their Antecedents since 1912. Shrewsbury, Shropshire, UK: Airlife Publishing Ltd., 2001. ISBN 1-84037-141-2.
- Lewis, Peter. Squadron Histories: R.F.C, R.N.A.S and R.A.F., 1912–59. London: Putnam, 1959.
- Moyes, Philip J.R. Bomber Squadrons of the RAF and their Aircraft. London: Macdonald and Jane's (Publishers) Ltd., 1964 (new edition 1976). ISBN 0-354-01027-1.
- Neistle, Axel. German U-Boat Losses during World War II (1998) Greenhill Books. ISBN 1-85367-352-8
- Rawlings, John D.R. Coastal, Support and Special Squadrons of the RAF and their Aircraft. London: Jane's Publishing Company Ltd., 1982. ISBN 0-7106-0187-5.
- Rawlings, John D.R. Fighter Squadrons of the RAF and their Aircraft. London: Macdonald and Jane's (Publishers) Ltd., 1969 (new edition 1976, reprinted 1978). ISBN 0-354-01028-X.
- Westrop, Mike. History of no. 6 Squadron Royal Naval Air Service in World War I. Atglen, Pennsylvania; Schiffer Publishing, 2006. ISBN 0-7643-2425-X.
