= Dover College =

Coordinates: 51°7′38″N 1°18′24″E

Location
- Effingham Crescent; Dover, Kent, CT17 9RH; England

Information
- Type: Public School; Private day and boarding
- Motto: Latin: Non recuso laborem (I cannot refuse the task)
- Religious affiliation: Church of England
- Established: 15 September 1871
- Founder: Edward Astley
- Department for Education URN: 118940 Tables
- Chairman of the Governors: Nathan Harris
- Headmaster: Philip Tattersall-King
- Staff: 50 (approx.)
- Gender: Co-educational
- Age: 2 to 18
- Enrolment: 239
- Houses: 5
- Colours: Nero Grey and Supernova Yellow
- School fees: Termly Fees: £3,667 - £6,995 (Day) £10,184 - £14,667 (Boarding)
- Alumni: Old Dovorians
- Website: http://www.dovercollege.org.uk/

Dover College is an independent day and boarding school in the English public school tradition located in Dover in south east England. It was founded in 1871, and takes both day pupils and boarders from the UK and internationally.

The school occupies some of the medieval buildings of Dover Priory, on a site just east of the eponymous railway station.

== History ==
=== Foundation ===
In 1869 Robert Chignell, who had a private school at Westmount, in Folkestone Road, leased part of the Dover Priory buildings for a private school. He passed on his interest, however, to a group of leading citizens and local businessmen in Dover, led by the Mayor of Dover, Dr. Astley, who had formed the Dover College Company to promote the foundation of a public school for the town on what remained of the Priory site with the dual intention of providing a public school education for local boys and of using and thus preserving the Priory's remaining ancient buildings.

It is set in the grounds and ruins of the Priory of St. Martin, which was ransacked by King Henry VIII as part of his dissolution of the monasteries. The priory gives its name to Dover's main railway station which was built on the western part of the priory site. Some of the original medieval buildings remain. The 12th century Strangers' Refectory is still used as an eating hall and for concerts (it is Grade II* listed). The college chapel was originally the priory guesthouse, it was built in the 12th century, it is Grade II* listed. The bell tower was added in the late 19th century. The gatehouse of the priory (also listed) is used as a music room. The central lawn of the school is still referred to as The Close. The composer Thomas Tallis was organist to the priory in the 1530s, and is commemorated in the naming of the college's Tallis Music School.

The college was founded and opened as a boys' school on 15 September 1871. By the end of the first term there were 21 boys in the school, and by the end of the next summer another 32 had joined them. It acquired the large hall, or guest-house, in 1879 and converted it into a school Chapel by enlarging the east end into an apse. In time, the Ecclesiastical Commissioners made over the whole property to the College Trustees. The refectory was restored, revealing an important but damaged fresco, as (in 1881, to mark a charitable act by Sir Richard Dickenson the then mayor of Dover) was the gatehouse. The Gatehouse was restored by the celebrated architect George Edmund Street and is currently used as the music room for the Junior Department.

=== 20th century ===
In August 1917, part of the school was damaged during an air raid, and the decision was finally taken to evacuate the college from Dover to Leamington College in Leamington Spa in the Midlands; the school returned to Dover in 1919 with only 150 pupils. During World War I, in common with many other schools, Old Dovorians became officers in the British Armed Forces and as a result suffered high casualty rates. 177 former pupils died; 58 Dovorians were awarded the DSO and 89 the MC – of the foreign awards 8 were awarded Croix de Guerre and 6 the Russian Order of Saint Stanislas. One Naval officer – Arthur Leyland Harrison – posthumously received the Victoria Cross for the Zeebrugge raid; another old boy, Gen Sir Reginald Dallas Brooks, was also on that raid and won his DSO before going on to become Governor of Victoria.

In 1921 the Jubilee of the School was celebrated, including the dedication of the War Memorial and the Bell Memorial in the chapel. 1922 a trust set up by the old boys took ownership of the college and in 1923 it was reconstituted with a Royal Charter, which defined its aims:

The object of the Corporation of Dover College shall be the conduct of a College for boys … in which they may receive a sound religious, classical, mathematical, scientific and general education and the doing of such things as are conducive to the attainment of this objective.

During the Second World War, Dover was on the front line, with only the Straits of Dover separating the town from Nazi-occupied France, and one of the most likely areas for a German invasion. As a result, the school was again evacuated, initially for a term to Blundell's School in Devon with which Dover College had a long-standing friendship, and thence to Poltimore House, also in Devon. It returned to Dover in 1945 with 168 boys. During the war 102 former pupils died; Lt Col Terence Otway won a famous DSO for his action in capturing the Merville Battery on D-Day.

In 1957 was the first public school in the UK to formally create an International Department. In 1974, Dover College was one of the first English public schools to become fully co-educational.

In 1990 the college was taken to court by its head of history who claimed unfair dismissal on the grounds of illness. The case is known as Hogg v Dover College.

=== 21st century ===
In September 2001 Dover College opened a junior department for pupils aged 4–11. In 2009, it opened a pre-reception class to welcome three-year-old children.

The college renovated its music facilities under Stephen Jones, Headmaster from 2004 to 2011 who went on to be Warden of St. Edward's School, Oxford. Under the leadership of Gerry Holden from 2011 to 2014, the college went through a period of change, which was re-directed upon the appointment of Gareth Doodes as headmaster from January 2015. In the intervening years the college now has the highest inspection judgements possible, an increase in the school roll, and a new curriculum based on creativity. In preparation for the college's 150th anniversary in 2021, the college launched a new development plan, Project 150, that will see the building of a new theatre, pavilion at Farthingloe, renovation of boarding houses and classrooms, and improved international outreach with membership of the Round Square Organisation.

== Coat of arms ==
The school coat of arms shows St. Martin dividing his cloak, which he shared with a beggar. Martin of Tours is patron saint of France, and therefore appropriate for the English school closer than any other to France.

== Inspection ==
In 2024 the school was inspected under ISI's new framework. It took place over 2.5 days and during that time inspectors observed lessons, met with many pupils and several teaching and non-teaching staff. Subject leaders were praised for planning the curriculum effectively so that pupils receive engaging range of lessons and co-curricular activities that allow them to make progress and experience success. They also noted that pupils who have educational needs and / or disability (SEND) are well supported and parents, staff and pupils express confidence that individual needs will met in a supportive and validating environment where everyone can achieve their personal best.

== Reviews ==
In 2026 the school was reviewed by The Good Schools Guide who are a trusted guide to schools in the UK. The school was praised for offering "a nurturing education, tailored for pupils who flourish in a small, caring environments where they are known, understood and encouraged to grow. Pupils are met where they are and helped to find where they are going. And along the way, learning to sail, getting hand dirty on the farm, or performing on stage all play their part in shaping grounded young people."

== Notable alumni ==
- Dr Reginald Koettlitz (1860–1916); Doctor and Polar Explorer
- Frederic Maugham, 1st Viscount Maugham (1866–1958); Lord Chancellor
- Tyrone Power Sr. (1869–1931); Anglo-American actor
- O. B. Clarence (1870–1955); English actor
- Richard Reginald Goulden (1876–1932); portrait sculptor & creator of public memorials
- The Most Reverend Howard West Kilvinton Mowll D.D. (1890–1958); Archbishop of Sydney and Primate of Australia
- Richard Aldington (1892–1962); writer and poet
- General Sir Dallas Brooks (1896–1966); DSO – Zeebrugge Raid; Governor of Victoria – 1949–1963
- Air Marshal Sir Hugh Walmsley KCB, KCIE, CBE, MC, DFC (1898–1985); Chief of the Air Staff (India)
- Cecil Madden (1902–1987); radio and television producer
- Sir Frederick Ashton OM, CH, CBE (1904–1988); choreographer of the Royal Ballet
- Edgar Christian (1908–1927); see Cold Burial published in 2002
- Group Captain Athol Forbes OBE (1912–1981); Flight leader in 303 Squadron during the Battle of Britain, later commander of 66 Squadron
- Squadron Leader Michael Casano MC (1913–2006); Commander of No 2 Armoured Car Company RAF
- Colonel Terence Otway DSO (1914–2006); CO of 9 Para on D-Day (Merville Battery)
- J. Lee Thompson (1914–2002); film director
- Sir Donald Luddington KBE, CMG, CVO (1920–2009); British colonial government official
- Geoffrey Barnes, CBE (1932–2010); Secretary for Security for Hong Kong, Commissioner of ICAC
- Michael Kuhn (born 1949); film director
- Simon Cowell (born 1959); TV personality
- Sammy Moore (born 1987); professional footballer

== Notable members of staff ==
- Vivian Jenkins, Welsh Rugby Player and vice-captain of the British Lions 1938
- Jeffrey Archer, taught at the school in the 1960s
- Ralph Townsend, taught at the school in the 1970s

=== Headmasters ===
The school has had fifteen headmasters since its foundation.

Canon William Bell, 1871–1892

Reverend William Cookorthy Compton, 1892–1910

F de W Lushington, 1910–1915

George Renwick 1934–1954

Alec Peterson 1954–1957

Tim Cobb

David Cope,

Jack Ind, 1980s

Martin Wright, 1990s

Howard Blackett, 1997–2004

Stephen Jones, 2004–2011

Gerry Holden, 2011–2014

Gareth Doodes, 2015–2020

Simon Fisher 2020–2025

Phil Tattersall-King 2025- present.
