= Dissimilation (phonology) =

Linguistic phenomenon where sounds diverge

In phonology, particularly within historical linguistics, dissimilation is a phenomenon whereby similar consonants or vowels in a word become less similar or elided. In English, dissimilation is particularly common with liquid consonants such as /r/ and /l/ when they occur in a sequence. The phenomenon is often credited to horror aequi, the principle that language users avoid repetition of identical linguistic structures.

== Examples ==
=== Dropped initial /r/ in /r..r/ sequence (r-deletion) ===
When an /r/ sound occurs along with another in the middle of a word in rhotic dialects of English, the most weakly-stressed tends to drop out, as in "beserk" for berserk, "suprise" for surprise, "paticular" for particular, and "govenor" for governor. This does not affect the pronunciation of government, which has only one /r/, but English government tends to be pronounced "goverment", dropping the first n. Nor does this phenomenon affect the unstressed syllable in words like surfer or brother, since they come at the end of the word.

In English, r-deletion occurs when a syllable is unstressed and /r/ may drop out altogether, as in "deteriate" for deteriorate and "tempature" for temperature, a process called haplology. When the /r/ is found in /bru/, it may change to /j/—e.g. February → Febyuary, which has been explained by phonotactic factors or alternatively by morphological analogy with more common sequences such as January. Cf. nucular, which may have arisen through an analogous process.

r-deletion is not universally applied in regard to primary and tertiary stress. For example, forward is typically affected (foward), but foreword and Harvard are not. Foreword's lack of r-deletion may be due to its lower-frequency usage, but this inconsistency may also indicate that the process is still in flux and not yet fully established.

=== Dissimilation of /l..l/ to /r..l/ ===
An example of a relatively old case of phonetic dissimilation artificially undone in the spelling is English colonel, whose standard pronunciation is [ˈkɝnəl] (with the r sound) in North-American English or [ˈkɜːnəl] in RP. It was formerly spelt coronel and is a borrowing from French coronnel, which arose as a result of dissimilation from Italian colonnello.

=== Dissimilation of /r..r/ to /l..r/ ===
- Latin peregrinus > Old French pelegrin (and the Italian pellegrino and Sicilian piḍḍigrinu), which gave rise to the English pilgrim.

== Causes ==
There are several hypotheses on the cause of dissimilation. According to John Ohala, listeners are confused by sounds with long-distance acoustic effects. In the case of English /r/, rhoticization spreads across much of the word: in rapid speech, many of the vowels may sound as if they had an r. It may be difficult to tell whether a word has one source of rhoticity or two. When there are two, a listener might wrongly interpret one as an acoustic effect of the other, and so mentally filter it out.

This factoring out of coarticulatory effects has been experimentally replicated. For example, Greek pakhu- (παχυ-) 'thick' derives from an earlier *phakhu-. When test subjects are asked to say the *phakhu- form in casual speech, the aspiration from both consonants pervades both syllables, making the vowels breathy. Listeners hear a single effect, breathy voiced vowels, and attribute it to one rather than both of the consonants, as they assume the breathiness on the other syllable is a long-distance coarticulatory effect, thus replicating the historical change in the Greek word.

If Ohala is correct, one might expect to find dissimilation in other languages with sounds that frequently cause long-distance effects, such as nasalization and pharyngealization.

== Types ==
Dissimilation, like assimilation, may involve a change in pronunciation relative to a segment adjacent to the affected segment or at a distance, and may involve a change relative to a preceding or a following segment. As with assimilation, anticipatory dissimilation is much more common than lag dissimilation, but unlike assimilation, most dissimilation is triggered by non-contiguous segments. Also, while many kinds of assimilation have the character of a sound law, few dissimilations do; most are accidents that befall a particular lexical item.

=== Anticipatory dissimilation ===
Anticipatory dissimilation at a distance (by far the most common):

- Latin *medio-diēs ('mid-day', i.e. "noon"; also "south") became merīdiēs. Latin venēnum "poison" > Italian veleno. This category includes a rare example of a systematic sound law, the dissimilation of aspirates in Greek and Sanskrit known as Grassmann's Law: *thi-thē-mi 'I put' (with a reduplicated prefix) > Greek tí-thē-mi (τίθημι), *phakhu 'thick' > Greek pakhus (παχύς), *sekhō 'I have' > *hekhō > Greek ékhō (ἔχω; cf. future *hekh-s-ō > héksō ἕξω). Some apparent cases are problematic, as in English "eksetera" for etcetera, which may be contamination from the numerous forms in eks- (or a combination of influences), though the common misspelling "ect." implies dissimilation.

Anticipatory dissimilation from a contiguous segment (very rare):

- The change from fricative to stop articulation in a sequence of fricatives may belong here: German sechs /zeks/ (as evidenced by the spelling, the /k/ was previously a fricative). In Sanskrit, in any original sequence of two sibilants the first became a stop (often with further developments): root vas- 'dress', fut. vas-sya- > vatsya-; *wiś-s 'clan' (nom.sg.) > *viťś > *viṭṣ > viṭ (final clusters are simplified); *wiś-su locative pl. > *viṭṣu > vikṣu. English amphitheater is very commonly pronounced "ampitheater", but this may be explained by spelling pronunciation. Russian конфорка [kɐnˈforkə] 'stove burner' is from Dutch komfoor 'brazier'.

=== Lag dissimilation ===
Lag dissimilation at a distance (fairly common):

- English purple is in medieval English as purpul and purpure (in medieval French porpre) and comes from classical Latin purpura 'purple' with dissimilation of /r/ to /L/. Latin rārus 'rare' > Italian rado. Cardamom is commonly pronounced cardamon. In Middle English, in some words ending in -n preceded by a coronal consonant the -n changed to -m: seldom, random, venom. English marble is ultimately from Latin marmor. Russian февраль /fevrˈalʲ/ 'February' is from Latin Februārius.
- In Spanish, interchanges between /r/ and /l/ are common; for a list, see History of the Spanish language § Interchange of the liquids /l/ and /r/. In Basque, dissimilation is frequent as well.

Lag dissimilation from a contiguous segment (very rare):

- Latin hominem ("man", acc.) > Old Spanish omne > omre > Spanish hombre
- Latin nomine ("name", abl.) > nomre > Spanish nombre
- English chimney (standard) > chim(b)ley (dialectal)
- Proto-Slavic *svobodà 'freedom' > Slovak sloboda (vs. Czech svoboda)
- In Irish, many dialects regularly change the sequence /mn/ to /mɾ/

== Paradigmatic dissimilation ==
When, through sound change, elements of a grammatical paradigm conflate in a way not easily remedied by rewording, the forms may dissimilate. For example, in modern Korean the vowels /e/ and /ɛ/ are merging for many people in Seoul, and concurrently the second-person pronoun 네 /ne/ 'your' is shifting to 니 /ni/ to avoid confusion with the first-person pronoun 내 /nɛ/ 'my'.

Similarly, it appears that English she, historically heo, may have acquired its modern sh form through dissimilation from he, though it is unclear whether the mechanism was idiosyncratic sound change (palatalization) of heo or substitution for heo of the feminine demonstrative pronoun seo.

== See also ==
- Assimilation (linguistics)

== Sources ==
- Crowley, Terry. (1997) An Introduction to Historical Linguistics. 3rd edition. Oxford University Press.
- Dissimilation (International Encyclopedia of Linguistics, 2nd ed.)
