= Horror aequi =

Linguistic principle

Horror aequi, (Note: literally 'fear of the same' or 'a dread of things that are equal' in Latin; cf. horror vacui) also known as identity avoidance or avoidance of identity, is a linguistic principle that language users have psychological or physiological motives or limits on cognitive planning to avoid repetition of identical linguistic structures.

The term originated in 1909 in Karl Brugmann, who used it to explain dissimilation, the tendency for similar consonants or vowels in a word to become less similar, which can often be chalked up to simply "euphony". Today, however, the term is usually applied instead to grammatical elements or structures.

One of the most widely cited definitions is that of Günter Rohdenburg: "the horror aequi principle involves the widespread (and presumably universal) tendency to avoid the use of formally (near-)identical and (near-)adjacent (non-coordinate) grammatical elements or structures."

In the study of phonology, such avoidance falls under the obligatory contour principle, which holds that certain consecutive identical sounds are not permitted (such as in Mandarin Chinese, where two third tones are not used consecutively).

The term horror aequi is sometimes extended to the stylistic preference to avoid repeating the same word in a given text, also known as elegant variation.

== Horror aequi in English ==
One illustration of horror aequi in English is the use of and + verb rather than the typical to + verb following certain to-infinitive verbs such as wait, try and check in order to avoid repeating the to + verb pattern. Thus, speakers typically use:

- I'll try to find a solution.
- I tried to open the door.
- I'll wait to hear the answer.
- I waited to start the process till the audience was assembled.

But following a to-infinitive, speakers will often use and instead of to:

- I'm going to try and find a solution.
- I wanted to try and open the door.
- I'm going to wait and hear the answer.
- I wanted to wait and start the process.

In addition to using and instead of to in order to avoid horror aequi, a strategy is to delay the second to + verb with intervening words. For example:

- I wanted to wait for a few minutes to start the process.

In some cases, the horror aequi principle is said to be responsible for stronger prescriptive rules, such as the ungrammatical use of verb + -ing followed by verb + -ing (gerund) where a to-infinitive in possible.

These pairs are grammatical:

- It began to rain.
- It began raining.
- They will continue to drive.
- They will continue driving.

However, when the first verb is in an -ing form, it is only grammatical to follow it with a to-infinitive. Thus, the latter of each pair is unacceptable:

- It was beginning to rain.
- *It was beginning raining.
- They are continuing to drive.
- *They are continuing driving.

Horror aequi does not influence verbs that may only be followed by an -ing verb.

- They will consider driving.
- They are considering driving.

Other examples clearly demonstrate how horror aequi helps prevent confusion. Sentences with repetitive words or forms can be nearly incomprehensible even when adhering to grammatical rules.

- ?The boy who the girl who the other boy had hit had called came running.

Confusion here comes from both the repeated embedded who relative clauses and from the lack of semantic variety. Merely adding semantic difference can add some clarity:

- ?The number that the girl who the horse had kicked had called was for animal control.

The horror aequi principle holds that both of these examples would be avoided.

== See also ==
- Uses of English verb forms
