= Moira Yip =

British-American linguist (born 1949)

- Born: 1949 (age 76–77)
- Known for: Contributions to tonal linguistics
- Spouse: George Yip

Academic background
- Education: Massachusetts Institute of Technology
- Thesis: The Tonal Phonology of Chinese (1980)
- Doctoral advisor: Morris Halle

Academic work
- Discipline: Theoretical linguistics
- Institutions: University College London; University of California, Irvine; Brandeis University
- Notable works: Tone (2002)
- Website: www.eyesonthewild.blog

Moira Yip (born 1949) is a British-American linguist and professor emerita of University College London.

== Biography ==
She earned her PhD in Linguistics in 1980 at MIT as a student of Morris Halle. She retired from her position as Professor of Linguistics at University College London in 2009. While at UCL she also was co-director of the Centre for Human Communication and Pro-Provost for China. Before taking up the position at UCL in 1999, she was Professor of Linguistics and Acting Dean at the University of California, Irvine (1992–1999) and Associate Professor at Brandeis University (1982–1992).

Moira Yip worked on a wide range of issues in theoretical phonology, and particularly on the phonology of Chinese. Her publications include papers on reduplication, morphophonology, prosodic phonology, and feature theory. Her frequently cited dissertation The Tonal Phonology of Chinese was published in the Outstanding Dissertations in Linguistics series (Garland). Her 1988 journal article on the obligatory contour principle was important in extending the understanding and application of this principle in pre–optimality theory phonology. In 2002, she published the first modern textbook on tone in the Cambridge University Press linguistics textbook series.

She is married to business academic George Yip. Since 2017, she has authored a wildlife blog, Eyes on the Wild. As of December 2025, Yip lives in Lovell, Maine.

== Key publications ==
- Yip, Moira J. 1980. The tonal phonology of Chinese. PhD dissertation, MIT.
- Yip, Moira. 1988. The Obligatory Contour Principle and Phonological Rules: a Loss of Identity. Linguistic Inquiry, 19 (1), 65–100.
- Yip, Moira. 1989. Contour tones. Phonology, 6(1), 149–174.
- Yip, Moira. 2002. Tone. Cambridge University Press.
