= RAF Armoured Car Company =

RAF Armoured Car Companies
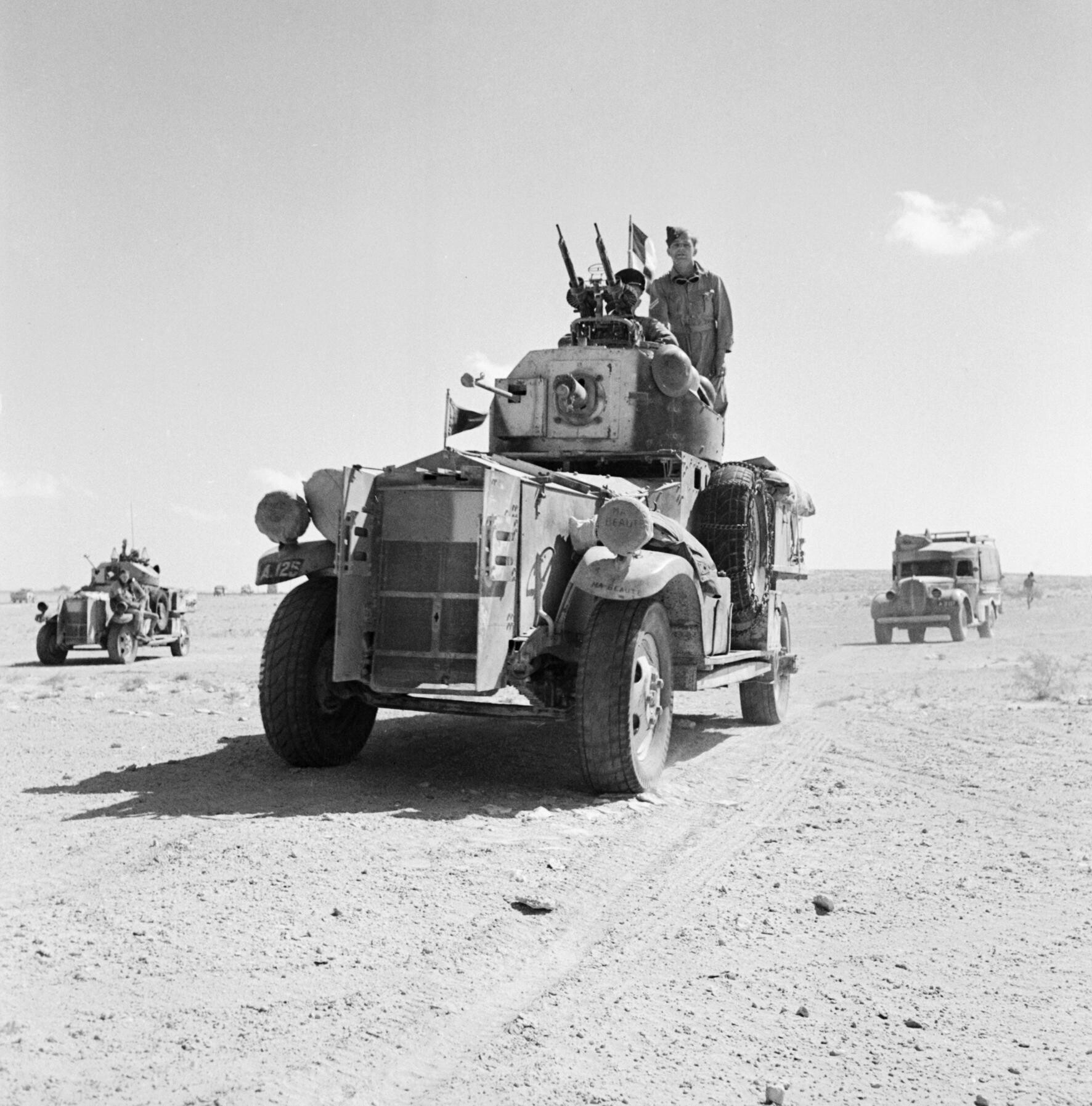
- Fordson Armoured Cars and support vehicles of No. 2 Armoured Car Company RAF, leave their base for a patrol in the Western Desert, 1941.
- Active: 19 December 1921 to 3 October 1946
- Country: United Kingdom
- Branch: Royal Air Force
- Type: Light armoured car companies
- Role: colonial policing

The RAF Armoured Car Companies were part of Britain's Royal Air Force (RAF) based in Iraq, Palestine and Transjordan. They were formed to operate with aircraft squadrons to suppress insurrection and maintain peace in the area in the aftermath of World War I.

== Reason For Creation ==
A large and expensive army was required to maintain peace in Mesopotamia after the defeat of the Ottoman Empire by the British in the Mesopotamian campaign of World War I. At the Cairo Conference (1921) it was agreed by Chief of the Air Staff Lord Trenchard and Secretary of State for the Colonies Winston Churchill that the Royal Air Force would take over control from the British Army. It was considered the security of the newly created country of Iraq could be achieved by aircraft squadrons supported by RAF armoured cars and a small number of ground forces.

== Creation ==
In the winter of 1921/1922 airmen and officers of the RAF were assembled at RAF Heliopolis on the outskirts of Cairo in Egypt to train and form the nucleus of the RAF Armoured Car Companies.

On 19 December 1921, No.1 Armoured Car Company RAF (1 ACC) was formally established at Heliopolis and then, having become operational, moved to Palestine in May 1922. They were disbanded there on 1 December 1923 with elements being absorbed into No.2 Armoured Car Company RAF (2 ACC). On 7 April 1922 the remaining airmen under training at RAF Heliopolis were formed into 2 ACC and a month later proceeded to Palestine & Transjordan. In May 1922 airmen and officers assembled at RAF Manston in Kent, England, to train as armoured car crew for service in Mesopotamia (Iraq). On 14 September 1922 they set sail on the first Royal Air Force troopship from Southampton with other RAF personnel bound for Iraq.

== Locations and subsequent history ==
In Iraq, No.3 Armoured Car Company RAF (3 ACC) was based at Basrah operating in Southern Iraq, No.5 Armoured Car Company RAF (5 ACC) at Mosul with No.4 Armoured Car Company RAF (4 ACC), No.6 Armoured Car Company RAF (6 ACC) and a headquarters in Baghdad. Armoured car lines were created at RAF Hinaidi Cantonment.

In 1924 Numbers 3 and 4 Companies were combined. In April 1927 Numbers 4, 5 & 6 Companies were disbanded with the formation of the armoured car wing at RAF Hinaidi Cantonment composed of 8 sections of armoured cars. Four sections were based at Hinaidi, one at Basrah, two at Kirkuk and one at Mosul. In April 1930 the Armoured Car Wing was disbanded and reconstituted as Number 1 Armoured Car Company RAF with headquarters, workshops and two sections based at RAF Hinaidi Cantonment, one section based at RAF Basrah and one at RAF Mosul. In 1937 1 ACC moved from the RAF Hinaidi Cantonment to a new base at RAF Dhibban (renamed RAF Habbaniya on 1 May 1938), where it remained based until disbandment and incorporation into the RAF Regiment, on 3 October 1946.

In Palestine and Transjordan, 2 ACC remained active until disbandment and incorporation into the RAF Regiment, on 3 October 1946.

== Sources ==
- Warwick, Nigel W. M. (2014). IN EVERY PLACE: The RAF Armoured Cars in the Middle East 1921-1953. Rushden, Northamptonshire, England: Forces & Corporate Publishing Ltd. p. 4. ISBN 978-0-9574725-2-5.
