= No. 2 Armoured Car Company RAF =

No. 2 Armoured Car Company
- Active: 1922 - 1946
- Country: United Kingdom
- Branch: Royal Air Force
- Battle honours: see Awards and honours

The Number 2 Armoured Car Company RAF was a military unit of the British Royal Air Force (RAF) that was based at Amman in what was then called the Transjordan. It was the counterpart of No.1 Armoured Car Company RAF, which performed a similar role in Iraq.

== History ==
=== Creation ===
On 7 April 1922, "Number 2 Armoured Car Company RAF" was formed at Heliopolis in the Kingdom of Egypt. The company was placed under the command of Squadron Leader M. Copeman.

=== Pre-war ===
In the pre-war period, the company served in Palestine, on internal security duties, during the unrest from 1936 to 1939. During the Second World War, it was engaged in active service operations in six separate periods of action. It served in the Western Desert on four occasions, was famously part of Habforce during the Iraqi insurgency in the spring of 1941, and followed this up, as part of Kingcol, by taking part in the Campaign in Syria, in the summer of 1941. At the end of the war, it returned to Syria, on garrison duties.

=== Second World War ===
Western Desert: The company served in the Western Desert in the Ground Defence role, protecting the forward landing grounds (LG) of the Desert Air Force, on three occasions. In the winter of 1941–1942, toward the end of a very active year, it guarded the advanced landing strips during the British advance and defended the landing-strip ground-party rearguards when Rommel counter-attacked. On this occasion, both RAF companies were involved. After rest and refit, it was back in the ground defence role when Rommel initiated his offensive, defending the airstrips. The final offensive in Africa began in November 1942, again with both RAF companies involved, and continued across Libya and into Tunisia.

Armoured Reconnaissance unit:

The wartime baptism of fire for the unit, however, was as a unit of the Western Desert Force, patrolling the wire to give warning of the impending Italian invasion. Two sections of the Company joined the similarly-equipped, and very hard-pressed, armoured cavalry regiment, the 11th Hussars. On arrival, in September 1940, the Sections were combined to form a Squadron, which was designated as 'D' Squadron of the Hussars. The RAF cars stayed in this role over the winter of 1940-1941, and took part in the halting of the Italian advance, and the subsequent British counter-attack. The RAF cars were involved in the Battle of Bardia and of Beda Fomm. They provided the screen on the great chase to 'cut the corner' and trap the enemy in Cyrenaica. When the Squadron was finally recalled, in February 1942, it had been operationally active for five months, and had been as far west as El Agheila.

Iraq:

When RAF Habbaniya was besieged during the Anglo-Iraqi War, the Company was performing airfield defence duties in the Western Desert. At Habbaniya, the defenders included the comrades of No.1 Armoured Car Company, RAF. On 5 May 1941, No.2 Armoured Car Company received orders to proceed with all haste to Iraq as part of Habforce and Kingcol, arriving at the oil pumping station H3 on the Palestine / Iraq border, having covered some 1,000 miles in 4 days. They were in advance of Kingcol. Half of the Company, led by the unit commander, Sqn. Ldr. Michael Casano (1913-2006), proceeded into Iraq and captured Rutbah Fort. For his actions during the Revolt, Casano was awarded the Military Cross (MC). The Company was composed of eight Fordson armoured cars. "Fordson" armoured cars were Rolls-Royce armoured cars which received new chassis from a Fordson truck in Egypt. Some of these vehicles with turrets fitted with what appear to be a Boys anti-tank rifle, a machine gun, and twin light machine guns for anti-aircraft defence.

Syria:

Immediately following the Relief of Habbaniya, the battle-hardened Company was kept on, by a desperately over-stretched Middle East Command, for the campaign in Syria.

=== Renaming ===
On 3 October 1946, Number 2 Armoured Car Company RAF was incorporated into the RAF Regiment as 2702 Armoured Car Squadron. On 25 Feb 1947, after pressure by Squadron members and veterans, it was renumbered as Number 2 Armoured Car Squadron. Seven years later, the armoured cars were gone and the unit was named Number 2 (Field) Squadron RAF Regiment. On 1 January 1970, the Squadron title changed again, this time to Number 2 Squadron RAF Regiment.

== Composition ==
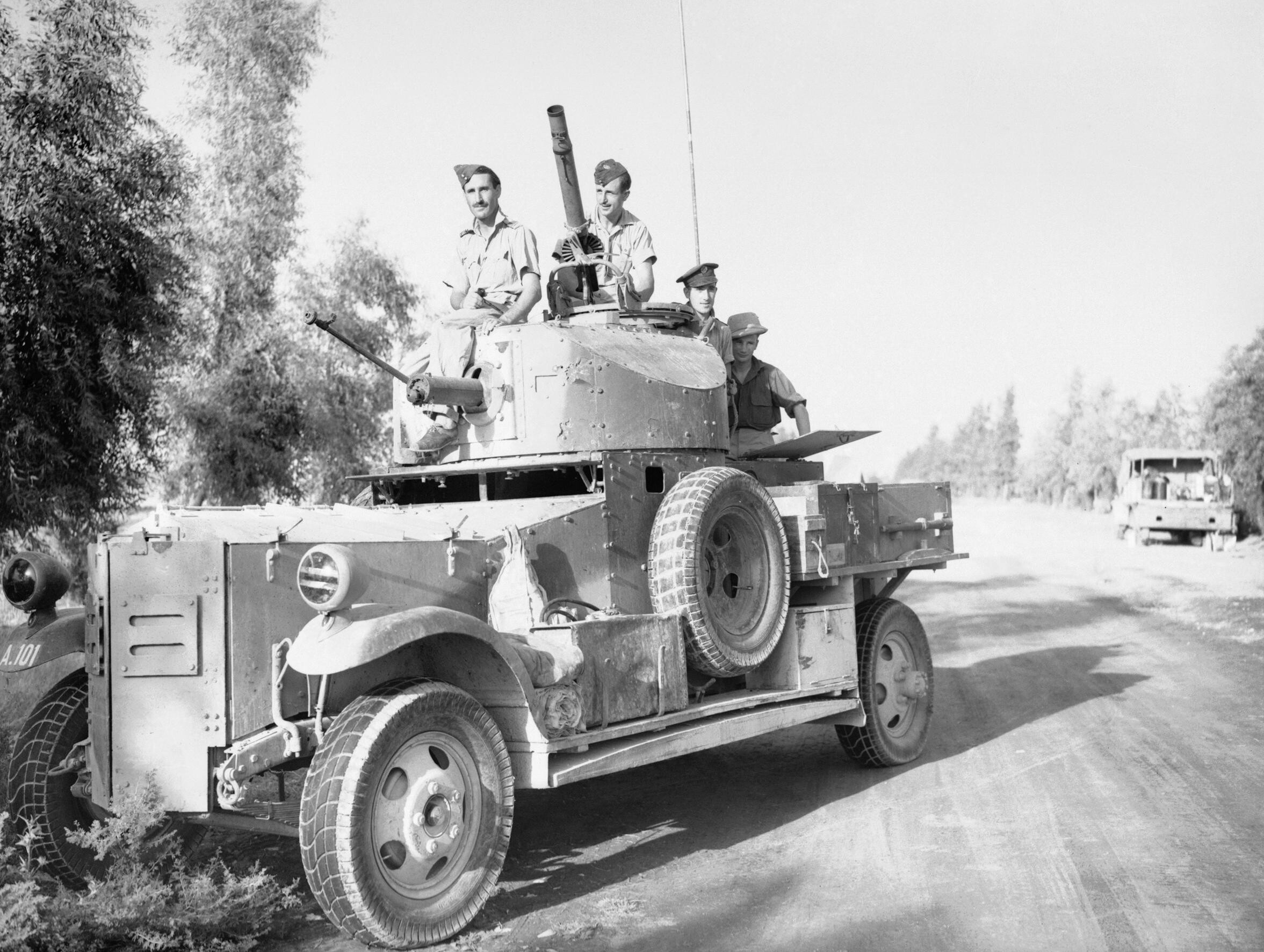
Fordson armoured car waits outside Baghdad while negotiations for an armistice take place between British officials and representatives of the Iraqi rebel government.

The Number 2 Armoured Car Company RAF was equipped with Rolls-Royce Armoured Cars and Morris tenders. These were retained until 1944, although by then Rolls-Royce had long-since ceased production of the Great War-era vehicle, and the Rolls-Royce bodies were fitted onto Fordson chassis.

The unit operated in Sections, each of a half dozen cars. The armament was a Vickers machine gun, mounted in the turret, and twin Brownings, for Anti-Aircraft protection. Fordson armoured cars also appear to have been armed with a Vickers machine gun, a Boys anti-tank rifle and a Lewis gun.

== Awards and honours ==
In 1951 the squadron was awarded a standard or ceremonial flag in recognition of 25 years service. The standard displays the squadron battle honours:

- TRANSJORDAN 1924
- PALESTINE 1936-1939
- EGYPT & LIBYA 1940-1943
- IRAQ 1941
- SYRIA 1941
- EL ALAMEIN NORTH AFRICA 1943

The standard was presented to the squadron on 25 November 1959.

== See also ==
- Royal Naval Air Service
- RAF Iraq Command
- RAF Regiment
- No. 2 Squadron RAF Regiment
- 1941 Iraqi coup d'état
- Iraqforce
- Number 1 Armoured Car Company RAF
