= No. 1 Armoured Car Company RAF =

Military unit

The No.1 Armoured Car Company RAF was a military unit of Britain's Royal Air Force (RAF) that was based in Iraq and played a role in the defence of RAF Habbaniya during World War II.

== Creation ==
On 19 December 1921, "No. 1 Armoured Car Company RAF" was formed at Heliopolis in the Kingdom of Egypt and then moved to Palestine, being disbanded there on 1 December 1923 with elements being absorbed into No. 2 Armoured Car Company RAF. During the 1920s, further RAF Armoured Car Companies (Nos 3, 4, 5 & 6) were formed in Iraq; however, by 1930, they had been consolidated into No. 1 Company with its base at RAF Hinaidi and sections at Mosul and RAF Shaibah.

== Composition and organization ==
During the Anglo-Iraqi War, the No. 1 Armoured Car Company RAF was composed of eighteen Rolls-Royce armoured cars and several Morris tenders. These vehicles were among the last of a consignment of ex-Royal Naval Armoured Car Division armoured cars that had been serving in the Middle East since 1915. In addition to the Rolls-Royce armoured cars, the company had two ancient tanks, named "Walrus" and "Seal".

The company was organised into a headquarters and three sections. Each section had six armoured cars and two wireless tenders. However, the make-up of the company did vary from time to time. Various sections would be detached to other RAF bases in Iraq and on various duties throughout Iraq (and even beyond).

The company was based at RAF Hinaidi Cantonment until it moved to RAF Habbaniya in 1936 (and Hinaidi became the Iraqi Rashid Airbase). RAF Habbaniya had purpose built, modern facilities for both men and machines in the Armoured Car Lines.

== Renaming ==
On 3 October 1946, the company was incorporated into the RAF Regiment as No. 2701 Armoured Squadron. On 25 February 1947, this unit was renamed No. 1 Squadron RAF Regiment.

== See also ==
- Royal Naval Air Service
- RAF Iraq Command
- RAF Habbaniya
- RAF Regiment
- 1941 Iraqi coup d'état
- Iraqforce
