= Rolls-Royce armoured car =

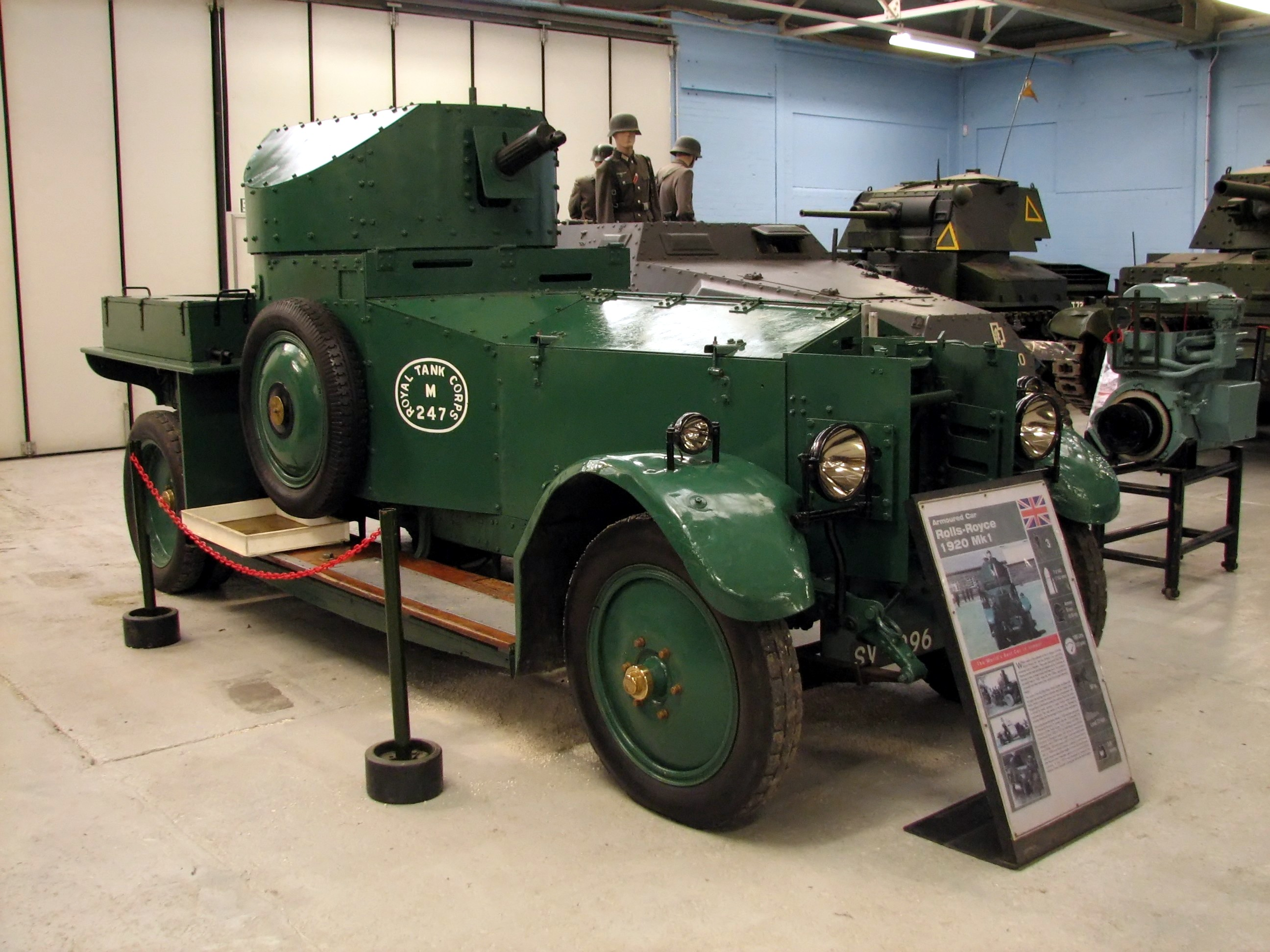
- Rolls Royce 1920 Pattern Mk1 armoured car at The Tank Museum, Bovington
- Type: Armoured car
- Place of origin: United Kingdom

Service history
- In service: 1915–1944
- Wars: First World War; Irish War of Independence; Irish Civil War; Second World War

Production history
- Manufacturer: Rolls-Royce
- No. built: 120 (First World War)
- Variants: Rolls-Royce 1920 Pattern; Rolls-Royce 1924 Pattern; Fordson armoured car; Rolls Royce Indian Pattern

Specifications
- Mass: 4.7 tonnes
- Length: 4.93 m (194 in)
- Width: 1.93 m (76 in)
- Height: 2.54 m (100 in)
- Crew: 3 (commander, driver, and machine-gunner)
- Armor: 12 mm (0.47 in)
- Main armament: .303 (7.7 mm) Vickers machine gun
- Secondary armament: none
- Engine: 6-cylinder petrol, water-cooled 80 hp (60 kW)
- Power/weight: 19 hp/tonne
- Suspension: 4x2 wheel (double rear wheels), leaf spring
- Operational range: 240 km or 150 miles
- Maximum speed: 72 km/h (45 mph)

The Rolls-Royce armoured car is a British armoured car developed in 1914 and used during the First World War, Irish Civil War, the inter-war period in Imperial Air Control in Transjordan, Palestine and Mesopotamia, and in the early stages of the Second World War in the Middle East and North Africa.

== Production history ==
The Royal Naval Air Service (RNAS) raised the first British armoured car squadron during the First World War. In September 1914 all available Rolls-Royce Silver Ghost chassis were requisitioned to form the basis for the new armoured car. The following month a special committee of the Admiralty Air Department, among whom was Flight Commander T. G. Hetherington, designed the superstructure which consisted of armoured bodywork and a single fully rotating turret mounting a regular water-cooled .303 in (7.7 mm) Mk I Vickers machine gun.

The first three vehicles were delivered on 3 December 1914, although by then the mobile period on the Western Front, where the primitive predecessors of the Rolls-Royce cars had served, had already come to an end. Later in the war they served on several fronts of the Middle Eastern theatre. Chassis production was suspended in 1917 to enable Rolls-Royce to concentrate on aero engines.

The vehicle was modernized in 1920 and in 1924, resulting in the Rolls-Royce 1920 Pattern and Rolls-Royce 1924 Pattern. In 1940, 34 vehicles which served in Egypt with the 11th Hussars regiment had the "old" turret replaced with an open-topped unit carrying a .55 (14 mm) Boys anti-tank rifle, .303 in (7.7 mm) Bren light machine gun, and smoke-grenade launchers.

Twenty Rolls-Royce armoured cars in service with No. 2 Armoured Car Company RAF in Egypt and Iraq received new chassis from a Fordson truck and became known as Fordson armoured cars. Photographs show them as equipped with what appear to be turrets fitted with a Boys anti-tank rifle, a machine gun and twin light machine guns for anti-aircraft defence.

In addition to RNAS and Tank Corps-supplied armoured cars, the RAF had Rolls-Royces built to equip its armoured car companies. This was done independently of the War Office. They were designated Car, Armoured, Rolls-Royce Type A. Shaped like the 1914 RNAS car, they were fitted with the 1920 turret.

== Combat history ==
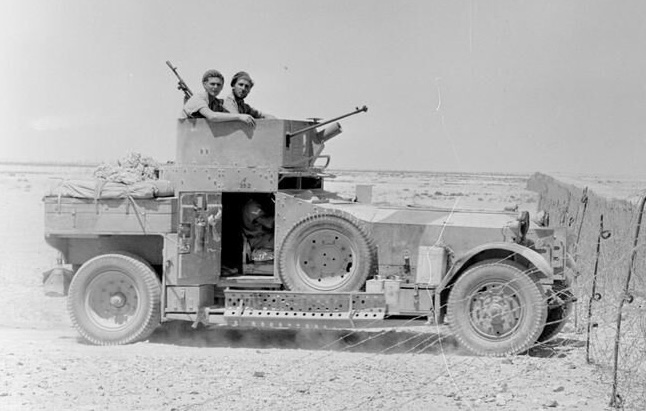
A 1924 Pattern Rolls-Royce armoured car with a "new" open-topped turret in the Bardia area of the Western Desert, 1940.

Six RNAS Rolls-Royce squadrons were formed of 12 vehicles each: one went to France; one to Africa to fight in the German colonies and in April 1915 two went to Gallipoli. From August 1915 onwards these were all disbanded and the materiel handed over to the Army which used them in the Light Armoured Motor Batteries of the Machine Gun Corps. The armoured cars were poorly suited to the muddy trench filled battlefields of the Western Front, but were able to operate in the Near East, so the squadron from France went to Egypt.

Lawrence of Arabia used a squadron in his operations against the Turkish forces. He called the unit of nine armoured Rolls-Royces "more valuable than rubies" in helping win his Revolt in the Desert. This impression would last with him the rest of his life; when asked by a journalist what he thought would be the thing he would most value he said "I should like my own Rolls-Royce car with enough tyres and petrol to last me all my life".

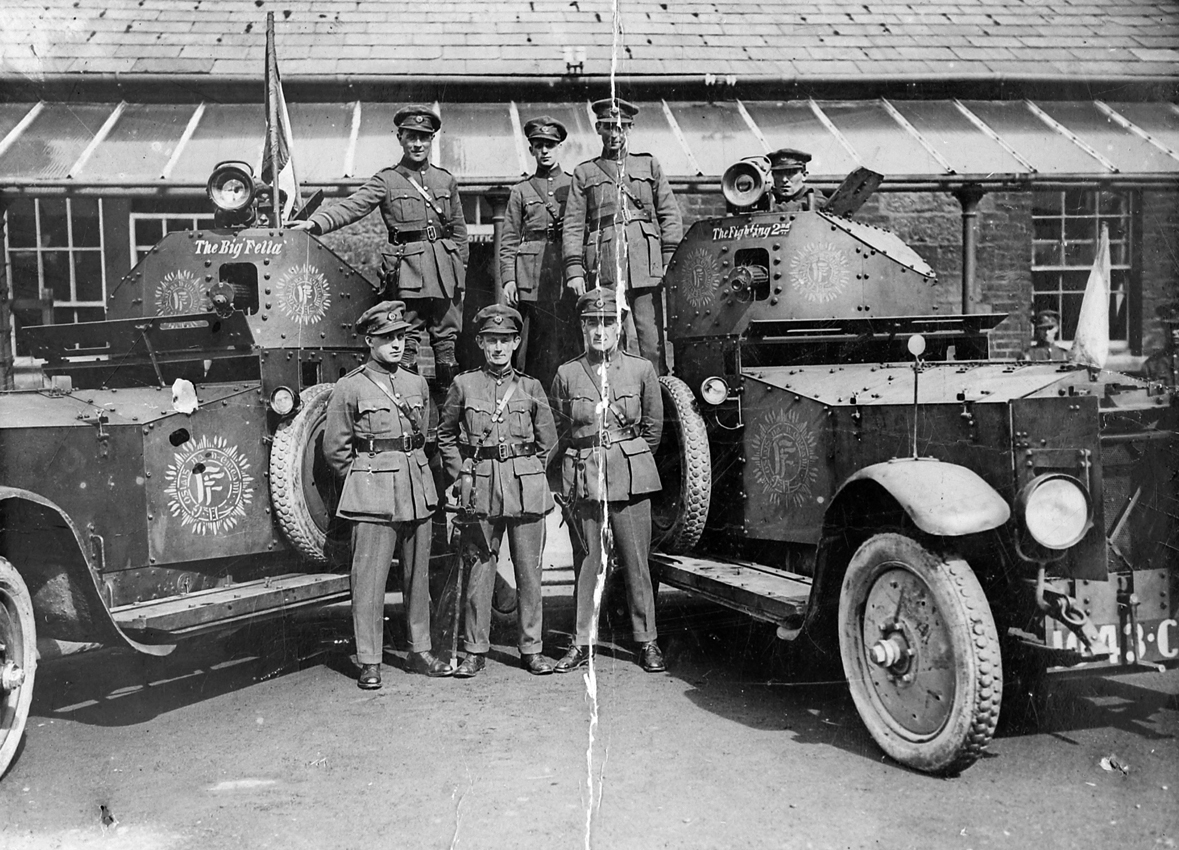
Two of the 13 Rolls-Royce armoured cars used during the Irish Civil War: The Fighting 2nd (ARR3) and The Big Fella (ARR8)

In the Irish Civil War (1922–1923), 13 Rolls-Royce armoured cars were sold to the Irish Free State government by the British government to fight the Irish Republican Army. They were a major advantage to the Free State in street fighting and in protecting convoys against guerrilla attacks and played a vital role in the retaking of Cork and Waterford. Despite continued maintenance problems and poor reaction to Irish weather, they continued in service until 1944, being withdrawn once new tyres became unobtainable. Twelve of the Irish Army examples were stripped and sold in 1954.

At the outbreak of the Second World War, 76 vehicles were in service. They were used in operations in the Western Desert, in Iraq, and in Syria. By the end of 1941, they were withdrawn from frontline service as modern designs became available. Some Indian Pattern cars saw use in the Indian subcontinent and Burma.

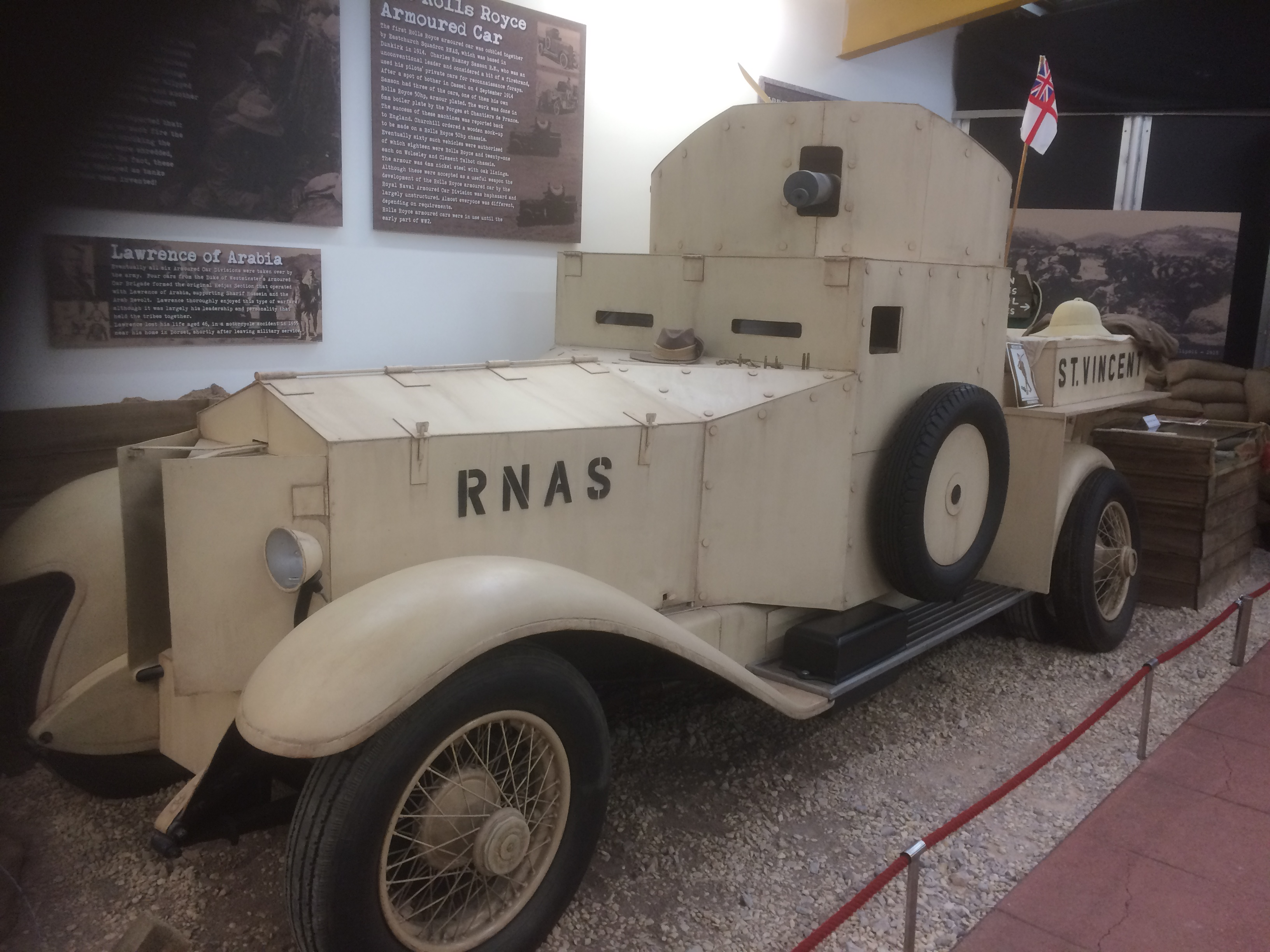
A replica Rolls Royce armoured car on display at the Haynes Motor Museum.

== Variants ==
- 1920 Pattern Mk I – thicker radiator armour and new wheels.
- 1920 Pattern Mk IA – commander's cupola.
- 1924 Pattern Mk I – turret with commander's cupola.
- 1921 Indian Pattern – based on the 1920 Pattern. Had extended hull armour to provide extra space and a domed turret with four ball mounts for machine guns.
- Fordson – based on a 1914 Pattern. Some vehicles in Egypt received new chassis from Fordson trucks.

A single experimental vehicle had the turret removed and replaced by a one-pounder automatic anti-aircraft gun on an open mounting. Some cars had Maxim machine guns instead of the Vickers gun.

== Survivors ==
- ARR-2, Sliabh na mBan, 1920 Pattern Rolls-Royce was retained by the Irish Army and is generally accepted to be the car that was accompanying the Commander-in-Chief of the National Army, General Michael Collins, on the day he was killed. It is the world's oldest serving armoured vehicle and one of only two original Rolls-Royce armoured cars still running today. It is regularly aired during parades and open days, often being driven under its own power. It has recently undergone a complete refurbishment, which involved a complete strip down and rebuild. It is maintained by the Irish Defence Forces Cavalry Corps in the Curragh Camp.
- A Rolls-Royce 1920 Pattern Mark I is on display at The Tank Museum in Bovington, England. The vehicle is displayed in the museum's inter-war years gallery. David Wiley, curator of the museum, called it "one of the best exhibits we have"
- One of the 12 sold (ARR-1 Danny Boy/Tom Keogh) survives with a collector in England. This vehicle carries replica bodywork.
- A 1920 pattern Rolls-Royce armoured car is displayed in sand colour at the RAF Regiment Heritage Centre at RAF Honington. It had previously been on display at the RAF Museum at Hendon. The armour is a facsimile of the original, built on an original Rolls-Royce chassis in the 1960s.
- A Rolls-Royce armoured car replica is on display at Eaton Hall, Cheshire, home of the Duke of Westminster, and can be viewed at charity open days of the Hall.
- A Rolls-Royce 1921 Indian Pattern is on display at Cavalry Tank Museum at Ahmednagar, India.
- Haynes Motor Museum has a 1914 pattern Rolls-Royce with replica bodywork, restored to resemble the Desert Rolls that accompanied Lawrence of Arabia.

== See also ==
- Number 1 Armoured Car Company RAF
- Number 2 Armoured Car Company RAF
- RAF Regiment
