= RAF Hinaidi =

Former Royal Air Force station near Baghdad

Coordinates: 33°17′14.59″N 44°28′31.85″E

RAF Hinaidi
- Baghdad in Iraq
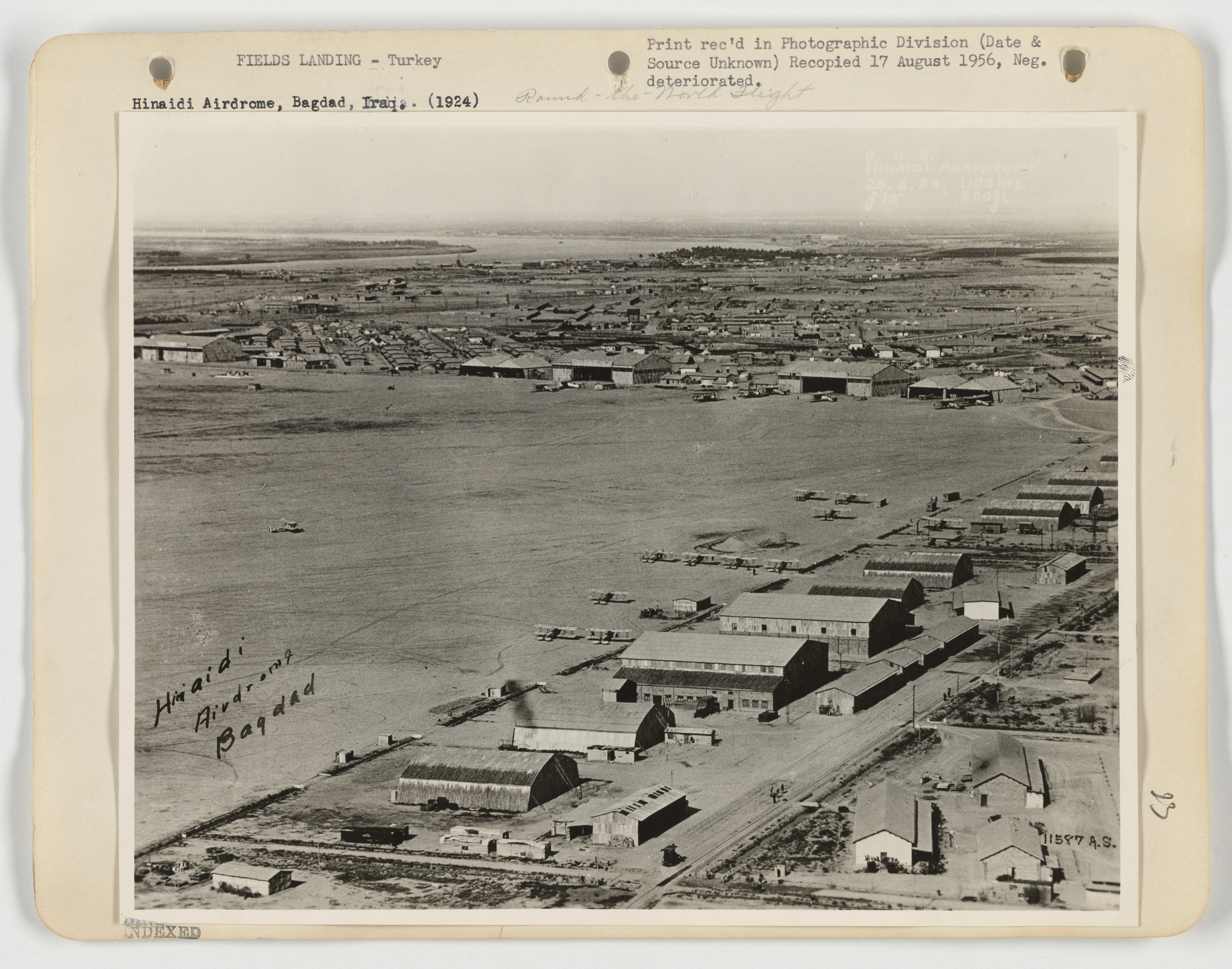
- RAF Hinaidi in 1924

Site information
- Owner: Air Ministry
- Operator: Royal Air Force; Royal Iraqi Air Force

Location
- Shown within Iraq

Site history
- Built: 1922
- In use: 1922 - 1937

Royal Air Force Hinaidi or more commonly known as RAF Hinaidi (or Hinaidi Cantonment), is a former Royal Air Force station near Baghdad in the Kingdom of Iraq. It was operational from 1922 until 1937, when operations were transferred to RAF Habbaniya.

== History ==
Hinaidi Cantonment was developed after the First World War as an Army barracks and as the main British airfield, taking over from Baghdad West airfield. The Cantonment passed from British Army Command to the Royal Air Force in 1922 when the Royal Air Force took over garrison duties in Iraq as a result of the Cairo Conference. There were extensive barracks, recreational facilities, a large hospital, Air Headquarters (AHQ), communication facilities, maintenance units, aeroplane squadron hangars, RAF Armoured Car Company lines, RAF Iraq Levies lines and a civil cantonment..

300 British personnel (197 RAF, 72 British Army, 2 Royal Navy, 28 RAF Civilian Contractors and 1 baby girl) still lie buried in the Hinaidi RAF Peace Cemetery (renamed the Ma’Asker Al Raschid RAF Cemetery in 1964), on land owned by the British Ministry of Defence and officially maintained by the Commonwealth War Graves Commission.. The cemetery was found to be derelict in 2018 but after extensive lobbying, the CWGC erected a new wall around the cemetery in late 2021.. Complete restoration of the cemetery is intended at some point in the future, though the CWGC/MoD have yet to secure funding or provide a schedule for the project. It has been considered that erecting a single memorial might suit as an interim solution..

At present there are only 77 complete or partial original headstones scattered around on the cemetery grounds, though there is every indication from shallow excavations carried out in 2022 that none of the 300 graves have been disturbed..

In Clause 1 of the "Annexure to Treaty of Alliance" section of the Anglo-Iraqi Treaty of 1930, maintaining a force at Hinaidi was indicated to be permitted for a period of "five years after the entry into force of this Treaty." This time was provided "in order to enable His Majesty the King of 'Iraq to organise the necessary forces to replace them."

RAF Dhibban (renamed RAF Habbaniya in 1938) was built to replace Hinaidi and the RAF began to move there in 1936. The final evacuation of British Forces from Hinaidi took place on 21 December 1937 and the handover of the entire cantonment to the Iraqi Government was completed on 17 January 1938. The Royal Iraqi Air Force had a presence on the airfield from at least 1933 and upon complete handover it became a major Royal Iraqi Air Force base.

During the 1941 Iraqi coup d'état, the airfield was renamed "Rashid Airfield" by the Iraqis in honour of Rashid Ali, former Iraqi Prime Minister and the leader of the coup. During the Anglo-Iraqi War in May 1941, the airfield was bombed and strafed by the British Royal Air Force, damaging and destroying Iraqi aircraft.

== Flying Units and Aircraft ==
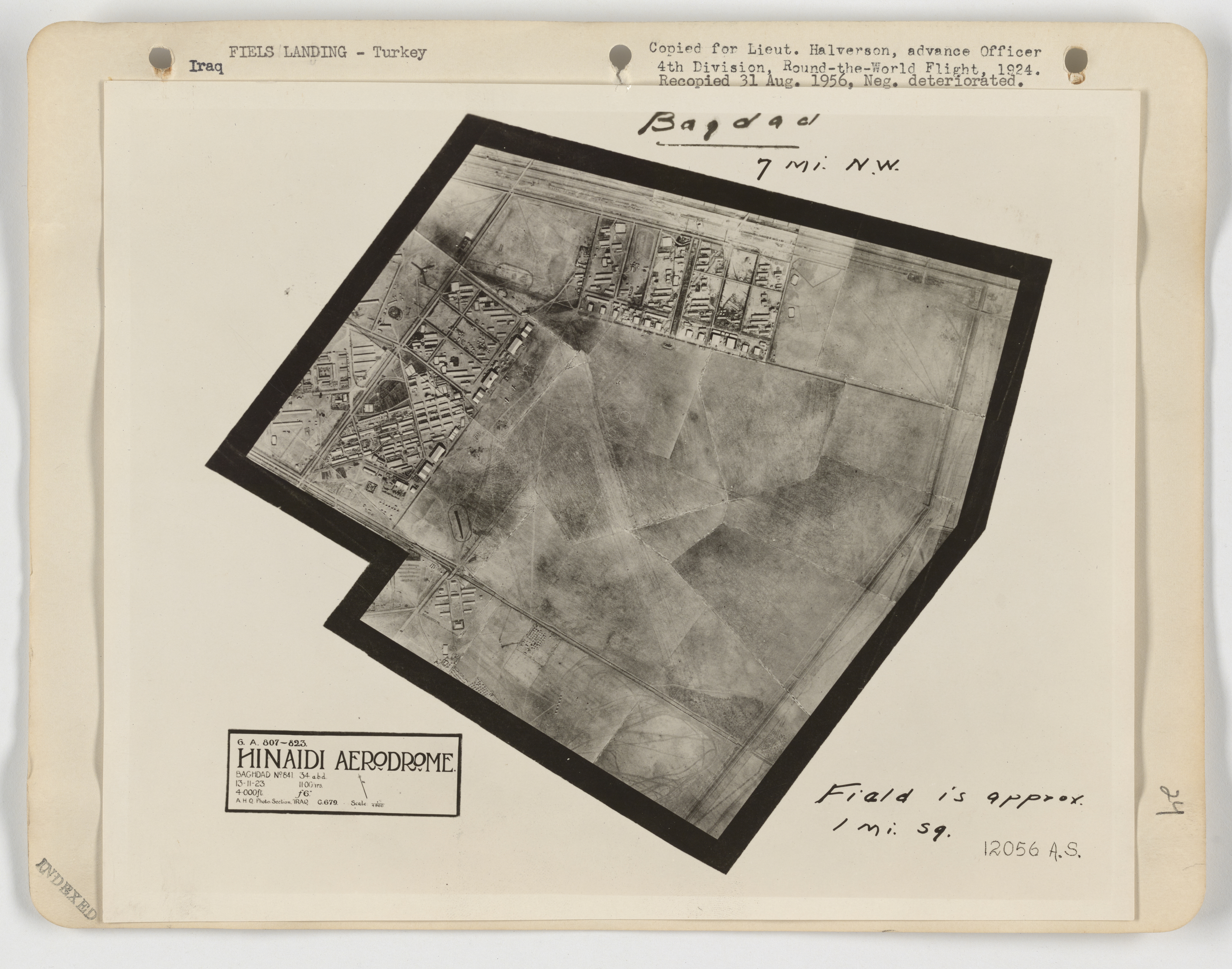
RAF Hinaidi

- No. 1 Squadron RAF (1921–26) Sopwith Snipe Nighthawk
- No. 6 Squadron RAF (1922-24 & 1926-29) Bristol F2b Fighter
- No. 8 Squadron RAF (1921-27) de Havilland Airco DH.9A
- No. 30 Squadron RAF (1922-29) de Havilland Airco DH.9A Westland Wapiti
- No. 45 Squadron RAF (1922-27) Vickers Vernon
- No. 55 Squadron RAF (1924–37) de Havilland Airco DH.9A Westland Wapiti Vickers Vincent
- No. 70 Squadron RAF (1922-37) Vickers Vernon Vickers Victoria Vickers Valentia

The squadrons were also detached to other airfields during their time at Hinaidi.

Units

- Aircraft Depot, Iraq (1929-37)
- Aircraft Park, Iraq (1918-22)
- Iraq Aircraft Depot (1922-29) became Air Depot Iraq (1929-37)
- Hinaidi Station Flight
- Air Headquarters Iraq (1938)
- Iraq Command (1928-38)
- Communication Flight Iraq and Persia (1930-38)

== Units ==
- RAF Armoured Car Companies, various Companies, Sections and Wing Headquarters (1922-1936).

== See also ==
- List of former Royal Air Force stations
- Handley Page Hinaidi
