= Battle of Palmyra (1941) =

Battle in Syria during the Syria-Lebanon campaign in World War II

- Part of the Syria–Lebanon campaign of World War II
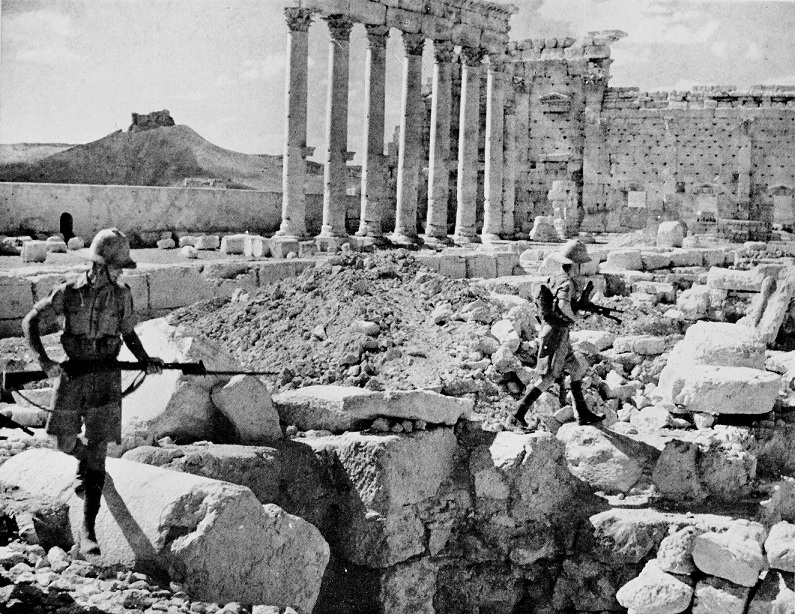
- British troops in Palmyra after the battle
Date	21 June – 2 July 1941
Location	Palmyra, Mandatory Syria 34°33′N 38°17′E
Result	British-Jordanian victory

Belligerents
United Kingdom: (Jordan) Transjordan	Vichy France: French Syria; French Lebanon

Commanders and leaders
(United Kingdom) John Clark	(Vichy France) Ghérardi

Strength
1,000 troops	300 troops

Casualties and losses
85 killed	135 killed 165 captured

The Battle of Palmyra was part of the Allied invasion of Syria during the Syria-Lebanon campaign in World War II, that took place from 21 June to 2 July 1941. British mechanised cavalry and an Arab Legion desert patrol broke up a Vichy French mobile column northeast of the city of Palmyra, provoked by the Vichy garrison's surrender.

== Background ==
In 1941, the Vichy French had substantial forces in the region and had allowed their air bases to be used as staging posts by the Germans to send aircraft to take part in the Anglo-Iraqi War. They had also allowed the Germans to use the railway system to send arms and ammunition to Iraq. On 8 June 1941, the Allies had launched two northerly attacks from Palestine and Trans-Jordan into Lebanon and Syria to prevent any further interference with Allied interests in the region. By late June, Damascus had been taken, and the Allied campaign commander, Henry Maitland Wilson, was ready to launch two further thrusts, this time from western Iraq to complete the capture of Syria.

An expanded Brigade group called Habforce had, during the Anglo-Iraqi war, advanced across the desert from Trans-Jordan to relieve the British garrison at RAF Habbaniya on the Euphrates River and had then assisted in the taking of Baghdad. This force was now pulled back to the remote part of Iraq near the Trans-Jordan and Syrian borders. It was tasked with advancing northwest to defeat the Vichy French garrison at Palmyra and secure the oil pipeline from Haditha in Iraq to Tripoli on the Lebanese coast. Habforce was well-suited to the task in the desert because of the inclusion in its strength of the battalion-sized Arab Legion Mechanised Regiment, which was made up exclusively of desert-dwelling Bedouin soldiers.

In Palmyra, the core of the French defense was Fort Weygand, located northeast of the ancient ruins. Other posts were placed in the oasis, the ancient city, the hills and the castle. The area was defended by the 187 legionnaires of the 15th company of the 6th Foreign Infantry Regiment, Bedouins of the 1st light company of the desert, and some air force crawlers. In total, these forces brought together about 300 men under the command of Commander Ghérardi.

On the other hand, the British mobilized a thousand men in battle, commanded by Major-General John Clark. These troops were part of the column of Brigadier James Joseph Kingstone of the Habforce and included the 4th Cavalry Brigade, elements of the Arab Legion of John Bagot Glubb, known as "Glubb Pasha", and the 1st Infantry Battalion of the Regiment of Essex.

== The Palmyra actions ==
Map of Syria and Lebanon during World War II

Habforce split into three columns (two to make flanking manoeuvres on each side of Palmyra). A detachment from the Arab Legion guided each one; they set off on 21 June. A skirmish with pillboxes on the pipeline, a few miles east of Palmyra, resulted in the element of surprise being lost. Habforce surrounded Palmyra, sending the Arab Legion troops out on wide-ranging desert patrols to protect Habforce's flanks and lines of communication. On 28 June, they captured the French fort of Seba' Biyar (roughly 60 miles south-west of Palmyra), with the small garrison surrendering without firing a shot. The next day, they occupied Sukhna, some 40 miles north-east of Palmyra, which was not occupied by French troops.

On the morning of 1 July, Sukhna was attacked by the Vichy 2nd Light Desert Company. The Arab Legion occupiers had been reinforced by a squadron from the 4th Cavalry Brigade's Household Cavalry Regiment. After a sharp battle, the French retreated before an enthusiastic charge by Arab Legion troopers and ended up trapped in a sandy box valley before surrendering. The Arab Legion suffered two casualties, while the French had eleven casualties and eighty prisoners. Whilst hardly the war's largest battle, its effect was to cause the 3rd Light Desert Company, which was garrisoning Palmyra, to lose heart and surrender on the night of 2 July.

== Aftermath ==
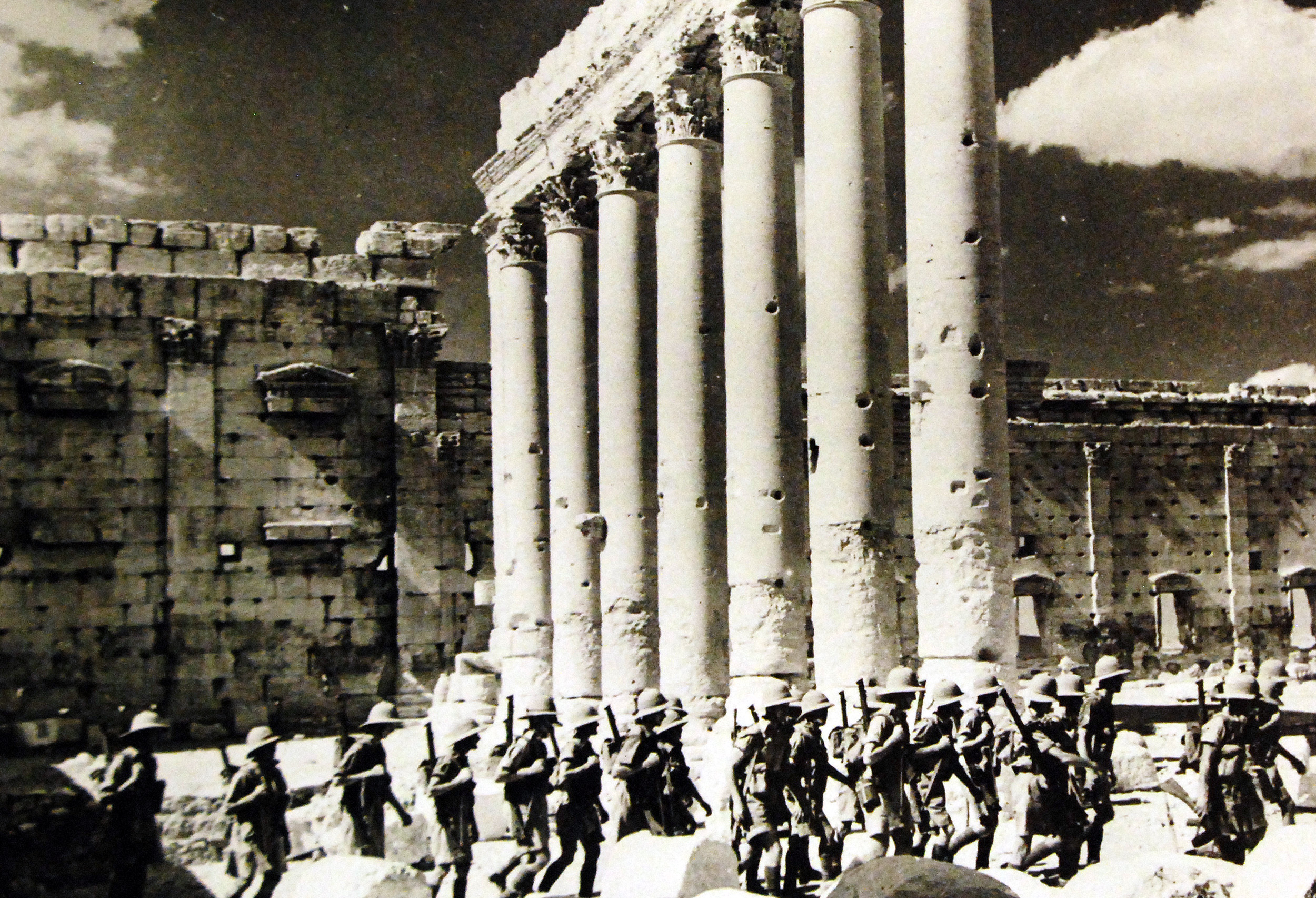
British soldiers in the ruins of Palmyra.

The capture of Palmyra freed Habforce to move 40 miles west along the pipeline to Homs and threaten the communications of the Vichy forces fighting the Australian 7th Division on the Lebanese coast.

For the Arab Legion, the victory had a tremendous effect. News spread quickly, and thousands of Bedouins volunteered for the Mechanized Regiment. Glubb wrote later, 'Our little campaign in Iraq and Palmyra had invested the Arab Legion with a halo of glory.'

== See also ==
- Habforce order of battle as part of Iraqforce
