= George Clark (British Army officer) =

British Army general (1892–1948)

Lieutenant-General George Clark CB MC*
- Born: John George Walters Clark; 2 May 1892; Wokingham, Berkshire, England
- Died: 16 May 1948 (aged 56); St Marylebone, London, England
- Military career
- Allegiance: United Kingdom
- Branch: British Army
- Service years: 1911–1946
- Rank: Lieutenant-General
- Service number: 15708
- Unit: 16th The Queen's Lancers
- Commands: Lines of Communications Allied Forces Headquarters, Tunisia (1942–1943); 10th Armoured Division (1941–1942); 1st Cavalry Division (1939–1941); 12th Infantry Brigade (1938–1939); 16th/5th Lancers (1933–1936)
- Conflicts: First World War; Second World War
- Awards: Companion of the Order of the Bath; Military Cross & Bar; Mentioned in Despatches (5); Commander of the Legion of Merit (United States); Officer of the Order of Orange-Nassau with Swords (Netherlands); Legion of Honour (France); Croix de Guerre (France); Grand Officer of the Order of Glory (Tunisia)

Lieutenant-General John George Walters Clark, CB, MC & Bar (2 May 1892 – 16 May 1948) was a senior British Army officer who fought in both the First and Second World Wars. During the latter he commanded the 10th Armoured Division, formerly the 1st Cavalry Division.

== Early life and career ==
Clark was educated at Winchester College (1906–1910). After passing out from the Royal Military College, Sandhurst, he was commissioned into the 16th The Queen's Lancers in September 1911 and fought with them during the First World War. He was twice mentioned in dispatches, and was awarded the Military Cross and Bar: the first award in June 1917 and the Bar in 1918. The citation for the Bar, which was published in The London Gazette, stated:

For conspicuous gallantry and devotion to duty. When all communication with the forward units of the division had broken down during an engagement, he established communication over unknown ground and enabled control to be maintained. On another occasion, when both flanks of the division had been turned and the situation was very obscure, he went forward with orders to the advanced troops. Later, he was largely responsible for a successful withdrawal being carried out in good order. He showed great initiative and resource.

— London Gazette, 22 June 1918

== Second World War ==
Between the wars Clark attended the Staff College, Camberley from 1926 to 1927, and later returned there as an instructor from 1929 to 1932, and, by the time of the Second World War, he was commanding the 12th Infantry Brigade. From October 1939 to July 1942, Clark commanded the 1st Cavalry Division (re-designated 10th Armoured Division in 1941) as General Officer Commanding (GOC) based in British Mandate of Palestine (Palestine and Trans-Jordan).

In May 1941, Clark formed and commanded Habforce (which when in Iraq became part of Iraqforce), which crossed the desert from Trans-Jordan to relieve RAF Habbaniya during the Anglo-Iraqi War. When Kingcol, the flying column of Habforce, arrived the airfield garrison had already forced the threatening Iraqi force to retire. With the arrival of Kingcol the garrison drove on to capture Falluja and Kingcol then exploited this to advance on Baghdad, arriving on 29 May. The Iraq government capitulated two days later. Habforce was also involved in the Syria-Lebanon campaign, advancing from eastern Iraq to capture Palmyra on 3 July to secure the Haditha – Palmyra oil pipeline. For his services, Clark was appointed a Companion of the Order of the Bath.

In August 1941, the 1st Cavalry Division was reorganised as the 10th Armoured Division. Clark remained in command until April 1942 so missing the division's active service at Alam Halfa and Second Battle of El Alamein. He became GOC Lines of Communication in Tunisia and thereafter Deputy Governor of Sicily after its capture in 1943. At the end of 1943 he briefly became Major-General Administration at GHQ Middle East in Cairo before becoming Chief Administrative Officer at Allied Forces Headquarters (AFHQ) for which he held the acting rank of lieutenant general.

In late 1944 Clark became head of the Supreme Headquarters Allied Expeditionary Force (SHAEF) mission to the Netherlands. His most notable activity was to prepare food dumps in liberated territory for supply to starving Dutch people as they became liberated following the Hunger Winter of 1944. For this work the Netherlands government made him an Officer of the Order of Orange Nassau with Swords, and he was awarded the Legion of Honour and the Croix de Guerre from the French government. He was also thrice Mentioned in Despatches during the Second World War, and was appointed a Grand Officer of the Tunisian Order of Glory.

== Retirement ==
Clark retired from the army in 1946 as an honorary lieutenant general with the substantive rank of major general. He was awarded the United States' Legion of Merit, in the grade of Commander in 1947, having already been given the award in the order of Officer in 1943.

== Bibliography ==
- Mackenzie, Compton (1951). Eastern Epic. London: Chatto & Windus. OCLC 1412578.
- Mead, Richard (2007). Churchill's Lions: a biographical guide to the key British generals of World War II. Stroud (UK): Spellmount. ISBN 978-1-86227-431-0.
- Smart, Nick (2005). Biographical Dictionary of British Generals of the Second World War. Barnesley: Pen & Sword. ISBN 1844150496.
- "Orders of Battle.com". Archived from the original on 17 July 2007.

Military offices
New command	GOC 1st Cavalry Division; 1939–1941	Post redesignated 10th Armoured Division
New command	GOC 10th Armoured Division; 1941–1942	Succeeded by Alexander Gatehouse
