= Mercol =

British Army flying column

Mercol was a flying column created by the British Army shortly after the Anglo-Iraqi War had ended.

== Creation and composition ==
Mercol was a truck-borne flying column created in early June 1941 to round up irregular troops under Fawzi al-Qawuqji. Named after its commander, Major E. J. H. Merry, the column comprised A Squadron of the Household Cavalry Regiment, two Royal Air Force Rolls-Royce Armoured Cars and two antique 18-pounder field guns from the Habbaniya arsenal. Merry and his command carried enough fuel, rations and water for one week.

In addition to Mercol, two other columns were created in early July; Gocol, commanded by Major R. E. S. Gooch, with the task of capturing Dr. Fritz Grobba, the German Ambassador to the Kingdom of Iraq and Harcol, under Major R. J. Hardy, with the task of securing Kirkuk.

== See also ==
- Iraqforce
- Habforce
- Kingcol
- Gocol
- Harcol
- 4th Cavalry Brigade
- Flying Column
