= Gocol =

Gocol was a flying column created by the British Army shortly after the Anglo–Iraqi War had ended.

== Creation and composition ==
Gocol was a truck-borne flying column created in early June 1941, to pursue and capture Dr. Fritz Grobba, the German Ambassador to the Kingdom of Iraq. Grobba went on the run after the collapse of the pro-German Rashid Ali government, to flee Iraq and get to Nazi occupied Europe. Two other columns were created in early July, Mercol, commanded by Major E. J. H. Merry, to round up irregular troops under Fawzi al-Qawuqji and Harcol, under Major R. J. Hardy, with the task of securing Kirkuk.

Gocol was named after its commander, Major R. E. S. Gooch and comprised B Squadron of the Household Cavalry Regiment, six Royal Air Force armoured cars, two 3.7 inch mountain howitzers and Royal Army Service Corps (RASC) transport.

== Operations ==
On 3 June 1941, travelling from Habbaniya by road, Gocol reached Mosul but Dr. Grobba had gone. On the same day, two companies of the 2nd Battalion of the 4th Prince of Wales's Own Gurkha Rifles arrived by air from Habbaniya with a detachment of the RAF. The remainder of the 2nd Battalion reached Mosul by air next day. In addition to Gocol and the air lifted forces, the 1st Battalion of the King's Own Royal Regiment (Lancaster) left Baghdad on 2 June and arrived in Mosul by road on 3 June.

Gocol drove west from Mosul and illegally entered Vichy French territory just prior to the commencement of the Syria–Lebanon Campaign, which started in the early hours of 8 June. During the week following 7 June, Gocol made every effort to capture Grobba. The column entered Qamishli in Syria fully expecting to capture him there but Grobba had again left in time. In the end, Grobba escaped, Gocol having been a failure.

== See also ==
- Iraqforce
- Habforce
- Kingcol
- Mercol
- Harcol
- 4th Cavalry Brigade
- Flying column
