= Household Cavalry Regiment =

The Household Cavalry Regiment
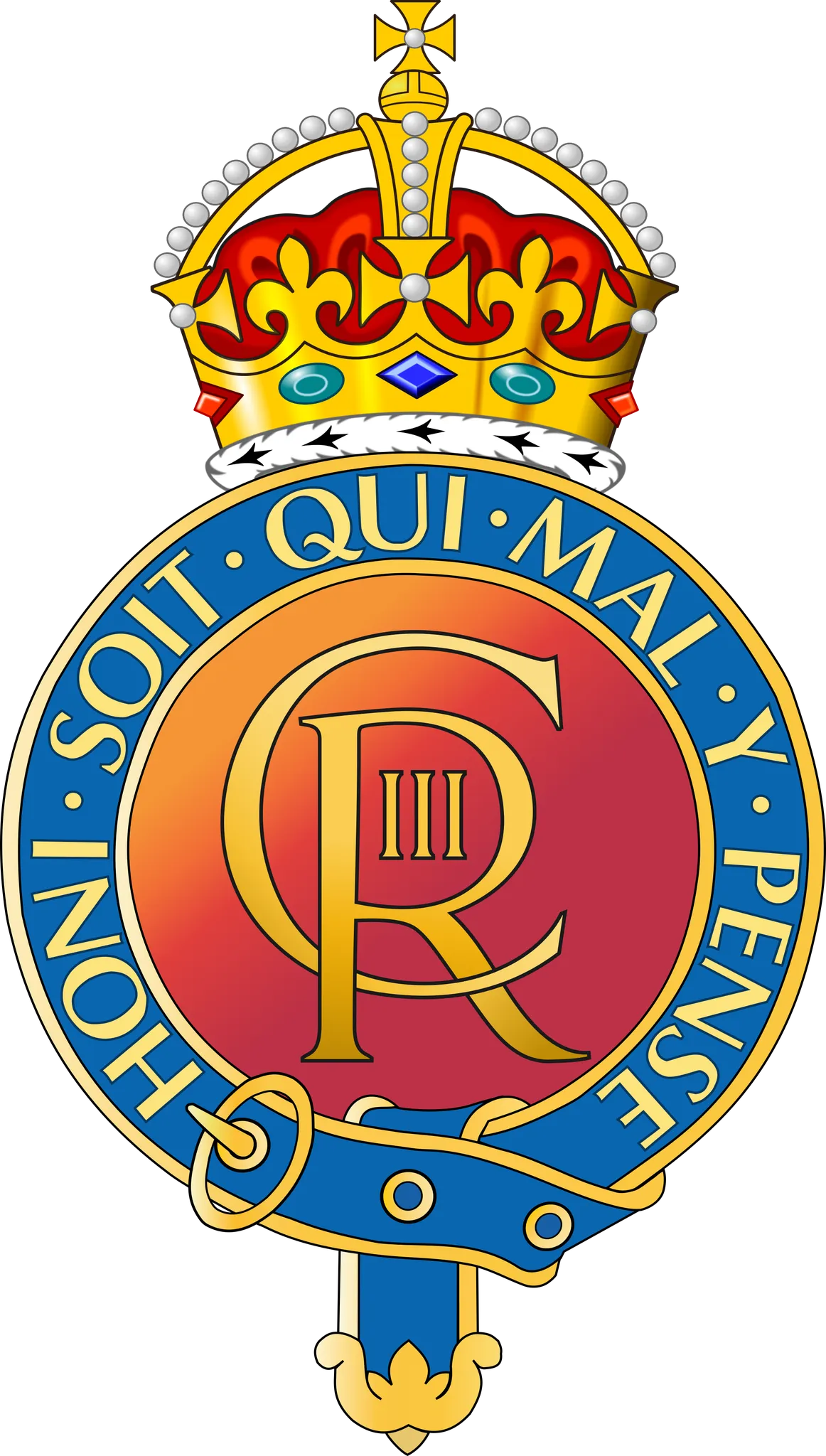
- Badge of the Household Cavalry
- Active: 19 October 1992 – present
- Country: United Kingdom
- Branch: British Army
- Type: Horse guards
- Role: Armoured cavalry regiment
- Size: One regiment
- Part of: Household Cavalry
- Garrison/HQ: Powle Lines, Bulford Camp, Wiltshire
- Mottos: Honi soit qui mal y pense (Middle French for 'Shame on him who thinks evil of it')
- March: Life Guards: Quick – Millanollo; Slow – Life Guards Slow March; Trot past – Keel Row; Blues and Royals: Quick – Quick March of the Blues and Royals; Slow – Slow March of the Blues and Royals; Trot past – Keel Row
- Equipment: Warrior; Ajax

Commanders
- Current commander: Lt Col Alex Howard
- Colonel-in-Chief: Charles III

Insignia
- Tactical Recognition Flash

The Household Cavalry Regiment (HCR) is an Armoured Cavalry regiment of the British Army based in Bulford Camp in Wiltshire. It is the brother regiment of the Household Cavalry Mounted Regiment (HCMR) based at Hyde Park Barracks in London - both regiments together form the Household Cavalry (HCav). The Household Cavalry Regiment was formed in 1992, under the Options for Change reforms, by the union of the Life Guards and the Blues and Royals in order to preserve the distinct identities of the regiments. A precedent for the Household Cavalry Regiment has previously been set by the Household Cavalry Composite Regiment - active during the Anglo-Egyptian War, the Second Boer War and latterly during both the First and Second World Wars.

The HCR is part of the Household Cavalry, rather than the Royal Armoured Corps (RAC), which encompasses all other armoured and cavalry regiments of the British Army.

== History ==
The Household Cavalry Regiment was established as part of the Options for Change defence review in 1992.

=== Former Yugoslavia ===
The House Cavalry Regiment's squadrons served in the Yugoslav Wars on rotations over a nine-year period. Deployments to the Former Republic of Yugoslavia included tours by A and D Squadrons in 1995 and C Squadron in 1999 and 2003. They were largely based at Banja Luka, headquarters of the Multi-National Division (South-West), for which the British Armed Forces were responsible. In 1997 two squadrons from the regiment were awarded the Wilkinson Sword of Peace for their work in "returning the lives of members of the severely damaged community of Banja Luka to conditions approaching normality, in which the seeds of long-standing peace might grow." In 1999 D Squadron provided the brigade reconnaissance squadron for 4th Armoured Brigade for the occupation of Kosovo on Operation Agricola 1.

=== Fire Brigades Union strike ===
In 2002, Household Cavalry Regiment soldiers crewed fire appliances during the Fire Brigades Union strike. In 2003, exceptionally, the regiment was tasked at short notice to provide additional armed security at Heathrow Airport, in response to a specific threat.

=== Iraq ===
D Squadron deployed in their function as the Formation Reconnaissance Squadron for 16 Air Assault Brigade during the 2003 invasion of Iraq. The squadron led the brigade main body into Iraq before conducting a wide range of tasks, including around the Rumalayah oil fields. The squadron was unfortunate to be involved in a friendly-fire incident involving a US A-10 Thunderbolt. Lance Corporal of Horse Matty Hull was killed in the incident. In a separate incident, Lieutenant Alex Tweedie and Lance Corporal Karl Shearer died when their Scimitar over-turned into an irrigation canal. The squadron received various decorations for its service: Trooper Chris Finney was awarded the George Cross for his actions during the A-10 incident, Major Richard Taylor received the Distinguished Service Order, Corporal of Horse Mick Flynn received the Conspicuous Gallantry Cross for his actions in a battle with Iraqi armour, and Corporal of Horse Glynn Bell was awarded the Military Cross for his actions shortly before the end of the tour. In April 2004, A and C Squadrons deployed during Operation Telic 4 and in June 2007, A and C Squadrons again returned to Iraq during Operation Telic 10.

=== Afghanistan ===
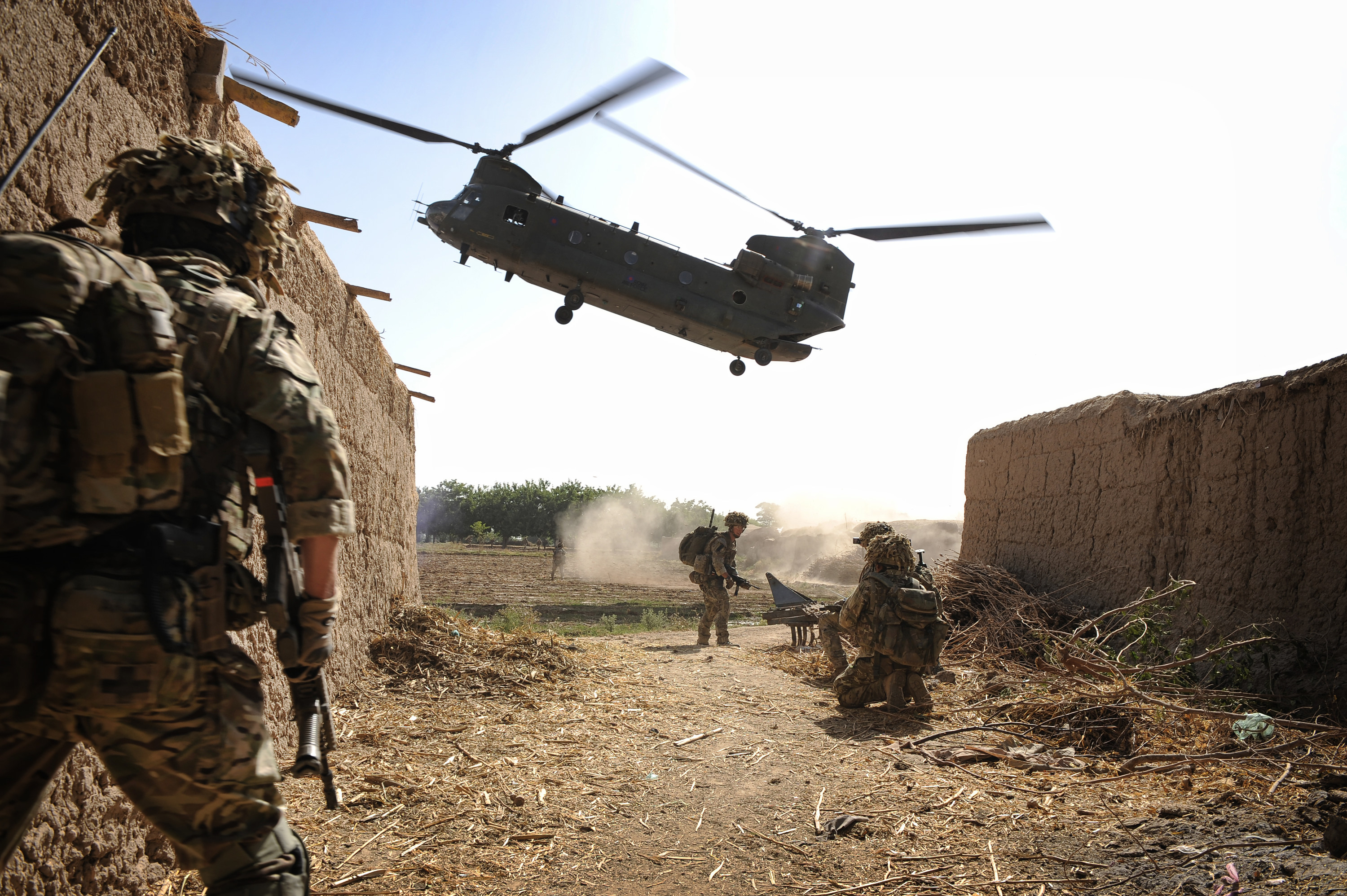
HCR soldiers move to their exfiltration HLS at the end of a search operation during their deployment to Helmand Province, Afghanistan in 2013 during Op Herrick 18.

During Operation Herrick 4, D Squadron deployed as the Formation Reconnaissance Squadron for 16 Air Assault Brigade in April 2006. C Squadron deployed with 52nd Infantry Brigade during Operation Herrick 7 in October 2007 and saw action at the Battle of Musa Qala to recover the town of Musa Qala from the Taliban. D Squadron again deployed with 16 Air Assault Brigade, initially around Musa Qala, then east of Girishk during Operation Herrick 8 in April 2008. A, B and C Squadrons deployed on Operation Herrick 11 in 2009, A and B Squadron with 11 Light Brigade Headquarters based out of Camp Bastion and C Squadron as the Battle Group North West Manoeuvre Group, initially based in Musa Q’aleh District Centre and subsequently elsewhere in the Battle Group area of operations. There was another deployment again by D Squadron in late 2010 on Operation Herrick 13 and finally, B squadron deployed with 1st Mechanised Brigade Operation Herrick 18 in April 2013.

=== Recent deployments ===
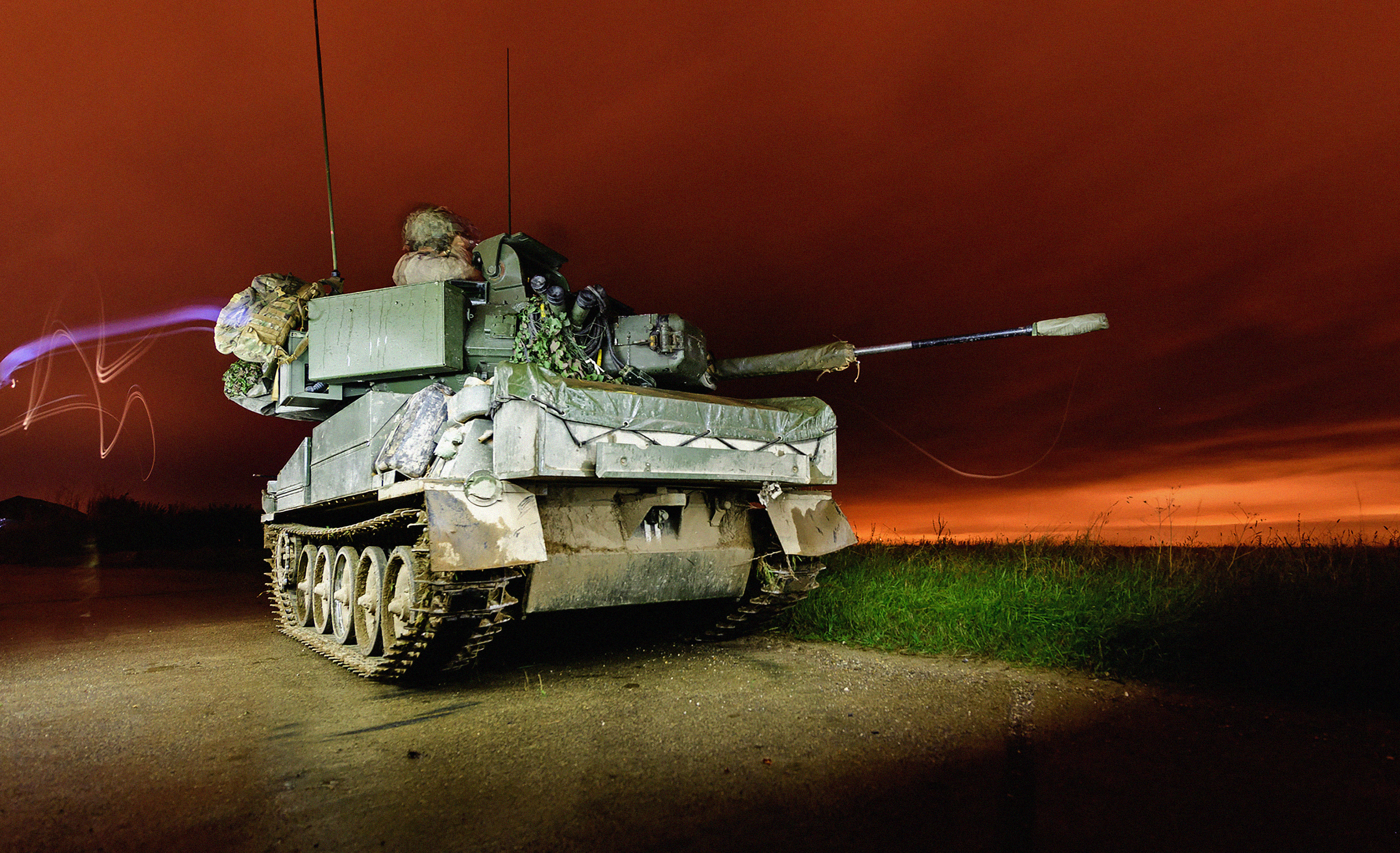
C Sqn Household Cavalry Regiment Scimitar vehicle at night during Exercise IRON SCOUT 3.

The Household Cavalry Regiment contributed to security at the London Olympic Games in 2012 and flood relief in the local area during 2014.

The regiment moved from Combermere Barracks to the new, specialist build barracks, Powle Lines, in Bulford Camp in May 2019.

== Role ==
In 2014, the Household Cavalry Regiment was re-designated from a Brigade Reconnaissance Regiment to Armoured Cavalry as part of the Army 2020 reforms. The Household Cavalry Regiment's task is to provide timely and accurate information and intelligence to the Brigade Commander in order to enable decision-making. To fulfil this function, the Household Cavalry Regiment conducts surveillance and reconnaissance activities, mounted or dismounted, in all weathers by day or night. The regiment's vehicles enable information-gathering to be conducted whilst mobile, at pace, and whilst under fire. The change in designation from Brigade Reconnaissance Regiment to Armoured Cavalry reflects the evolving role of the Household Cavalry Regiment in preparation for Ajax (Scout SV). The Household Cavalry Regiment is under the command of 3rd Deep Reconnaissance Strike Brigade, based at Tidworth Camp in Wiltshire. In November 2025, the Ministry of Defence announced that a Household Cavalry Regiment squadron of 27 Ajax vehicles was available for deployment.

== Equipment ==
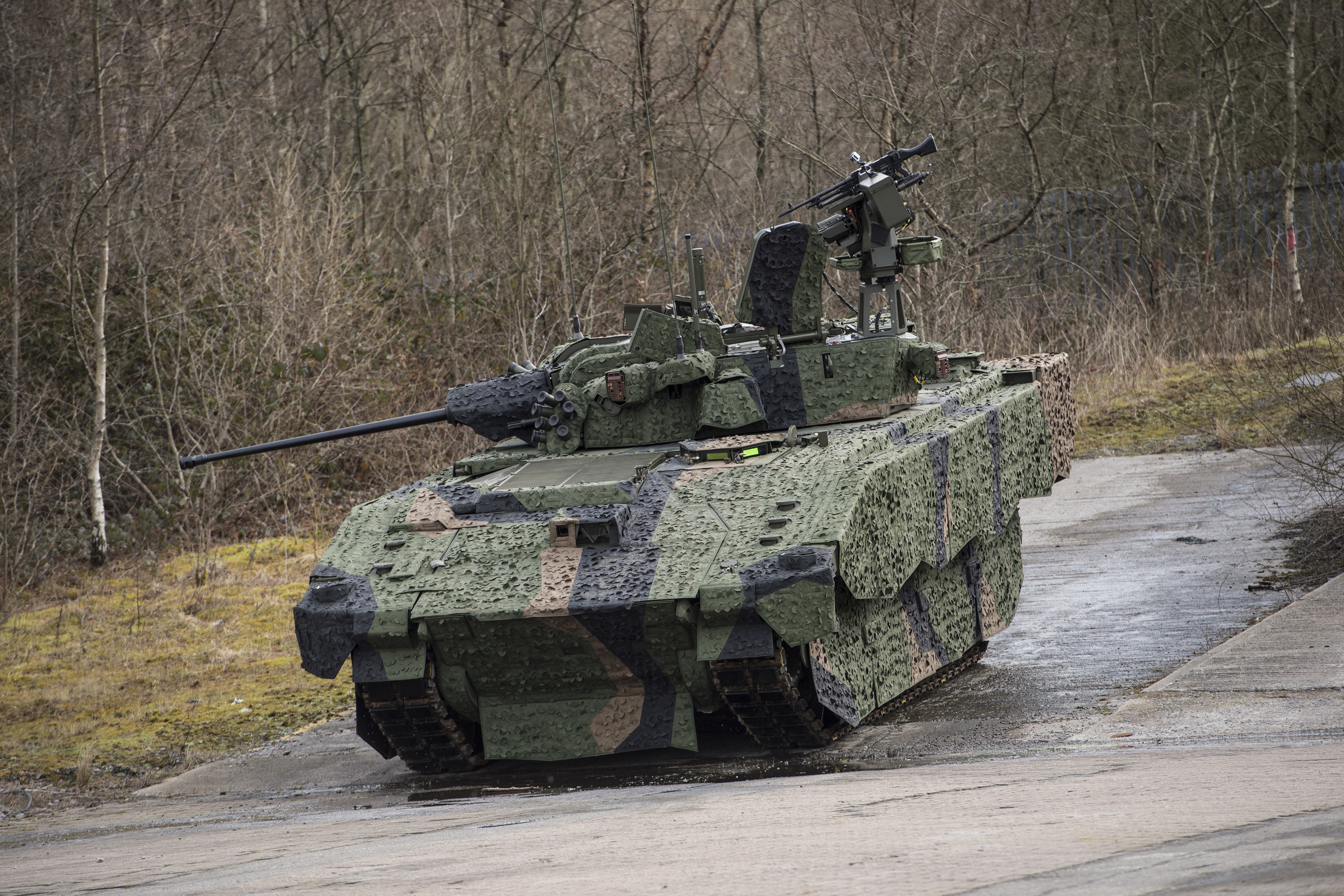
AJAX, the Future Armoured Fighting Vehicle

- Ajax: The Household Cavalry Regiment is converting to Ajax (Scout SV) - the British Army's first new Armoured Fighting Vehicle platform in a generation. Ajax will replace the Warrior by 2029.

== Commanding Officers ==
Regimental Commanding Officers included:

- 1992–1994: Lieutenant Colonel P. Simon W. F. Falkner
- 1994–1996: Lt Col William R. Rollo
- 1996–1998: Lt Col Barney W. B. White-Spunner
- 1998–2001: Lt Col Patrick J. Tabor
- 2001–2003: Lt Col Mark C. van der Lande
- 2003–2005: Lt Col Charles B. B. Clee
- 2005–2008: Lt Col Edward Alexander Smyth-Osbourne
- 2008–2011: Lt Col Henry R. D. Fullerton
- 2011–2013: Lt Col James P. Eyre
- 2013–2016: Lt Col Denis James
- 2016–2018: Lt Col Edward P. W. Hayward
- 2018–2020: Lt Col Mark S. P. Berry
- 2020–2022: Lt Col Anthony E. Gilham
- 2022–2025: Lt Col Roland J. Spiller
- 2025–present: Lt Col Alex Howard

== See also ==
- Kingcol
- Gocol
- Mercol
- Household Cavalry Mounted Regiment
- Formation reconnaissance regiment
