= Flying column =

Ad hoc small, independent, combined-arms military unit

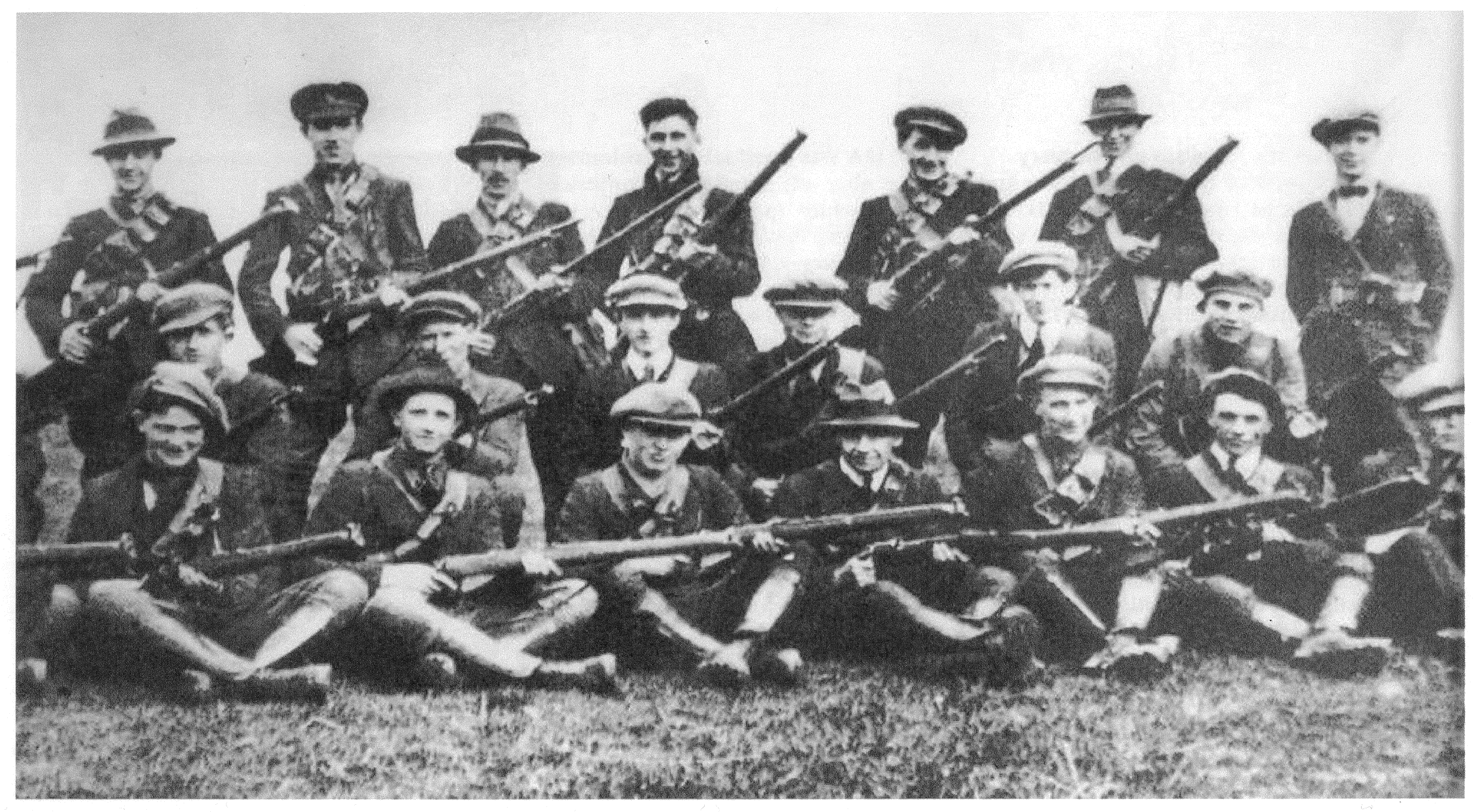
Seán Hogan's #2 Flying Column, Third Tipperary Brigade, during the Irish War of Independence.

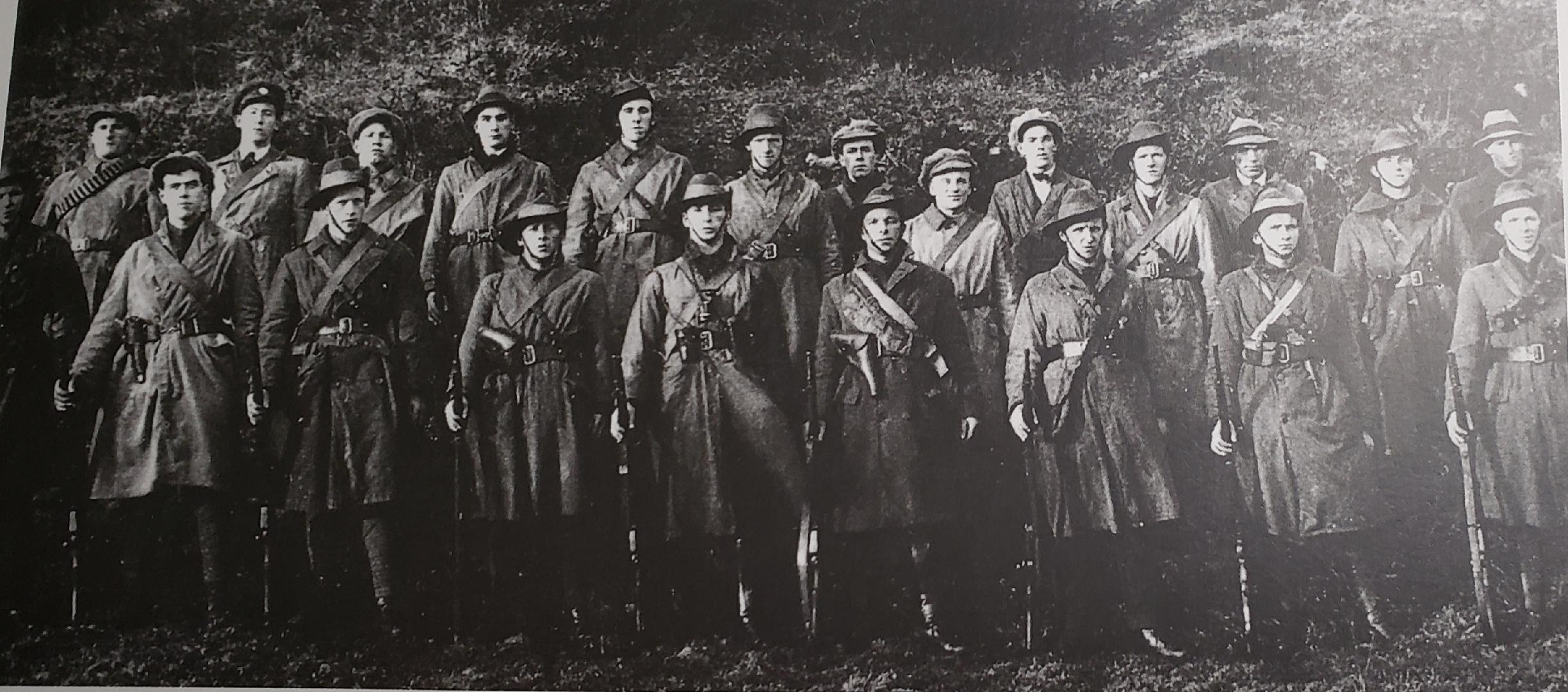
West Connemara Flying Column 1922

A flying column is a small, independent, military land unit capable of rapid mobility and usually composed of all arms. It is often an ad hoc unit, formed during the course of operations.

The term is usually, though not necessarily, applied to forces less than the strength of a brigade. As mobility is its primary purpose, a flying column is accompanied by the minimum of equipment. It generally uses suitable fast transport; historically, horses were used, with trucks and helicopters replacing them in modern times.

== History ==
Flying columns are mentioned by Sun Tzu in his Art of War in such a fashion that indicates it was not a new concept at the time of his writing. This dates to at least the middle 6th century BC, and possibly the late 8th century BC.

The Roman army made good use of the flying columns in the early imperial era. One Roman commander, the proconsul Germanicus Caesar used flying columns to great effect in the early stages of the campaign against one of Rome's greatest enemies, Arminius. Scouts, raiders, and screening forces were used against the Germanic tribes responsible for destroying three Roman legions (the 17th, 18th, and 19th) in the Battle of the Teutoburg Forest.

Boer kommandos in 17th–20th-century South Africa may be regarded as a form of flying column (unlike commandos in the more recent sense). The mobile columns employed against Boer forces, by British Empire forces in the South African War of 1899–1902, were usually of the strength of two battalions of infantry, a battery of artillery, and a squadron of cavalry, almost exactly half that of a mixed brigade.

Flying columns have also been used in guerrilla warfare, notably the mobile armed units of the Irish Republican Army during the Irish War of Independence 1919–1921. During this period, the most successful Irish flying columns in terms of casualties inflicted on the police and military were the west Connemara, the south Mayo and the west Mayo column under the command of Michael Kilroy.

In 1919, Polish officer Stanisław Maczek created a flying company made of a battle-hardened infantry, using horses for mobility, and a lot of machine guns for fire power. They were part of the 4th Infantry Division (Poland).

In the 1920s, Defence Scheme No. 1, the proposed Canadian response to an invasion by the United States, Lt. Col. James "Buster" Brown suggested "immediate dispatch of flying columns on the declaration of war" in order to counter-invade across the border and enact a scorched earth policy, forcing the US to divert military resources towards the defense of its northern cities.

During and shortly after the Anglo-Iraqi War of 1941, British forces employed flying columns code-named Kingcol, Mercol and Gocol. Kingcol advanced into Iraq from Jordan and Palestine.

== See also ==
- Jock column
- Combe Force
- Durruti Column
- Long Range Desert Group
- Kampfgruppe
