= Habforce =

Habforce was a British Army military unit created in 1941 during the Anglo-Iraqi War and still active during the Syria-Lebanon campaign during the fighting in the Middle East in the Second World War.

== Creation and composition ==
Habforce, short for "Habbaniya Force", was created from forces available in the British Mandate of Palestine to relieve RAF Habbaniya. On 4 May 1941, the British Prime Minister, Winston Churchill, ordered General Sir Archibald Wavell, the Commander-in-Chief (C-in-C) Middle East Command, to create this force.

RAF Habbaniya was a Royal Air Force station at Habbaniya in the Kingdom of Iraq. From 30 April, the small British garrison at Habbaniya had been under siege by strong Iraqi forces loyal to Rashid Ali. On 1 April, Rashid Ali and his anti-British supporters had staged a coup against the pro-British government of Regent Amir Abdul Illah and relations between the British and the government of Rashid Ali quickly deteriorated until, on 2 May, the British made air attacks throughout Iraq.

Habforce, commanded by Major General John Clark. During the Anglo-Iraqi War, Habforce was organized into two parts, a flying column named Kingcol and the main body. The main body, under the command of Lieutenant Colonel John Nichols, comprised the Headquarters of the 1st Cavalry Division (elements), the 1st Battalion, Essex Regiment, minus two rifle companies, the 60th (North Midland) Field Regiment, Royal Artillery, with 25 pounder gun-howitzers, less 237 Field Battery (with Kingcol) and a battery of 2-pounder anti-tank guns, Royal Artillery, minus one troop and a detachment of the Arab Legion consisting of three mechanised squadrons around 400 men strong. The force initially advanced ahead of Kingcol.

Kingcol was organized to relieve RAF Habbaniya as soon as possible. The column was named after its commander, Brigadier J.J. Kingstone. Kingcol comprised 4th Cavalry Brigade, 237th Battery 60th (North Midland) Field Regiment, Royal Artillery, equipped with 25 Pounders. 1st Battalion Essex Regiment, ('A' and 'D' Companies with two Bren gun carriers. Personnel carried in transport of the Royal Army Service Corps) one anti-tank troop, Royal Artillery, equipped with 2 Pounders. Number 2 Armoured Car Company RAF, with 8 Fordson armoured cars and two supply companies, Royal Army Service Corps. The 4th Cavalry Brigade comprised Composite Household Cavalry Regiment, the Warwickshire Yeomanry, and the Royal Wiltshire Yeomanry.

Habforce was employed again during the Syria-Lebanon campaign, where it comprised the 4th Cavalry Brigade, the 1st Battalion, Essex Regiment, the Arab Legion Mechanized Regiment, the 237th Battery, 60th Field Regiment, Royal Artillery, an Australian 2-pounder anti-tank battery (detached from the 2/1st Anti-Tank Regiment) and the 169th Light Anti-Aircraft Battery.

== Anglo-Iraqi War ==
By 6 May, the Iraqi forces besieging RAF Habbaniya had fled.

On 11 May (some sources say 12 May) Kingcol, the flying column of Habforce, left Haifa in the British Mandate of Palestine and advanced towards RAF Habbaniya. The column arrived at Pumping Station H4 eight hours later. On 14 May, Kingcol took the fort at Ar Rutba in Al Anbar Province in Iraq. Rutbah had been occupied earlier by the 1st Battalion Essex Regiment and the Arab Legion, although the first Kingcol forces to enter the fort after the Iraqi Forces had fled, were two armoured cars of Number 2 Armoured Car Company RAF under the command of Sqn Ldr Casano. Kingstone rushed ahead of his column to catch up with Glubb Pasha to coordinate the rest of the 220 mi (350 km) advance towards RAF Habbaniya. The next objective was Kilo 25, a point on the Baghdad road about 14 mi (23 km) west of Ramadi. On the advice of Colonel Ouvry Roberts in Habbaniya, the column was to turn south-east at Kilo 25 to avoid a confrontation with an Iraqi brigade thought to be at Ramadi. The column would then skirt Lake Habbaniya and advance on Habbaniya by crossing a new bridge at the village of Mujara. The village had been taken on 10 May and a bridge over the water regulator there was completed by 16 May.

On 15 May, Kingcol left Rutbah and an element of the column was attacked by a lone Heinkel He 111 bomber of Fliegerführer Irak (Air Commander Iraq). The British thought at first that the Iraqis must have obtained a Blenheim bomber. On 16 May, the column reached Kilo 25 and turned off the main road and headed south-east in accordance with Roberts' suggestion. Disaster then struck when numerous vehicles driven by inexperienced drivers sank up to the axles in soft sand. The whole column halted while vehicles were dug out one by one. On 17 May, three Messerschmitt Bf 110 fighters attacked an extended column of Kingcol in the desert. Luckily for the British, the fighters had not attacked the previous day when many vehicles were immobilized by the soft sand. On 18 May, Kingcol arrived in Habbaniya, where elements joined the other elements of Iraqforce in the advance on Fallujah. On 19 May, the Iraqis in Fallujah surrendered. On 22 May, the British forces in Fallujah repulsed an Iraqi counter-attack to re-take the city. On 25 May, the main body of Habforce reached Habbaniya and joined the advance on Baghdad. A northern column left Fallujah on 27 May and a southern column left on 28 May. On 31 May, the mayor of Baghdad surrendered the city.

== See also ==
- Iraqforce
- Gocol
- Mercol
- Harcol
