= Axel von Blomberg =

German Air Force officer

Major Axel von Blomberg (1908 – 15 May 1941) was an officer in the German Air Force (Luftwaffe) before and during the Second World War. He is best known for the role he played during the Anglo-Iraqi War.

== Biography ==
Blomberg was a son of Field Marshal Werner von Blomberg.

He was part of a German military mission to the Kingdom of Iraq which had the cover name "Special Staff F" (Sonderstab F). Sonderstab F was commanded by General (General der Flieger) Hellmuth Felmy, and Blomberg had the task of commanding a Brandenburgers reconnaissance group that was to precede "Flyer Command Iraq" (Fliegerführer Irak). He was also given the task of integrating Fliegerführer Irak with Iraqi forces in operations against the British. As part of the latter, he was to raise a German-led Arab Brigade (Arabische Brigade) in Iraq from the thousands of volunteers available from Iraq, from Syria, from Palestine, from Saudi Arabia, and from throughout the Arab world. Before Blomberg could accomplish any of his tasks, he was killed.

On 15 May 1941, Blomberg was sent to Baghdad to make arrangements for a council of war with the Iraqi government. The council was planned for 17 May. However, Blomberg was killed by friendly fire from Iraqi positions. His Heinkel 111 bomber was shot at from the ground as it flew low on approach and Blomberg was found to be dead upon landing. (Note: Lyman indicates Blomberg was shot down by Iraqi troops while Kurowski indicates that he was hit when Arab tribesmen shot into the air and was found to be dead upon landing)

== See also ==
- Führer Directive No. 30
- Brandenburgers
- Mohammad Amin al-Husayni
- Fritz Grobba

== Notes ==
Footnotes

Citations
