= Fawzi al-Qawuqji =

Arab Liberation Army commander (1890–1977)

- فوزي القاوقجي
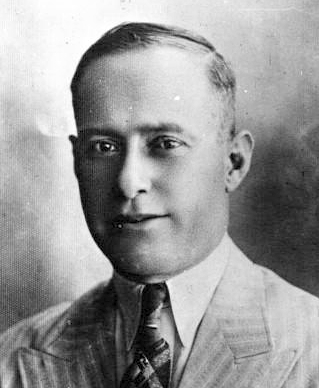
- Fawzi al-Qawuqji in 1936
- Born: 19 January 1890; Tripoli, Ottoman Empire
- Died: 5 June 1977 (aged 87); Beirut, Lebanon
- Military career
- Allegiance: Ottoman Empire (1912–1918); Arab Kingdom of Syria (1918–1920); French Mandate of Syria (1920–1925); Syrian rebels (1925–1927); Kingdom of Nejd and Hejaz (1927–1930); Palestinian Defense Society (1936–1939); Golden Square (1941); Nazi Germany (1941–1945); Arab Liberation Army (1948–1949)
- Branch: Arab Liberation Army
- Service years: 1913–1949
- Rank: German Army Colonel (WWII)
- Commands: Arab Liberation Army 1948–1949
- Conflicts: First World War; Mesopotamian Campaign; Battle of Beersheba; Franco-Syrian War; Great Syrian Revolt; 1925 Hama uprising; Ikhwan Revolt; 1936–39 Arab revolt in Palestine; Second World War; Middle Eastern theatre; 1941 Iraqi coup d'état; Anglo-Iraqi War; Syrian Campaign; 1948 Palestine war; Battle of Mishmar HaEmek; First Arab-Israeli War; Operation Dekel; Operation Hiram
- Awards: Iron Cross, Second Class

Fawzi al-Qawuqji (Arabic: فوزي القاوقجي, Turkish: Fevzi Kavukçu; 19 January 1890 – 5 June 1977) was an Arab nationalist military figure in the interwar period. He served briefly in Palestine in 1936 fighting the British Mandatory suppression of the Palestinian Revolt. A political decision by the British enabled him to flee the country in 1937. He was a colonel in the Nazi Wehrmacht during World War II and served as the Arab Liberation Army (ALA) field commander during the 1948 Palestine War.

== Early life ==
Fawzi al-Qawuqji was born in 1890 into a Turkmen family in the city of Tripoli, which was then part of the Ottoman Empire. He was the son of Abd al-Majid al-Qawuqji, who served in the Ottoman Army, and Fatima al-Rifa'i. He was the great-grandson of the Lebanese Muslim scholar and jurist Abu al-Mahasin al-Qawuqji.

In 1912, he graduated from the military academy in Istanbul. Gilbert Achcar has described him as "Arab nationalism's leading military figure in the interwar period ... served as a commander in all the Arab national battles of the period."

== World War I ==
He served as a captain (Yuzbashi) in the 12th Ottoman corps garrison in Mosul, and in several battles during the First World War, including at Qurna in Iraq and at Beersheba in Ottoman Palestine. He was decorated with the Ottoman Majidi Medal for his role in these battles. He was also awarded the German Iron Cross, second class, for his bravery in the battle around Nabi Samwil. The book O Jerusalem! claims he fought alongside General Otto von Kreiss's Prussian unit during this period. Al-Qawuqji conducted infiltrations behind British lines to report back directly to General Otto Liman von Sanders, and in his operations, he served as special assistant to a cavalry officer, a certain von Leyser. When his loyalty as an Ottoman officer was questioned because of his Arab origins, von Leyser wrote a letter in his defense, which states:

This is to confirm that First Lieutenant Fawzi Bey served with me in his capacity as companion and aide from 1/3/16 until 12/5/17. I can testify to the fact that he offered outstanding service to his country during this period and distinguished himself with unusual energy and experience. (H)e is of good character and intelligent and perceptive, and he has perfected the German language in a few months in a way that has amazed everyone.

== Interwar period ==
The Ottoman Empire collapsed after World War I. Al-Qawuqji supported the independence of the short-lived Arab Kingdom of Syria. In 1920, he fought at the Battle of Maysalun, serving in the army of King Faisal as a captain (ra'is khayyal) in a squadron commanded by Taha al-Hashimi.

After the unsuccessful outcome of the campaign to establish the Arab Kingdom of Syria, Syria became a French Mandate. Al-Qawuqji then joined the Syrian Legion (also known as the French-Syrian Army) which had been created by the French mandatory authorities. Al-Qawuqji received formal training at the French École spéciale militaire de Saint-Cyr. He became commander of a cavalry squadron in Hama.

During the rebellion of 1925–1927, he deserted the French Army to join the rebellion, leading the uprising in Hama in early October 1925. al-Qawuqji remained an outlaw thereafter.

Shakib Arslan brought al-Qawuqji to the Hejaz to help train the army of Saudi monarch Abdul-Aziz. Al-Qawuqji relates that he was unimpressed with Abdul-Aziz, depicting him as self-infatuated and suspicious, who disappointingly attempted to justify his collaboration with the British.

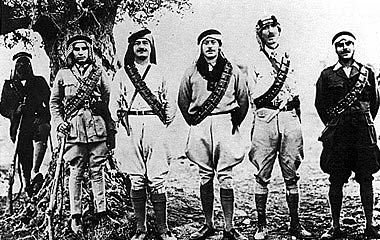
Fawzi al-Qawuqji (3rd from the right) in 1936.

In 1936, al-Qawuqji began fighting the British in Mandatory Palestine in actions that would become known as the 1936–39 Arab revolt in Palestine. He represented the Iraqi Society for the Defense of Palestine, which was separate from forces under the control of Grand Mufti of Jerusalem Haj Amin Husseini. Al-Qawuqji resigned his commission in the Iraqi army and his position at the Royal Military College to lead approximately fifty armed guerrillas into Mandatory Palestine. In June he contacted Fritz Grobba, who was acting as German ambassador to Iraq. This was probably al-Qawuqji's first encounter with a representative of Nazi Germany. In August, he commanded about 200 volunteers, consisting of Iraqis, Syrians, Druze and Palestinians whom he organized into four reinforced platoons, each with an intelligence unit attached, operating in the Nablus–Tulkaram–Jenin triangle until the end of October. His title was "Supreme Commander of the Arab Revolution in South-Syrian Palestine". His troops managed to shoot down several RAF warplanes near Tulkaram in September. The military performance of al-Qawuqji's troops became hampered by internal dissensions and animosity between him and Grand Mufti Husseini, the Arab Higher Committee, and the Mufti's kinsman Abd al-Qadir al-Husayni, who commanded forces that were active in the area around Jerusalem. After a ceasefire had been agreed to on 12 October 1936, the British ordered their troops to desist from hunting him. al-Qawuqji in turn issued an order saying he would personally impose severe penalties on any Arab who opened fire on British soldiers. He was proud of his military achievements in the field, which he considered instrumental in bringing Britain to the negotiating table. Both the British and Haj Amin considered him a threat. With the assistance of 5,000 local villagers, and the connivance of British authorities, on orders from London, who refrained from acting on their intelligence, and had vacated the area, interdicting attempts to intercept him, he crossed the Jordan River with his troops on the night of 25/26 October into Transjordan. In November 1936, the leading Sheikhs of Bani Sakhr, Mithqal Al-Fayez and Haditha Al-Khraisha, accompanied Fawzi Al-Qawuqji, Supreme Commander of the Arab Revolution in South-Syrian Palestine, through the desert to ensure his safe journey. A few weeks later he returned to Iraq.

Although al-Qawuqji and Grand Mufti al-Husseini had periods of considerable friction and discord, particularly during the 1936–39 Arab revolt in Palestine, the two men subsequently reached a rapprochement. Al-Qawuqji followed the Mufti from Lebanon to Iraq in October 1939, along with other members of the Mufti's entourage, including Jamal al-Husayni, Rafiq al-Tamimi, and Sheikh Hasan Salama. Al-Qawuqji became the Mufti's military advisor in the 'Arab Committee' that Haj Amin Husseini formed in Baghdad. Husseini's group, including, al-Qawuqji, played critical roles in the pro-Axis coup. His frequently demonstrated prowess won him fame among the Arab population and the esteem of Haj Amin Husseini. His popular following, however, was not altogether to the Mufti's liking. He was prominent in the Kingdom of Iraq during the Rashid Ali coup of 1941 and, during the subsequent Anglo-Iraqi War, he again fought against the British. Al-Qawuqji led approximately 500 "irregulars" in the area between Rutbah and Ramadi. He established a reputation as bold fighter. He was also known to either execute or mutilate his prisoners. After the Rashid Ali regime collapsed, al-Qawuqji and his irregular forces were targeted for destruction by the Mercol flying column and were chased out of Iraq. While still in Iraq, a British plane strafed and almost killed him.

== World War II ==
=== Berlin ===
After suffering serious wounds fighting the British in Iraq, al-Qawuqji was transported to Vichy French-held Syria, and then made his way to Nazi Germany. He remained in Germany for the remainder of World War II, recuperated from his wounds, and married a German woman named Anneliese Müller.

Al-Qawuqji's sojourn in Germany has been the subject of considerable controversy. Gilbert Achcar recounts stories of conflicts during his Berlin period:

In his memoirs, he tells how, during his stay in hospital, he came under heavy pressure from German civilian and military officials to declare his allegiance to the führer. He even had an altercation with an SS officer who proffered threats when al-Qawuqji insisted that Germany first formally acknowledge the Arab's right to independence. The next day, his son died of poisoning. Al-Qawuqji, convinced that the Nazis had murdered the young man, refused to take part in the funeral they organized.

Achcar reports that al-Qawuqji was as bewildered by rivalries between competing Arab leaders (Grand Mufti Haj Amin al-Husseini and exiled Iraqi former Prime Minister Rashid Ali) as by the Axis foot-dragging over support for Arab nationalist goals. He opposed incorporating Arab units into the Axis armed forces, since he preferred their formation into an independent Arab nationalist army.

In May 1942, after the Axis powers signed secret documents to support the Arab nationalists, al-Qawuqji expressed dissatisfaction with the results, commenting that they were "just symbolic and not an agreement".

=== German military service ===
He was awarded the rank of a colonel of the Wehrmacht (German Army), and given a captain to act as his aide, along with a chauffeured car, and an apartment in Berlin. His expenses were paid by Wehrmacht High Command and by Rashid Ali's Foreign Minister. The Germans used al-Qawuqji's name and reputation extensively in their propaganda.

In Germany, al-Qawuqji continued to oppose the Allies in cooperation with other Arabs who were allied with the Axis powers, including the two competing leaders of the pro-Nazi Arab factions, Grand Mufti Husseini and former Iraqi Prime Minister Rashid Ali al-Gaylani. In June 1941, Wehrmacht High Führer Directive No. 30 and the "Instructions for Special Staff F" (Sonderstab F) designated the Wehrmacht's central agency for all issues that affected the Arab world. General der Flieger Hellmuth Felmy, who was appointed central authority for all Arab affairs concerning the Wehrmacht under the terms of this "Directive No. 30", wrote about al-Qawuqji's 'active interest' and support of the military training of Arabs by the Nazis:

Thus a number of the volunteers had already secretly contacted Fauzi Kaikyi, the Syrian army leader. After his escape by plane from the British, Fauzi had established himself in Berlin and begun to take an active interest in the Arabs at Sunium.

In July 1941, al-Qawuqji wrote a memorandum addressed to General Felmy. This memorandum's subject was the need for German–Arab alliance in Iraq, and included discussions of geography, desert warfare, and combined propaganda efforts directed against Jews. Al-Qawuqji was officially transferred to Sonderstab F after he was fully recovered from the wounds he received fighting against the British in Iraq. Gen. Felmy's memoirs (written after the war when he was a prisoner of the allies and published by the US Army) mention the political conflicts between the 'chieftains' (Grand Mufti Husseini and former Iraqi Prime Minister Rashid Ali) among Arabs receiving military training in Greece, and their consequent contact with al-Qawuqji. He consistently campaigned for the formation of an independent Arab nationalist army that would fight as German allies, rather than incorporate Arabs under the German command structure. On 4 September 1941 al-Qawuqji told a comrade in Syria "I will come with Arab and German troops to help you."

In 1945, he was captured by Soviet forces, and reportedly held prisoner until February 1947.

== 1948 Palestine War and Arab Liberation Army ==
=== Arab League field commander ===
In 1947 al-Qawuqji traveled to Egypt, via France, and proclaimed that he was "at the disposition of the Arab people should they call on [him] to take up arms again." In August he threatened that, should the United Nations Partition Plan for Palestine vote go the wrong way, "we will have to initiate total war. We will murder, wreck and ruin everything standing in our way, be it English, American, or Jewish".

After the UN Partition vote, the Arab League appointed him to be field commander of the Arab Liberation Army (ALA) in the 1948 Palestine War. This appointment was opposed by Haj Amin Husseini, who had appointed his own kinsman Abdul Qadir al-Husseini as the commander of the Army of the Holy War. The execution of the 1948 Palestine War was marked by the personal, family, and political rivalry between al-Qawuqji (who fought mainly in northern Palestine) and al-Husayni, who fought mostly in the Jerusalem area.

=== Return to Palestine ===
In early March 1948, al-Qawuqji moved some of his forces from the Damascus area and crossed (unmolested by British troops) into Palestine over the Allenby Bridge on 6 and 7 March, leading hundreds of Arab and Bosnian volunteers in a column of twenty-five trucks. The British troops' inaction infuriated General Sir Gordon MacMillan, who stated that al-Qawuqji should not be allowed "to go openly rampaging over territory in which Britain considered herself a sovereign power." General MacMillan did not want to confront al-Qawuqji's force, however, since he saw "no point in getting a lot of British soldiers killed in that kind of operation."

Inside Mandatory Palestine, al-Qawuqji commanded a few thousand armed men who had infiltrated the area. They were grouped into several regiments concentrated in Galilee and around Nablus. According to Collins and Lapierre, Al-Qawuqji told his troops that the purpose was "ridding Palestine of the Zionist plague", and his aim was "to drive all the Jews into the sea." Historian Shay Hazkani wrote that al-Qawuqji declared that the "object of our mission in Palestine is to destroy Zionism, to kill the partition plan" and that ALA propaganda contained no mention of genocidal threats such as pushing Jews into the sea.

=== Mishmar HaEmek ===
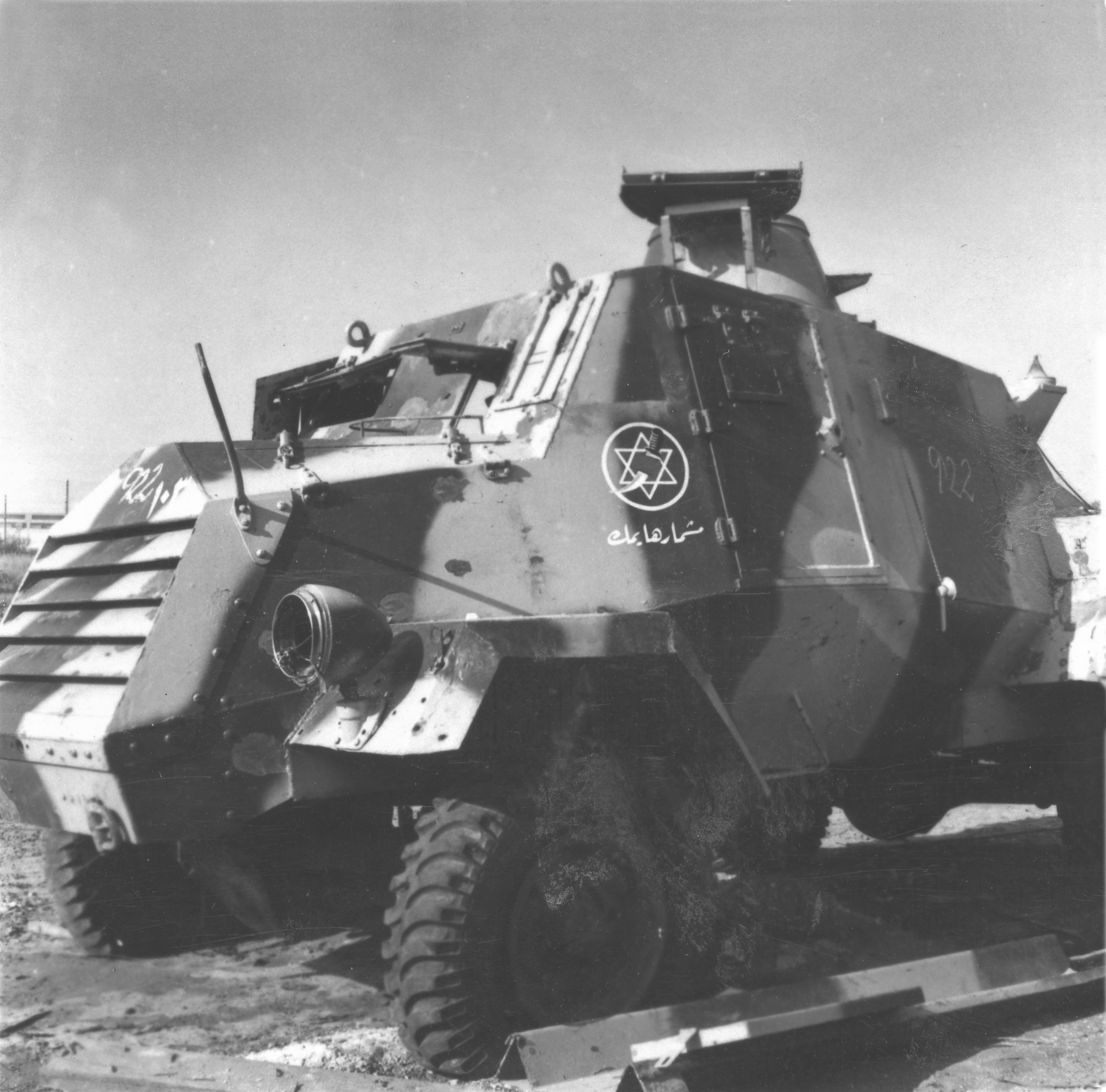
An Otter armored car captured by the Haganah from the ALA (Arab Liberation Army- Kaukji's army) on 1948. The car still carries the ALA emblem, a dagger stabbing a Star of David.

In April 1948, the ALA mounted a major attack on the kibbutz Mishmar HaEmek which sat near the strategic road that connected Haifa to Jenin, and was surrounded by Arab villages. On 4 April, al-Qawuqji initiated the first use of artillery during the war by directing his seven 75 and 105 mm field guns to fire on the kibbutz for a 36-hour barrage. During this battle al-Qawuqji issued a number of announcements that were subsequently proven false. In the first 24-hours he announced victory, on 8 April he announced he had taken Mishmar HaEmek, and after the battle was lost he claimed the Jews had been assisted by non-Jewish Soviet troops and bombers. Copies of these mendacious telegrams are preserved in the Jordanian archives. The Haganah and Palmach counter-attacked and the ALA were routed. The battle was over by 16 April, and most of the Arabs in the area fled, disheartened by the defeat of the ALA or demoralized by the Jewish victory. The remaining minority were expelled from the surrounding Arab villages by Jewish forces.

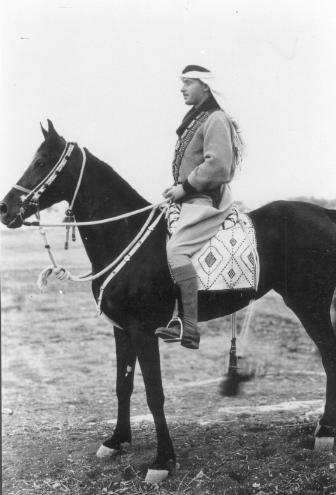
Fawzi al-Quawuqji 24 May 1948

In July, al-Qawuqji launched a rolling offensive of counterattacks, focusing on Ilaniya (Sejera), a Jewish settlement deep in ALA territory. Although he deployed armored cars and a battery of 75 mm artillery to support the ALA infantry, his troops suffered from lack of artillery ammunition and host of other deficiencies. The opposing Golani Twelfth Battalion withstood the attack, inflicting heavy losses on the ALA. The battle ended on 18 July, with the ALA losing the Arab village of Lubiya, which had been their main base in Central Eastern Galilee.

=== Operation Hiram ===
The ALA established control of upper central Galilee, from the Sakhnin–Arabe–Deir Hanna line through Majd al-Krum up to the Lebanese border until October 1948. On 22 October, the date of the third UN Security Council cease-fire order, the ALA attacked Sheikh Abd, a hilltop overlooking Kibbutz Manara and put the kibbutz under siege.

Al-Qawuqji told the UN observers that he demanded depopulation of nearby Kibbutz Yiftah forces, and a diminution of Haganah (Israeli) forces in Manara. The Haganah responded by demanding that ALA withdraw from its positions. Al-Qawuqji rejected these counter-demands. The Haganah then informed the United Nations that in view of al-Qawuqji's actions it did not feel encumbered by the UN's cease-fire order, and on 24 October launched Operation Hiram. Historian Benny Morris concludes that although the Israelis had planned for Operation Hiram, they might not have launched this campaign without the justification provided by al-Qawuqji's military provocations. The ALA were driven from their positions, and the Arab forces lost all of upper Galilee, even though this had been assigned to the Arabs by the UN Partition Plan. On 30 October the Israeli Carmeli Brigade retook Sheikh Abd from the ALA, who had abandoned the position. Shortly thereafter the last of the ALA forces were driven out of Galilee, and al-Qawuqji escaped to Lebanon.

After the end of the war, al-Qawuqji moved to Syria and lived in Damascus, Beirut, and Tripoli.

== Published works ==
- al-Qawuqji, Fauzi (1972): Memoirs of al-Qawuqji, Fauzi in Journal of Palestine Studies
  - "Memoirs, 1948, Part I" in 1, no. 4 (Sum. 72): 27–58. (PDF)
  - "Memoirs, 1948, Part II" in 2, no. 1 (Aut. 72): 3–33. (PDF)

== See also ==
- Great Syrian Revolt
- Ayyash Al-Haj
- Ibrahim Hananu
- Yusuf al-'Azma
- Abd Al-Rahman Shahbandar
- Sultan al-Atrash
- Henri Gouraud
- Adham Khanjar
- Saleh Al-Ali
- Hasan al-Kharrat

== Bibliography ==
- Kessler, Oren (2023). Palestine 1936: The Great Revolt and the Roots of the Middle East Conflict. Rowman & Littlefield. ISBN 1538148803
- Parsons, Laila (2016). The Commander: Fawzi al-Qawuqji and the Fight for Arab Independence, 1914–1948. Hill and Wang. ISBN 978-0-80906-712-1
- Parsons, Laila (Summer 2007). "Soldiering for Arab Nationalism: Fawzi al-Qawuqji in Palestine". Journal of Palestine Studies. 36 (4): 33–48. doi:10.1525/jps.2007.36.4.33. JSTOR 10.1525/jps.2007.36.4.33.
- Lyman, Robert (2006). Iraq 1941: The Battles for Basra, Habbaniya, Fallujah and Baghdad. Campaign. Oxford, New York: Osprey Publishing. p. 96. ISBN 1-84176-991-6.
- Provence, Michael (2005). The Great Syrian Revolt and the Rise of Arab Nationalism. University of Texas Press. ISBN 9780292706804.
- Nafi, Basheer M. (1998), Arabism, Islamism and the Palestine question, 1908–1941: a political history, Garnet and Ithaca Press, ISBN 0-86372-235-0
- Felmy, Gen. Hellmuth; Warlimont, Gen. Walter (1952). "Foreword by Generaloberst Franz Haider, Historical Div., HQ, U.S. Army, Europe". German Exploitation of Arab Nationalist Movements in World War II.
