= Martin Drewes =

German World War II fighter pilot

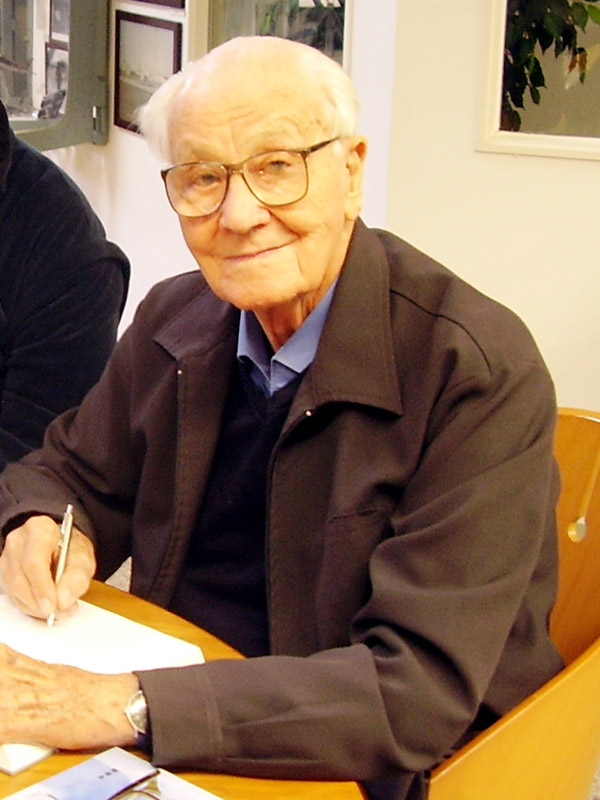
- Martin Drewes at the Aviation Museum Hannover-Laatzen in 2011
- Born: 20 October 1918; Lobmachtersen, Duchy of Brunswick, German Empire (now Salzgitter, Lower Saxony, Germany)
- Died: 13 October 2013 (aged 94); Blumenau, Santa Catarina, Brazil
- Military career
- Allegiance: Nazi Germany; Germany
- Branch: Army (1937–39); Luftwaffe (1939–45); Bundeswehr
- Service years: 1937–45
- Rank: Major (Major); Oberstleutnant d. R.
- Units: ZG 76, NJG 3
- Commands: III./NJG 1
- Conflicts: World War II: Operation Donnerkeil; Mediterranean Theatre; Anglo-Iraqi War; Defence of the Reich
- Awards: Knight's Cross of the Iron Cross with Oak Leaves
- Other work: Civil pilot, businessman

Martin Drewes (20 October 1918 – 13 October 2013) was a German Luftwaffe military aviator and night fighter ace during World War II. He was credited with 52 victories of which 43 were claimed at night whilst flying variants of the Messerschmitt Bf 110 heavy fighter. The majority of his victories were claimed over the Western Front in Defence of the Reich missions against the Royal Air Force's Bomber Command.

Born in Lobmachtersen, Drewes grew up in the Weimar Republic and Nazi Germany. Following graduation from school, he joined the military service of the Army in 1937 and transferred to the Luftwaffe in 1939. He flew his first combat missions in early 1941. In May 1941, he participated in the Anglo-Iraqi War where he claimed his first aerial victory on 20 May 1941. In November 1941, Drewes transferred to the night fighter force, initially serving with Nachtjagdgeschwader 3 (NJG 3—3rd Night Fighter Wing). He claimed his first nocturnal aerial victory on the evening of 17 January 1943. In February 1943, Drewes was appointed Staffelkapitän (squadron leader) and transferred to Nachtjagdgeschwader 1 (NJG 1—1st Night Fighter Wing) in August 1943.

Since 1961 he had been a Lieutenant Colonel in the Reserves of the Luftwaffe (Bundeswehr).

== Early life ==
Drewes was born on 20 October 1918 in Lobmachtersen, at the time in the district of Wolfenbüttel, present day a borough of Salzgitter, Lower Saxony. He was the son of pharmacist Wilhelm Drewes and his wife Margarete, née Hayder, and had an older sister Hanna and a younger sister Käthe. Drewes passed his Abitur (School Leaving Certificate) at the Reformrealgymnasium in Wolfenbüttel in the autumn of 1936. Drewes was a member of the Hitler Youth from 1931 to 1 November 1937, from December 1936 full-time (paid) youth leader (Hauptamtlicher Jugendführer).

He joined the military service in the Army on 2 November 1937 as a Fahnenjunker. He initially served with Panzer-Regiment 6, a regiment of the 3rd Panzer Division, in Neuruppin and was posted to the Kriegsschule in Munich, Bavaria on 15 November 1938 as a Fähnrich. While stationed in Munich, Drewes befriended Chiang Wei-kuo, an adopted son of Republic of China President Chiang Kai-shek. In the Army, he commanded a PzKpfw I.

On 1 August 1939, Drewes was promoted to Leutnant (second lieutenant) and transferred to the Luftwaffe on 1 September. He was trained as a pilot, (Note: Flight training in the Luftwaffe progressed through the levels A1, A2 and B1, B2, referred to as A/B flight training. A training included theoretical and practical training in aerobatics, navigation, long-distance flights and dead-stick landings. The B courses included high-altitude flights, instrument flights, night landings and training to handle the aircraft in difficult situations. For pilots destined to fly multi-engine aircraft, the training was completed with the Luftwaffe Advanced Pilot's Certificate (Erweiterter Luftwaffen-Flugzeugführerschein), also known as the C-Certificate.) receiving his A/B-licenses in April 1940 at the Luftkriegsschule 3 (LKS 3—3rd air war school), Wildpark-West near Werder. On 1 May, his flight training progressed at the Flugzeugführerschule (C)5 where he received his C-Certificate on 30 August followed by attending the Blindflugschule 3 (3rd Blind Flying School) at Königsberg, East Prussia. On 16 October, he then trained as a Zerstörer (destroyer) pilot at the Zerstörerschule 1 (ZS 1—1st destroyer school) at Schleißheim near Munich.

On 27 March 1943, in Germany, Martin Drewes married Wulfhild Ellen Erna Wegener, when she assumed the name Drewes, with whom he remained married until their divorce on 16 November 1948. From this marriage, his daughter, Wulfhild Drewes, was born on 10 January 1944 in Cuxhaven, Lower Saxony. In honor of his first wife, Drewes painted the initials "WD" on the tail of one of his aircraft.

== World War II ==
World War II in Europe began on Friday 1 September 1939, when German forces invaded Poland. On 8 February 1941, Drewes was posted to 4. Staffel (4th squadron) of Zerstörergeschwader 76 (ZG 76—76th Destroyer Wing). (Note: For an explanation of the meaning of Luftwaffe unit designation see Organisation of the Luftwaffe during World War II.) 4. Staffel was a squadron of II. Gruppe (2nd group) and was equipped with the Messerschmitt Bf 110 twin-engine heavy fighter, flying combat air patrols over the North Sea and German Bight.

II. Gruppe of ZG 76, also known as the "Shark Group" (Haifischgruppe) due to their distinct coloring scheme, was then transferred to Greece during the Balkans campaign. In May 1941, 4. Staffel of ZG 76 was order by Sonderkommando Junck (Special Force Junck), named after its commander Oberst Werner Junck and later renamed to Fliegerführer Irak (Flyer Command Iraq), to fly to Iraq. There, German forces under the cover name Special Staff F supported pro-Axis Iraqi forces during the Anglo-Iraqi War . In total, Drewes flew 36 combat missions, including 17 ground attack missions. On 20 May, he claimed his first aerial victory over a Royal Air Force (RAF) Gloster Gladiator biplane. His area of operations included Mosul, Kirkuk and lastly Aleppo, Syria. By 26 May, despite cannibalizing two machines damaged in a RAF raid on Mosul, no Bf 110 was left serviceable. That day, he was awarded the Iron Cross 2nd Class (Eisernes Kreuz zweiter Klasse). Drewes, and two other pilots, was then flown to Rhodes, Greece on an Italian Savoia-Marchetti SM.79 medium bomber, tasked with bringing new aircraft to Iraq. The return flight never made it past Aleppo where the task force was ordered to retreat to Athens and then to Leeuwarden, the Netherlands.

In mid-June 1941, 4. Staffel of ZG 76 was again flying patrols from Leeuwarden and De Kooy Airfield. Drewes received the Front Flying Clasp of the Luftwaffe in Silver (Frontflugspange in Silber) on 2 July 1941. On 29 August, he claimed his second aerial victory over a Supermarine Spitfire shot down over the sea. Drewes was promoted to Oberleutnant (first lieutenant) on 1 November. His II. Gruppe of ZG 76 was then converted to a night fighter unit and renamed III. Gruppe of Nachtjagdgeschwader 3 (NJG 3—3rd Night Fighter Wing).

=== Night fighter career ===
A map of part of the Kammhuber Line. The 'belt' and night fighter 'boxes' are shown.

Following the 1939 aerial Battle of the Heligoland Bight, RAF attacks shifted to the cover of darkness, initiating the Defence of the Reich campaign. By mid-1940, Generalmajor (Brigadier General) Josef Kammhuber had established a night air defense system dubbed the Kammhuber Line. It consisted of a series of control sectors equipped with radars and searchlights and an associated night fighter. Each sector named a Himmelbett (canopy bed) would direct the night fighter into visual range with target bombers. In 1941, the Luftwaffe started equipping night fighters with airborne radar such as the Lichtenstein radar. This airborne radar did not come into general use until early 1942.

In January 1942, III. Gruppe of NJG 3 moved from Stuttgart-Echterdingen to northern Germany, to airfields at Stade and Lüneburg. There, the unit was tasked with protecting Hamburg from air attacks. In February, Drewes flew missions in support of Operation Donnerkeil (11–13 February), an air superiority operation to support the Kriegsmarine's (German Navy) Operation Cerberus. During the operation, the two battleships Scharnhorst and Gneisenau and the cruiser Prinz Eugen, docked in the port of Brest, successfully escaped from France and reached German ports. In the timeframe May to June 1943, he flew six specialized task force missions in Norway, including escort missions for the battleship Tirpitz and a transport for heavy water. Drewes claimed his first aerial victory as a night fighter pilot on the evening of 17 January 1943 when he shot down a Short Stirling bomber.

=== Staffelkapitän ===
In February 1943, Drewes was appointed Staffelkapitän (squadron leader) of 7. Staffel of NJG 3. At the time, this squadron was based at Copenhagen, Denmark. He claimed his second nocturnal aerial victory on over a Handley Page Halifax bomber in the vicinity of Store Heddinge on 14 March 1943. On 9 April, he was awarded the Iron Cross 1st Class (Eisernes Kreuz erster Klasse).

For two months, Drewes was temporarily transferred to IV. Gruppe (4th group) of Nachtjagdgeschwader 1 (NJG 1—1st Night Fighter Wing) in June 1943. This Gruppe was based at Leeuwarden. On 15 August, the transfer was made permanent and Drewes was named Staffelkapitän of 11. Staffel, a squadron of IV. Gruppe of NJG 1. On 3 October 1943, his Bf 110 was hit by the return fire of Avro Lancaster bomber. The aircraft was severely damaged and burning, resulting in a forced landing at Allendorf-Haiger. Drewes claimed two Boeing B-17 Flying Fortress bombers shot down during daytime operations on 11 January 1944. For his previous achievements, he was awarded the German Cross in Gold (Deutsches Kreuz in Gold) on 24 February 1944.

=== Gruppenkommandeur ===
On 7 March, he was tasked with the leadership of III. Gruppe (3rd group) of NJG 1, becoming its acting Gruppenkommandeur (group commander). On 30–31 March 1944, Drewes claimed three Lancaster bombers shot down during the raid on Nuremberg. One of the aircraft shot down was Lancaster W5006 from No. 9 Squadron.

His adjutant in the group at the time was Oberleutnant Walter Scheel, who later became the President of West Germany (1 July 1974 – 30 June 1979). On the night of 21–22 July 1944, Drewes claimed two Lancaster bombers destroyed, but was also shot down in his Bf 110 G-4 (Werknummer 720410—factory number). Although Drewes was injured, he and his crew, Oberfeldwebel Georg "Schorsch" Petz and Oberfeldwebel Erich Handke, escaped by parachute.

At the end of hostilities he had flown 252 operations, and claimed a total of 52 victories (including a Spitfire, a Gladiator, seven American 4-engined bombers shot down in daylight operations, and 43 British bombers at night), most of them achieved with his crew, Petz and Handke. Drewes was decorated with Ritterkreuz and Eichenlaub. He was captured by British forces at the end of the war.

== Later life ==
In February 1947, Drewes was released from captivity. He then left Germany, travelling to Italy. In Genua, he took the ship North King to Brazil, arriving in Rio de Janeiro on 20 August 1949. From 1950 to 1951, he worked as a pilot and aerial photography. There he built a career as an entrepreneur and married Dulce Hurpia, a Brazilian woman, who gave him a son, Klaus Drewes, a lawyer in Brazil. The long marriage ended only in 2010 by the death of his wife. He returned at least once each year on visits to Germany. He died on 13 October 2013 in Blumenau, Santa Catarina, southern Brazil, of natural causes.

== Summary of career ==
=== Aerial victory claims ===
Foreman, Parry and Mathews, authors of Luftwaffe Night Fighter Claims 1939 – 1945, researched the German Federal Archives and found records for 47 nocturnal victory claims, not documenting those aerial victories claimed as a Zerstörer pilot. Mathews and Foreman also published Luftwaffe Aces – Biographies and Victory Claims, listing Drewes with 45 claims, including one as a Zerstörer pilot, plus four further unconfirmed claims. According to Drewes' own account, three further B-17 bombers claimed, one on 19 May 1943 and two on 26 July 1943 respectively, were blocked by the Luftwaffe command chain and have not been documented.

Chronicle of aerial victories
This and the ♠ (Ace of spades) indicates those aerial victories which made Drewes an "ace-in-a-day", a term which designates a fighter pilot who has shot down five or more airplanes in a single day. This and the – (dash) indicates unwitnessed aerial victory claims for which Drewes did not receive credit. This and the ? (question mark) indicates information discrepancies listed by Drewes, Foreman, Parry and Mathews.
Claim (total)	Claim (nocturnal)	Date	Time	Type	Location	Serial No./Squadron No.
– 6. Staffel of Zerstörergeschwader 76 –
—		20 May 1941	12:00	Gladiator	Irak near Al-Faluja	
1		29 August 1941	11:00? (Note: According to Drewes claimed at 13:00.)	Spitfire	off Den Helder off Great Yarmouth over sea	
– 7. Staffel of Nachtjagdgeschwader 3 –
2	1	17 January 1943	22:32	Stirling	Linden	
3	2	14 March 1943	21:42	Halifax	Store Heddinge	DT620/No. 138 Squadron
— (Note: This claim is not listed in Luftwaffe Aces – Biographies and Victory Claims nor in Luftwaffe Night Fighter Claims 1939 – 1945. According to Drewes, this claim was submitted but was blocked by the Luftwaffe command chain.)		19 May 1943	14:12	B-17	80 km (50 mi) northwest of Heligoland	
– 11. Staffel of Nachtjagdgeschwader 1 –
4	3	26 June 1943	02:40	Lancaster	south of Texel	
—		26 July 1943	12:10	B-17	vicinity of Bremervörde	
—		26 July 1943	12:58	B-17	vicinity of Leer	
5	4	28 August 1943	03:19	Halifax	Huy	
6	5	31 August 1943	03:58	Halifax	Maastricht	
7	6	27 September 1943	23:50	Halifax	Stadthagen	
—	7? (Note: According to Luftwaffe Aces – Biographies and Victory Claims, this claim was unconfirmed while Luftwaffe Night Fighter Claims 1939 – 1945 confirm this claim.)	26 November 1943	12:47	B-17	west of Lemmer	
8	8	5 January 1944	12:32	B-24	100 km (62 mi) north of Nordeney	
—	9?	11 January 1944	13:15	B-17	1 km (0.62 mi) west of Almelo	
—	10?	11 January 1944	13:45	B-17	northwest of Rotterdam	
9	11	14 January 1944	18:38	Lancaster	Klazienaveen	
10	12	22 January 1944? (Note: According to Drewes claimed on 21 January 1944.)	00:46	Lancaster	20 km (12 mi) west of Sneek	
– III. Gruppe of Nachtjagdgeschwader 1 –
11	13	24 March 1944? (Note: According to Drewes claimed near Geseke at 23:30 on 14 March 1944.)	23:26?	Lancaster	north of Lippstadt	
12	14	25 March 1944	00:10? (Note: According to Luftwaffe Aces – Biographies and Victory Claims and Drewes at 00:20.)	Lancaster	50 km (31 mi) west of Rheine	Lancaster LL694/No. 115 Squadron
13	15	25 March 1944	00:35? (Note: According to Luftwaffe Aces – Biographies and Victory Claims at 00:40. According to Drewes at 00:30 near Eindhoven.)	Lancaster	40 km (25 mi) west of Twente	
14	16	31 March 1944	00:05? (Note: According to Drewes claimed at 00:24.)	Lancaster	northeast of Spa	
15	17	31 March 1944	00:50? (Note: According to Drewes claimed at 00:30.)	Lancaster	Wetzlar	Lancaster W5006/No. 9 Squadron
16	18	31 March 1944	01:20	Lancaster	vicinity of Limburg	Lancaster ND390/No. 97 Squadron
17	19	19 April 1944	00:01	Halifax	30 km (19 mi) northeast of Rouen	Halifax LV956/No. 466 Squadron
18	20	19 April 1944	00:11	Halifax	southwest of Dieppe	
19	21	21 April 1944	00:40	Lancaster	30 km (19 mi) south-southwest of Paris	
20	22	23 April 1944	00:27	Lancaster	10–20 km (6.2–12.4 mi) southeast of Rosières	
21	23	25 April 1944	00:37	Lancaster	30–50 km (19–31 mi) west of Mannheim	
22	24	27 April 1944	00:35? (Note: According to Luftwaffe Aces – Biographies and Victory Claims at 00:50.)	Lancaster	Biberach north of Chaumont	
23	25	27 April 1944	00:50? (Note: According to Luftwaffe Aces – Biographies and Victory Claims at 00:55.)	Lancaster	north of Chaumont; Ampres	
24	26	28 April 1944	01:48	Lancaster	30–50 km (19–31 mi) southeast of Aachen	
25	27	2 May 1944	00:45	Lancaster	60 km (37 mi) northwest of Paris	
26♠	28	4 May 1944	00:18? (Note: According to Luftwaffe Aces – Biographies and Victory Claims at 00:26.)	Lancaster	south of Troyes	
27♠	29	4 May 1944	00:26? (Note: According to Luftwaffe Aces – Biographies and Victory Claims at 00:36.)	Lancaster	northeast of Troyes	
28♠	30	4 May 1944	00:38	Lancaster	Romilly-sur-Seine	
29♠	31	4 May 1944	00:44? (Note: According to Luftwaffe Aces – Biographies and Victory Claims at 00:50.)	Lancaster	Nogent-sur-Seine	
30♠	32	4 May 1944	00:50? (Note: According to Luftwaffe Aces – Biographies and Victory Claims at 01:18.)	Lancaster	80–100 km (50–62 mi) southeast of Paris	
31	33	13 May 1944	00:44	Lancaster	northwest of St. Trond	
32	34	13 May 1944	00:49	Lancaster	north-northwest of St. Trond	
33	35	13 May 1944	01:09	"Lancaster"	south of Ghent	Halifax Mk III LW682 OW-M of the 426 Squadron
34♠	36	22 May 1944	00:50	Lancaster	Zwolle	
35♠	37	22 May 1944	00:58	Lancaster	Deventer	
36♠	38	22 May 1944	01:38	Lancaster	Eindhoven	
37♠	39	22 May 1944	01:50	Lancaster	vicinity of Gouda	
38♠	40	22 May 1944	02:04	Lancaster	vicinity of Breda	
39	41	17 June 1944	02:05	Lancaster	Amsterdam	
40	42	17 June 1944	02:16	Lancaster	80 km (50 mi) west of Amsterdam	
41	43	22 June 1944	02:32	Lancaster	northwest of Schouwen	
42	44	22 June 1944	02:35	Lancaster	15 km (9.3 mi) northwest of Schouwen	
43	45	21 July 1944	01:11	Lancaster	Apeldorn	Halifax MZ511/No. 578 Squadron
44	46	21 July 1944	01:20	Lancaster	west of Oldenzaal	Lancaster PB174/No. 405 (Vancouver) Squadron
45	47	3 March 1945	01:24	Lancaster	west of Münster	

== Promotions ==
- 2 November 1937 Fahnenjunker (Officer Candidate)
- 20 April 1938 Fahnenjunker-Gefreiter (Officer Candidate with Lance Corporal rank)
- 1 August 1938 Fahnenjunker-Unteroffizier (Officer Candidate with Corporal/NCO/Junior Sergeant rank)
- 1 March 1939 Fähnrich (Officer Cadet)
- 1 August 1939 Oberfähnrich (Senior Officer Cadet)
- 1 August 1939 Leutnant (2nd Lieutenant); simultaneously promoted
- 1 November 1941 Oberleutnant (1st Lieutenant)
- 20 April 1944 Hauptmann (Captain) with effect and Rank Seniority (RDA) from 1 May 1944
- 1 December 1944 Major

== Awards and decorations ==
- Sudetenland Medal
- Pilot Badge
- Iron Cross (1939), 2nd and 1st Class
  - 2nd Class (26 May 1941)
  - 1st Class (9 April 1943)
- Front Flying Clasp of the Luftwaffe in Gold with Pennant
  - in Bronze on 20 April 1941
  - in Silver on 2 July 1941
  - in Gold on 31 August 1942
  - in Gold with Pennant and Mission Number "200" (18 January 1945)
- Wound Badge (1939) in Black on 3 October 1943
- Golden HJ Honour Badge (No. 7702)
- German Cross in Gold on 24 February 1944 as Oberleutnant in the 11./Nachtjagdgeschwader 1
- Honour Goblet of the Luftwaffe (Ehrenpokal der Luftwaffe) on 31 March 1944 as Oberleutnant and pilot
- Knight's Cross of the Iron Cross with Oak Leaves
  - Knight's Cross on 27 July 1944 as Hauptmann and Gruppenkommandeur of the III./Nachtjagdgeschwader 1 (Note: According to Scherzer as leader of the III./Nachtjagdgeschwader 1.)
  - 839th Oak Leaves on 17 April 1945 as Major and Gruppenkommandeur of the III./Nachtjagdgeschwader 1
