= Fliegerführer Irak =

- Iraqi aircraft marking, 1941
- Active: 2–29 May 1941
- Disbanded: 30 May
- Country: Kingdom of Iraq
- Branch: Air force
- Type: Air wing
- Size: 2 squadrons
- Part of: Luftwaffe
- Garrison/HQ: Berlin
- Engagements: Anglo-Iraqi War

Commanders
- Notable commanders: Generaloberst Hans Jeschonnek and Generalleutnant Werner Junck

Aircraft flown
- Bomber: Heinkel He 111
- Fighter: Messerschmitt Bf 110
- Transport: Junkers Ju 90 and Junkers Ju 52/3m

Flyer Command Iraq (German: Fliegerführer Irak) (Note: Some sources indicate that this unit was named "Special Force Junck" (Sonderkommando Junck)) was a unit of the German Air Force (Luftwaffe) dispatched to Iraq in May 1941 as part of a German mission to support the regime of Rashid Ali al-Gaylani during the Anglo-Iraqi War. The mission was part of a larger effort to gain support in the Middle East for the Axis powers against the United Kingdom and its allies during the World War II.

== Background ==
On 1 April 1941, the Iraqi politician Rashid Ali al-Gaylani and members of the Golden Square led a coup d'état which overthrow the Kingdom of Iraq's pro-British regime. During the run-up to the coup, its plotters had been informed that Nazi Germany was willing to recognize the new Iraq regime; there had also been discussions on sending matériel to support the Iraqis and other Arab factions which were fighting against the Allies.

German Foreign Minister Joachim von Ribbentrop persuaded Adolf Hitler on 3 May that Dr. Fritz Grobba be secretly returned to Iraq to head up a diplomatic mission to channel support for the Rashid Ali regime. Grobba's mission was accompanied by a military force commanded by the Oberkommando der Wehrmacht, or OKW (the High Command of the Armed Forces). The military mission had the cover name Sonderstab F (Special Staff F); it included components from the Abwehr-based Brandenburgers and the Luftwaffe. Sonderstab F was commanded by General der Flieger Hellmuth Felmy. Fliegerführer Irak (Flyer Command Iraq) was the Luftwaffe component of Sonderstab F, and while it was a part of the Sonderstab F military mission, it was also somewhat separate from it. Its personnel reported to the Luftwaffe High Command and not to the chief of the OKW.

On 6 May, in accordance with the "Paris Protocols", Germany concluded a deal with the Vichy French government to release war material, including aircraft, from sealed stockpiles in Syria, and to transport them to the Iraqis. The French also agreed to allow the passage of other weapons and stores, and to loan several airbases in northern Syria to Germany for the transport of their aircraft to Iraq.

Also on 6 May, Luftwaffe Oberst Werner Junck received instructions in Berlin that he was to take to Iraq a small force of aircraft, which came to be named Special Force Junck (Sonderkommando Junck). After meeting with Reichsmarschall Hermann Göring, Junck was named Commander of Aviation Iraq (Fliegerführer Irak). Junck was then briefed by Generalleutnant Hans Jeschonnek, Göring's chief of staff. While under Junck's tactical direction, Sonderkommando Junck was to be under the overall direction of Jeschonnek. The aircraft of Sonderkommando Junck had Iraqi markings and operated from an air base in Mosul, some 240 miles north of Baghdad.

== Initial composition ==
Fliegerführer Irak was to consist of a squadron of Messerschmitt Bf 110 zerstörer heavy fighters (12 aircraft) from the 4. Staffel/ ZG 76, and a squadron of Heinkel He 111 bombers (12 aircraft). In addition, to assist in transporting the force to Iraq, Junck was lent 13 Junkers Ju 52/3m trimotor transports and Junkers Ju 90 four-engined transport aircraft. All but three of these transports had to be returned to Greece immediately to prepare for the invasion of Crete. (Note: Playfair states this force was made up initially of 14 Messerschmitt 110s and 7 Heinkel 111s. Lyman states it was 12 Heinkel 111s and 12 Messerschmitt 110s. Mackenzie states the force consisted of 15 Heinkel 111s and 14 Messerschmitt 110s. Kurowski states the force consisted of 9 Heinkel 111s and 12 Messerschmitt 110s.)

The military aircraft deployed by the end of the mission were as follows:

- 3 Bf 110D-1 heavy fighters
- 3 Bf 110D-3 heavy fighters
- 6 Bf 110E-1 heavy fighters
- 12 CR.42 fighters
- 6 He 111H-6 tactical bombers
- 6 He 111P-4 tactical bombers
- 10 Ju 52/3m military transports
- 3 Ju 90A-0 military transports

Junck was accompanied to Iraq by Major Axel von Blomberg. Von Blomberg's task was to head a reconnaissance group preceding the unit and to integrate Fliegerführer Irak with Iraqi forces in operations against British-led Allied forces.

== Arrival ==
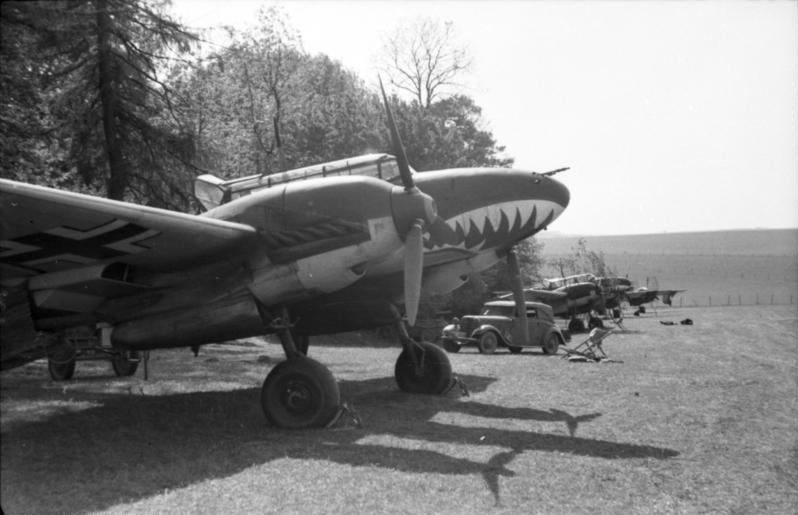
While the German markings were over-painted with Iraqi symbols, many Messerschmitt Bf 110s in Iraq still featured "shark teeth" markings of 4/ZG 76 on the nose.

Dr. Grobba and his mission reached Aleppo in Syria on 9 May, accompanied by two Messerschmitt Bf 110s. They reached Baghdad on 11 May. On 13 May, the bulk of Junck's force arrived in Mosul. The flight had taken the aircraft some 36 hours and covered 1200 miles. Over the following days, Junck's aircraft became increasingly frequent visitors to Baghdad.

Junck's transport aircraft began to stage through Aleppo to Mosul on 14 May. On this date, a further three Messerschmitt Bf 110s and three Heinkel He 111s arrived in Mosul. Due to damaged rear wheels, two over-loaded Heinkel He 111s were left in Palmyra in central Syria. Royal Air Force fighters entered Vichy French airspace and strafed the disabled Heinkels. On 15 May, Junck arrived in Mosul with a further nine aircraft. By the end of the day, he had assembled a force comprising 12 Messerschmitt Bf 110s, 5 Heinkel He 111s, a communications flight with light aircraft, a section of anti-aircraft guns, and 3 Junkers Ju 52s.

== Activities ==
British forces had already begun to counterattack in Iraq. By 15 May, Junck knew that Habforce was on its way to RAF Habbaniya and Kingcol had taken Rutba Fort. Junck sent a lone Heinkel bomber to find "Kingcol" at Rutba. The bomber found and attacked Kingcol, which alerted the British of the German military assistance to the Iraqis. On the same day, von Blomberg was sent by Junck to Baghdad to make arrangements for a council of war with the Iraqi government. The council was planned for 17 May. However, von Blomberg was killed by friendly fire from Iraqi positions. His Heinkel He 111 was shot at from the ground as it flew low on approach and he was found to be dead upon landing. (Note: Lyman indicates von Blomberg was shot down by Iraqi troops while Kurowski indicates that he was shot when Arab tribesmen fired into the air and was found to be dead upon landing)

Junck visited Baghdad in place of von Blomberg on 16 May. He met Dr. Grobba, Rashid Ali, General Amin Zaki, Colonel Nur ed-Din Mahmud, and Mahmud Salman. The group agreed on a number of priorities for Fliegerführer Irak. The first was to prevent Kingcol from reaching RAF Habbaniya. The second was for Iraqi ground forces to take Habbaniya with air support provided by Fliegerführer Irak. It was also very important to the Germans to provide the Royal Iraqi Army with a "spine straightening". Much of the RIrA was known to be terrified of bombing by British aircraft. On the same day, Junck arranged for a raid by Fliegerführer Irak on Habbaniya. Six Messerschmitt Bf 110s and 3 Heinkel He 111s attacked the base, which took the Royal Air Force (RAF) personnel there by surprise. A number of RAF servicemen were killed on the ground and an Audax and Gladiator were destroyed. A German Heinkel was also lost.

On 17 May, three Messerschmitt Bf 110s attacked an extended column of Kingcol in the open desert. Luckily for the British, the fighters had not attacked the previous day when many vehicles were caught up to the axles in soft sand. On the same day, the RAF attacked the Germans in Mosul with two cannon-firing, long-range Hawker Hurricanes which had arrived unannounced from Egypt, and six Bristol Blenheim bombers from No. 84 Squadron. The RAF lost one Hurricane, with two German aircraft being destroyed and four damaged. In addition, two Gladiator biplane fighters from Habbaniya encountered two Messerschmitt 110s attempting to take off from Rashid Airfield in Baghdad. Both Messerschmitts were destroyed. By 18 May, Junck's force had been whittled down to 8 Messerschmitt Bf 110s, 4 Heinkel He 111s, and 2 Junkers Ju 52s. This represented a roughly 30 percent loss of his original force. With few replacements available, no spares, poor fuel, and aggressive British attacks, this rate of attrition did not bode well for Fliegerführer Irak. By the end of May, Junck had lost 14 Messerschmitts and 5 Heinkels.

Hitler's orders regarding Iraq

The Arab Freedom Movement in the Middle East is our natural ally against England. In this connection special importance is attached to the liberation of Iraq ... I have therefore decided to move forward in the Middle East by supporting Iraq.

— Führer Directive No. 30, 23 May 1941

Hitler, in support of the Iraqi insurrection, issued Führer Directive No. 30 on 23 May. On 27 May, twelve Italian Fiat CR.42 biplane fighters of the Regia Aeronautica (Royal Italian Air Force) arrived in Mosul to operate under German command. By 29 May, Italian aircraft were reported over Baghdad. According to Winston Churchill, the Italian aircraft accomplished nothing. Other reports state that they actually arrived in time to take part in the final air battle of the Iraq campaign on 29 May, scoring victories against No. 94 Squadron RAF.

Grobba sent a panicked message from Baghdad to Berlin on 28 May reporting that British forces with more than "one hundred tanks" were closing in on the city. By then, Junck had no serviceable Messerschmitt Bf 110s and only two Heinkel He 111s with just four bombs between them. The German military mission to Iraq left under cover of darkness on 29 May. Dr. Grobba himself fled Iraq the next day.

== List of commanders ==
No.	Portrait	Commander	Took office	Left office	Time in office	Defence branch
1	Hans Jeschonnek	Generaloberst; Hans Jeschonnek (1899–1943); Stationed in Europe	6 May 1941	29 May 1941	23 days	Luftwaffe
2	Werner Junck	Generalleutnant; Werner Junck (1895–1976); Stationed in Iraq	6 May 1941	29 May 1941	23 days	Luftwaffe

== See also ==
- Italian bombing of Mandatory Palestine in World War II
- Syria–Lebanon campaign
- Martin Drewes
- Paul Zorner
- Wilhelm Herget
- Abwehr
- Kampfgeschwader 4
- Zerstörergeschwader 76
