= Fritz Grobba =

German diplomat (1886–1973)

Fritz Konrad Ferdinand Grobba (18 July 1886 – 2 September 1973) was a German diplomat during the interwar period and World War II.

== Early life ==
He was born in Gartz on the Oder in the Province of Brandenburg, Germany. His parents were Rudolf Grobba, a nurseryman, and Elise Grobba, born Weyer. He attended elementary and high school in Gartz. Grobba studied law, economics and Oriental languages at the University of Berlin. In 1913, he received his doctorate of law. Grobba worked briefly in the German consulate in Jerusalem, Palestine. Palestine was then part of the Ottoman Empire.

== World War I ==
During World War I, Leutnant Grobba fought for the Central Powers, as an officer of the Prussian Army. Grobba fought in France and with the Asia Corps on the Middle Eastern Front.

== Interwar ==
In September 1922, Grobba joined the legal affairs department of the German Foreign Ministry of the Weimar Republic. In January 1923, he was transferred to Department 3 (Abteilung III), the department responsible for the Middle East. In October 1923, when postwar diplomatic relations were established between Weimar Germany and the Emirate of Afghanistan, Grobba was named Germany's representative in Kabul, with the rank of consul. In 1925, when the government of Emir Amanullah Khan accused him of attempting to help a visiting German geographer escape from Afghanistan shortly after the geographer shot and killed an Afghan citizen near Kabul, Grobba denied the charge. There was a diplomatic crisis between Germany and Afghanistan over the role of Grobba.

In April 1926, Grobba was recalled to Berlin. From 1926 to 1932, Grobba served again in Abteilung III. He was now in charge of the section responsible for Iran, Afghanistan and British India.

=== Ambassador to Iraq and Saudi Arabia ===
From October 1932, he was appointed as the German ambassador to the Kingdom of Iraq and was sent to Baghdad. Grobba was able to speak both Turkish and Arabic. He frequently spoke of Arab nationalism and of ousting the British from the Middle East. Grobba purchased a Christian-owned newspaper, "The Arab World" (al-'Alam al-'Arabi). He serialised an Arabic version of Adolf Hitler's Mein Kampf, and soon, Radio Berlin began to broadcast in Arabic.

On 30 January 1933, Hitler became the chancellor. By the death of President Paul von Hindenburg on 2 August 1934, Hitler and his National Socialist German Workers Party were in full control over Germany.

After the death of King Faisal I on 8 September 1933, Grobba convinced King Ghazi to send a group of Iraqi military officers to Germany for a military simulation. The officers returned home amazed.

Grobba also convinced Ghazi to allow Germany to send 50 German officers to Iraq for war games. Ghazi was convinced to accept German "research expeditions" to Iraq. Unlike the Iraqis, the Germans did not return home but stayed in Iraq for the long term.

Grobba enthusiastically supported a virulently anti-imperialist group of Iraqi officers, the "Circle of Seven". Its four leading officers were nicknamed the "Golden Square". They would represent real power, as successive Iraqi governments sought the support of the military for survival. They had long looked to Germany to support them, which Grobba enthusiastically encouraged.

In 1938, a main British pipeline in Iraq was attacked and set on fire by Arabs. When the attack was claimed to be connected to Grobba, he was forced to flee. Grobba fled to the court of King Ibn Saud of Saudi Arabia. Since 1937, Ibn Saud was reported to be "on the outs" with the British, and, in 1939, his emissary was reported to be seeking arms in Germany. From November 1938 to September 1939, Grobba was also the German Ambassador to the Kingdom of Saudi Arabia.

== Beginning of World War II ==
On 1 September 1939, Nazi Germany occupied Poland and World War II began. On 3 September, the United Kingdom and France declared war on Germany. After Germany and the United Kingdom became enemies, the Kingdom of Iraq deported German officials and broke off diplomatic relations with Germany. However, contrary to Article 4 of the Anglo-Iraqi Treaty of 1930, Prime Minister Nuri Said chose not to have Iraq declare war on Germany despite Article 4: "Should ... either of the High Contracting Parties become engaged in war, the other High Contracting Party will ... immediately come to his aid in the capacity of an ally." In addition to refusing to declare war, Said also announced that Iraqi armed forces would not be employed outside of Iraq.

On 31 March 1940, Said was replaced by Rashid Ali as prime minister. On 10 June, when Fascist Italy joined the war, on the side of Germany and against Britain, the Iraqi government under Ali did not break off diplomatic relations with Italy. That violated Article 4 of the Anglo-Iraqi Treaty. On 3 February 1941, after much tension and calls for his removal, he was replaced as prime minister by Taha al-Hashimi, a candidate acceptable to Ali and the members of the "Golden Square".

From October 1939 to May 1941, Grobba served in the German foreign ministry in Berlin.

== Iraqi coup ==
On 1 April 1941, Rashid Ali and members of the "Golden Square" led a coup d'état in Iraq. During the time leading up to the coup d'état, Rashid Ali's supporters had been informed that Germany was willing to recognize the independence of Iraq from the British Empire, there had also been discussions on war material being sent to support the Iraqis and other Arab factions in fighting the British.

== War in Iraq ==
On 2 May 1941, after much tension between the Rashid Ali government and the British, the besieged forces at RAF Habbaniya under Air Vice-Marshal H. G. Smart launched pre-emptive air strikes against Iraqi forces throughout Iraq and the Anglo-Iraqi War began. On 3 May, German Foreign Minister Joachim von Ribbentrop persuaded Hitler that Fritz Grobba be secretly returned to Iraq to head up a diplomatic mission to channel support to the Rashid Ali regime. Grobba was to return under the alias "Franz Gehrke". Grobba's mission was to be sent to Iraq along with a military mission commanded by the High Command in the Armed Forces (Oberkommando der Wehrmacht, or OKW). The military mission had the cover name "Special Staff F" (Sonderstab F) and it included Brandenburgers and a Luftwaffe component. Sonderstab F was commanded by General Hellmuth Felmy.

On 6 May, Luftwaffe Colonel Werner Junck received instructions in Berlin that he was to take a small force of aircraft to Iraq. While under Junck's tactical direction, the force was to be under the overall direction of Lieutenant General Hans Jeschonnek and was to be known as "Airplane Commander for Iraq" (Fliegerführer Irak). The aircraft of Fliegerführer Irak were to have Iraqi markings and they were to operate out of an air base in Mosul, some 390 kilometres (240 miles) north of Baghdad.

Also on 6 May, Grobba and his mission flew from Foggia to Rhodes in two Heinkel He 111 bombers which were dubbed the "Führer Courier Squadron". The mission was accompanied by two Messerschmitt Bf 110 fighters. On 9 May, they reached Aleppo in Vichy French-held Syria. On 10 May, the mission reached Mosul and after contacting the Iraqi government, Grobba was told to come to Baghdad as soon as was possible. On 11 May, they reached Baghdad.

On 16 May, Grobba met in Baghdad with Colonel Junck, Rashid Ali, General Amin Zaki, Colonel Nur ed-Din Mahmud, and Mahmud Salman. The group agreed to a number of priorities for Fliegerführer Irak. The first priority was to prevent the British flying column Kingcol from relieving RAF Habbaniya. The second priority was for Iraqi ground forces to take Habbaniyah with air support provided by Fliegerführer Irak. An overall priority for the Germans was to provide the Iraqi Army with a "spine straightening". Much of the army was known to be terrified of bombing by British aircraft.

In the end, Fliegerführer Irak failed to make the impact envisioned by the Germans, RAF Habbaniya was not taken by the Iraqi ground forces, and whether or not the Germans stopped Kingcol did not matter. The air and ground forces at the besieged air base drove off the Iraqis before Kingcol arrived. On 7 May, RAF armoured cars confirmed that the Iraqis on the escarpment above the base were gone. It was not until 18 May that Kingcol arrived to "relieve" Habbaniya. By 22 May, British and Commonwealth ground forces advancing from Habbaniya took and held Fallujah for good. They then began the advance on Baghdad.

On 28 May, Grobba sent a panicked message from Baghdad reporting that the British were close to the city with more than 100 tanks. By then, Junck had no serviceable Messerschmitt Bf 110 fighters and only two Heinkel He 111 bombers with just four bombs between them. Late on 29 May, Rashid Ali, several of his key supporters, and the German military mission fled, under cover of darkness. On 30 May, Grobba fled Baghdad.

Grobba's escape took him through Mosul and then through Vichy French-held Syria. A British flying column commanded by Major R. E. S. Gooch and nicknamed Gocol was created to pursue and capture Grobba. To accomplish this, Gocol first made its way to Mosul and arrived there 3 June. The column then drove west and illegally entered French territory, just prior to the commencement of the Syria-Lebanon Campaign. During the week following 7 June Gocol made efforts to capture Grobba. The column entered Qamishli in Syria, fully expecting to capture him there, but found that Grobba had already been and gone. In the end, Gocol failed in its mission, and Grobba escaped to Nazi occupied Europe.

== Later life ==
In February 1942, Grobba was named foreign ministry plenipotentiary for the Arab States, a job that entailed liaison between the German government and Arab exiles in Berlin such as Mohammad Amin al-Husayni. In December 1942, Grobba was named to the Paris branch of the German archives commission. He held the post until his brief return to the foreign ministry in April 1944.

In June 1944, Grobba was officially retired from the foreign ministry. However, he continued to work there until the end of the year. In 1945, Grobba worked briefly in the economics department of the government of Saxony, in Dresden.

At the end of the war, Grobba was captured and was kept in Soviet captivity until 1955.

== Memoirs ==
In his 1957 memoirs, Men and Power in the Orient, Grobba summarized as "wasted opportunities" the Middle East policy of Germany during the 1930s. He thought that Germany did not take enough advantage of the Arab hostility towards both the United Kingdom and France. According to Grobba, Germany's failure in the Middle East tracked directly to Hitler; Grobba claimed that as Hitler was uninterested in the Middle East, he deferred to Italian interests in the Mediterranean area against the British.

Grobba also claimed that Hitler also expressed a disinclination to totally eliminate all of the power of the British. Ultimately, Grobba indicated that Hitler was never willing to lend his support to Arab independence and national self-determination.

== See also ==
- Führer Directive No. 30: German Intervention in Iraq
- Ahnenerbe - A Nazi German think tank that promoted itself as a "study society for intellectual ancient history".
- Farhud - A violent pogrom against the Jews of Baghdad, Iraq on 1 and 2 June 1941.
- Werner Otto von Hentig - A bitter rival of Grobba; whereas Grobba belonged to a faction in the Foreign Office that favored the massive incitement of Muslims to jihad in the British and French colonial empires and the Soviet Union, Hentig opposed it.
- Franz von Papen - German ambassador to Turkey from 1939 to 1944.
- Fawzi al-Qawuqji - An Arab nationalist who fought against the British and the French in the British Mandate of Palestine, the French Mandate of Syria, and the Kingdom of Iraq.
- Mohammad Amin al-Husayni

== Notes ==
=== Bibliography ===
- Al-Marashi, Ibrahim; Salama, Sammy (2008). Iraq's armed forces: An analytical history. Oxon and New York: Routledge. pp. 254. ISBN 978-0-415-40078-7.
- Kurowski, Franz (2005). The Brandenburger Commandos: Germany's Elite Warrior Spies in World War II. Mechanicsburg, Pennsylvania: Stackpole Book. ISBN 978-0-8117-3250-5. ISBN 0-8117-3250-9.
- Leatherdale, Clive (1983). Britain and Saudi Arabia, 1925-1939: The Imperial Oasis. Frank Cass & Co Ltd. ISBN 0-7146-3220-1.
- Lukutz, Liora (1995). Iraq: The Search for National Identity. Routledge Publishing. p. 256. ISBN 0-7146-4128-6.
- Lyman, Robert (2006). Iraq 1941: The Battles for Basra, Habbaniya, Fallujah and Baghdad. Campaign. Oxford, New York: Osprey Publishing. pp. 96. ISBN 1-84176-991-6.
- Mackenzie, Compton. Eastern Epic: Volume 1 September 1939-March 1943 Defence. London: Chatto & Windus. OCLC 59637091.
- Nicosia, Francis R. (1985). The Third Reich and the Palestine Question. London: I. B. Taurus & Co. Ltd. p. 190. ISBN 1-85043-010-1. ISBN 076580624X.
- Playfair, Major-General I.S.O.; with Flynn R.N., Captain F.C.; Molony, Brigadier C.J.C. & Toomer, Air Vice-Marshal S.E. (2004) [1st. pub. HMSO 1956]. Butler (ed.). The Mediterranean and Middle East, Volume II The Germans come to the help of their Ally (1941). History of the Second World War, United Kingdom Military Series. Naval & Military Press. ISBN 1-84574-066-1.
- Kaufman, Asher; Ma'oz, Moshe; Podeh, Elie (2006). Arab-Jewish Relations: From Conflict to Resolution. Chichester: Sussex Academic Press. p. 386. ISBN 1-903900-68-9.
- Simon, Reeva Spector (1986). Iraq: Between the Two World Wars. New York and Colchester, West Sussex: Columbia University Press.
- Tripp, Charles (2002). A History of Iraq. Cambridge: Press Syndicate of the University of Cambridge. p. 311. ISBN 978-0-521-52900-6.
