= 41st Infantry Division (Wehrmacht) =

- Division Insignia
- Active: January – May 1945
- Country: Nazi Germany
- Branch: Heer (Wehrmacht)
- Type: Infantry
- Size: Division

The 41st Infantry Division (German: 41. Infanteriedivision), formerly the 41st Fortress Division (41. Festungdivision), was a German Army infantry division in World War II. It was employed on occupation duties in southern Greece, and surrendered to the Yugoslav partisans at the end of the war.

== History ==
Founded as the 41st Fortress Division, this unit was formed in Bruck an der Mur in December 1943, with its command staff being formed from the cadre of the defunct 39th Infantry Division, and was ready for duty at the start of 1944 at a strength of 22 battalions. In its initial deployment, it was to defend the Peloponnese peninsula of Greece as a coastal component of LXVIII Army Corps, attached to the Army Group F under General Hellmuth Felmy.

The 733rd Grenadier Regiment was attached to the division in September 1944, after it was separated from its parent 133rd Fortress Division during the evacuation of Crete. On the 28th it was located in Thebes, though this was only learned by Allied decrypters the following month. It operated in the army group's rear guard during the German retreat from Corinth, being attacked by royalist guerrillas and elements of the British 2nd Parachute Brigade, with minor skirmishes taking place as the division moved through Yugoslavia.

The division was restructured as an infantry division in January 1945, and engaged the Soviet Army as such along the Sava and Drava rivers. The 41st was then put under the command of the 117th Jäger Division. The 41st surrendered to the 11th Yugoslav Shock Division near Zagreb on May 8, 1945.

== Commanders ==
Date	Rank	Commander
20 November 1943 - 27 April 1944	Generalleutnant	Franz Krech
27 April 1944 - 1 August 1944	Generalleutnant	Franz Benicke
1 August 1944 - May 1945	Generalleutnant	Wolfgang Hauser

== Order of battle ==
In its initial formation, the division was two full regiments in strength. It was expanded further in 1944, and even more in 1945.

September 1944

- 141st Divisional Supply Troops
- 141st Engineer Battalion
- 141st Fusilier Battalion
- 141st Signal Battalion
- 309th Army Anti-Aircraft Battalion
- 733rd Grenadier Regiment
- 919th Army Coastal Artillery Regiment
- 938th Grenadier Regiment
- 965th Grenadier Regiment
- 1009th Fortress Infantry Battalion

1945

- 1230th Grenadier Regiment
- 1231st Grenadier Regiment
- 1232nd Grenadier Regiment
- 41st Füsilier-Bataillon
- 141st Artillery Regiment
- 141st Pioneer Bataillon
- 141st Panzerjäger-Abteilung
- 141st Nachrichten-Abteilung
- 141st Feldersatz-Bataillon
- 141st Versorgungseinheiten

== Notes ==
- Dunn, Walter Scott (2003). Heroes Or Traitors: The German Replacement Army, the July Plot, and Adolf Hitler. Greenwood Publishing Group.
- Hinsley, Francis Harry. British Intelligence in the Second World War: Its Influence on Strategy and Operations, Volume 3, Part 2. Cambridge University Press.
- Mitcham, Samuel W. (2007). German Order of Battle, Volume 1: 1st-290th Infantry Divisions in World War II. Stackpole Books.
- Mitcham, Samuel W. (2007). The German Defeat in the East: 1944-45. Stackpole Books.
- Muñoz, Antonio J. (2001). The east came west: Muslim, Hindu and Buddhist volunteers in the German armed forces, 1941-1945. Axis Europa Books.
- Thomas, Nigel (2012). The German Army 1939-45 (2): North Africa & Balkans. Osprey Publishing.
