= LXVIII Army Corps (Wehrmacht) =

Military unit

The LXVIII Army Corps (German: LXVIII. Armeekorps) was an army corps of the German Wehrmacht during World War II. The corps was initially formed in April 1943.

== History ==
The LXVIII Army Corps, initially known as Generalkommando z.b.V. LXVIII, General Command for special deployment 68, was formed on 9 April 1943 from the personnel of the Generalkommando z.b.V. which had been formed on 23 September 1942 from personnel that had served on Special Staff F as part of the German support for the insurgents in Iraq in the Anglo-Iraqi War. The first corps commander of LXVIII General Command was Hellmuth Felmy.

The LXVIII General Command was moved to Army Group E, part of Army Group F, (Note: While nominally an army group, Army Group E was subordinate to Army Group F and effectively fulfilled the role of a field army between 26 August 1943 and 25 March 1945.) in late May 1943 and set up its headquarters in Athens. In June 1943, the staff had not yet been assigned divisions but stood by in the reserves of Army Group E. By 7 July, it had been assigned the 1st Panzer Division and the 117th Jäger Division. The LXVIII General Command remained in charge of these two divisions until late October 1943. In September, the two divisions were briefly joined by the 29th Infantry Division "Piemonte" and the 59th Infantry Division "Cagliari" of the Kingdom of Italy as part of the short-lived 11th Italian Army. After that, the LXVIII General Command was once again transferred to Army Group E. By 8 November 1943, the 1st Panzer Division had been transferred away and the 11th Luftwaffe Field Division and the Brandenburgers had joined the corps.

The exact organizational composition of the LXVIII General Command between January and March 1944 is unclear, as the administrative papers are lost to history.

Documents are once again available starting on 15 April, at which point the LXVIII General Command consisted of the 117th Jäger Division, the 11th Luftwaffe Field Division and the newly added 41st Infantry Division. The Brandenburgers had been transferred away. This composition stayed consisted until 31 August 1944. By 16 September, the 11th Luftwaffe Field Division had been transferred away, leaving only the 117th Jäger Division and the 41st Infantry Division.

The staff was renamed to become LXVIII Army Corps on 30 September 1943.

The 117th Jäger Division was also removed from the LXVIII Army Corps in September, leaving only the 41st Infantry Division by 13 October 1944. Subsequently, the LXVIII Army Corps was itself transferred and was taken from Army Group E to the 2nd Panzer Army. Here, it was reunited with the 117th Jäger Division and further strengthened by the 118th Jäger Division and the 1st Mountain Division by 5 November. The 41st Infantry Division was not passed along with the transfer and was thus no longer part of the corps. By 26 November, the 118th Jäger Division and 1st Mountain Division had left the corps, whereas the 44th Infantry Division as well as the 13th and 31st SS Divisions had been added.

Felmy was succeeded as corps commander by Friedrich-Wilhelm Müller on 8 December 1944.

By 31 December, the 117th Jäger Division as well as the 31st SS Division had left the corps, whereas the 71st Infantry Division had been added. This left the 44th and 71st Infantry Divisions as well as the 13th SS Division going into the new year 1945.

Müller was succeeded as corps commander by Rudolf Konrad on 29 January 1945.

By 19 February, the 44th Infantry Division had left the corps, leaving only the 13th SS Division and the 71st Infantry Division. This stayed unchanged through 1 March. By 12 April, the 297th Infantry Division was added.

By 7 May 1945, one day before German surrender in World War II, the 297th Infantry Division had left the corps and the 118th Jäger Division had rejoined. Thus, the LXVIII Army Corps consisted of the 13th SS Division, the 71st Infantry Division and the 118th Jäger Division when World War II ended.

== Structure ==
Organizational structure of the LXVIII (68th) Army Corps of the Wehrmacht
Year	Date	Commander	Subordinate units	Army	Army Group	Operational area
1943	1 June	Hellmuth Felmy	None	Army Group E	Army Group F	Athens
1943	7 July	Hellmuth Felmy	1st Panzer, 117th Jäger	Army Group E	Army Group F	Athens
1943	5 August	Hellmuth Felmy	1st Panzer, 117th Jäger	Army Group E	Army Group F	Athens
1943	September	Hellmuth Felmy	1st Panzer, 117th Jäger, 29th Italian Infantry, 59th Italian Infantry	11th Italian Army	Army Group F	Athens
1943	4 October	Hellmuth Felmy	1st Panzer, 117th Jäger	Army Group E	Army Group F	Athens
1943	8 November	Hellmuth Felmy	117th Jäger, 11th LFD, Brandenburgers	Army Group E	Army Group F	Athens
1943	3 December	Hellmuth Felmy	117th Jäger, 11th LFD, Brandenburgers	Army Group E	Army Group F	Athens
1944	January	Hellmuth Felmy	Unknown	Army Group E	Army Group F	Athens
1944	February	Hellmuth Felmy	Unknown	Army Group E	Army Group F	Athens
1944	March	Hellmuth Felmy	Unknown	Army Group E	Army Group F	Athens
1944	15 April	Hellmuth Felmy	117th Jäger, 11th LFD, 41st Infantry	Army Group E	Army Group F	Athens
1944	15 May	Hellmuth Felmy	117th Jäger, 11th LFD, 41st Infantry	Army Group E	Army Group F	Athens
1944	17 June	Hellmuth Felmy	117th Jäger, 11th LFD, 41st Infantry	Army Group E	Army Group F	Athens
1944	15 July	Hellmuth Felmy	117th Jäger, 11th LFD, 41st Infantry	Army Group E	Army Group F	Athens
1944	31 August	Hellmuth Felmy	117th Jäger, 11th LFD, 41st Infantry	Army Group E	Army Group F	Athens
1944	16 September	Hellmuth Felmy	117th Jäger, 41st Infantry	Army Group E	Army Group F	Athens
1944	13 October	Hellmuth Felmy	41st Infantry	Army Group E	Army Group F	Athens
1944	5 November	Hellmuth Felmy	Brdbg., 117th Jäger, 118th Jäger, 1st Mountain	2nd Panzer Army	Army Group F	Serbia, Hungary (Drava)
1944	26 November	Hellmuth Felmy	Brdbg., 117th Jäger, 13th SS, 31st SS, 44th Infantry	2nd Panzer Army	Army Group F	Serbia, Hungary (Drava)
1944	31 December	Friedrich-Wilhelm Müller	44th Infantry, 71st Infantry, 13th SS	2nd Panzer Army	Army Group F	Serbia, Hungary (Drava)
1945	19 February	Rudolf Konrad	13th SS, 71st Infantry	2nd Panzer Army	Army Group South	Hungary (Drava)
1945	1 March	Rudolf Konrad	13th SS, 71st Infantry	2nd Panzer Army	Army Group South	Hungary (Drava)
1945	12 April	Rudolf Konrad	13th SS, 71st Infantry, 297th Infantry	2nd Panzer Army	Army Group South	Hungary (Drava)
1945	7 May	Rudolf Konrad	13th SS, 71st Infantry, 118th Jäger	2nd Panzer Army	Oberbefehlshaber Südost	Styria

== Noteworthy individuals ==
- Hellmuth Felmy, corps commander of LXVIII Army Corps (May 1943 – 8 December 1944).
- Friedrich-Wilhelm Müller, corps commander of LXVIII Army Corps (8 December 1944 – 29 January 1945).
- Rudolf Konrad, corps commander of LXVIII Army Corps (29 January 1945 – May 1945).
