= Führer Directive No. 30 =

1941 directive of Adolf Hitler ordering German support for Arab nationalists in Iraq

Führer Directive No. 30 (German: Weisung Nr. 30) was a May 1941 directive issued by German dictator Adolf Hitler during World War II. It ordered German support for Iraqi Arab nationalists, who were fighting the British.

== Background ==
Führer Directive No. 30 dealt with German intervention in support of Arab nationalists in the Kingdom of Iraq. During the 1930s, representatives of Nazi Germany and Fascist Italy attempted to gain favor with various Iraqi nationalists and promised support against the British. On 1 April 1941, Rashid Ali and members of the pro-Axis "Golden Square" staged a coup d'etat against the pro-British government of Regent Abd al-Ilah. On 2 May, after tensions mounted on both sides, the British launched pre-emptive air strikes against Iraqi forces and the Anglo-Iraqi War began. Rashid Ali immediately requested that the Germans make good on the earlier promises of assistance.

== Full text ==
On 23 May 1941, Hitler issued Führer Directive No. 30 which said:

1. The Arab Freedom Movement is our natural ally against England in the Middle East. In this context the uprising in Iraq is of special importance. This strengthens the forces hostile to England in the Middle East beyond the Iraqi frontier, disrupts English communications, and ties up English troops and shipping at the expense of other theaters.
I have therefore decided to hasten developments in the Middle East by supporting Iraq. Whether and how it may be possible, in conjunction with an offensive against the Suez Canal, finally to break the British position between the Mediterranean and the Persian Gulf is a question that will be answered only after Barbarossa.
2. In connection with my decision I order the following for the support of Iraq: (a) Support by the air force. (b) Dispatch of a military mission. (c) Arms deliveries.
3. The military mission (cover name – Special Staff F) will be under the command of General [Hellmuth] Felmy. Its tasks are: (a) To advise and support the Iraqi armed forces. (b) Where possible, to establish military contacts with forces hostile to England outside of Iraq. (c) To obtain experience and intelligence in this area for the German armed forces. The composition of this organization will be regulated, in accordance with these duties, by the Chief of the High Command in the Armed Forces. Chain of command will be as follows: (a) All armed forces personnel sent to Iraq, including liaison staff in Syria, will be under the command of the head of the military mission with the proviso that orders and guidelines for the aviation units will come exclusively from the High Command of the Air Force. (b) The head of the military mission will be subordinate to the Chief of the High Command in the Armed Forces, with the proviso that orders and guidelines for the aviation units will come exclusively from the High Command of the Air Force. (c) The members of the military mission are, for the time being, to be regarded as volunteers (in the manner of the Condor Legion). They will wear tropical uniforms with Iraqi badges. Also, Iraqi markings will be worn by German aircraft.
4. The Air Force: The employment of the air force in limited numbers is intended, apart from direct effects, to increase the self-confidence and fighting spirit of the Iraqi people and armed forces.
5. Arms Deliveries: The Chief of the High Command in the Armed Forces will issue the necessary orders in this respect. (Deliveries to be made from Syria, in accordance with the agreement reached with the French in this matter, and from Germany.)
6. The direction of propaganda in the Middle East is the responsibility of the Foreign Office, which will cooperate with the High Command in the Armed Forces, Operations Staff – Propaganda Section. The basic idea of our propaganda is: The victory of the Axis will free the countries of the Middle East from the English yoke, and will give them the right to self-determination. All who love freedom will therefore join the fight against England. No propaganda is to be carried out against the French in Syria.
7. Should members of the Italian Armed Forces be employed on duties in Iraq, German personnel will cooperate on the lines laid down in this directive. Efforts will be made to ensure that they come under the command of the Head of the German Military Mission.

The Supreme Commander of the Armed Forces
signed: Adolf Hitler

== See also ==
- List of Adolf Hitler's directives
- Brandenburgers
- Flyer Command Iraq
- Wilhelm Keitel – Chief of the High Command of the German Armed Forces
- Hermann Göring – Head of the High Command of the German Air Force
- Joachim von Ribbentrop – Head of the German Foreign Office
- Fritz Grobba – German Ambassador to Iraq and Saudi Arabia
