= Hermann Frommherz =

German aviator (1891–1964)

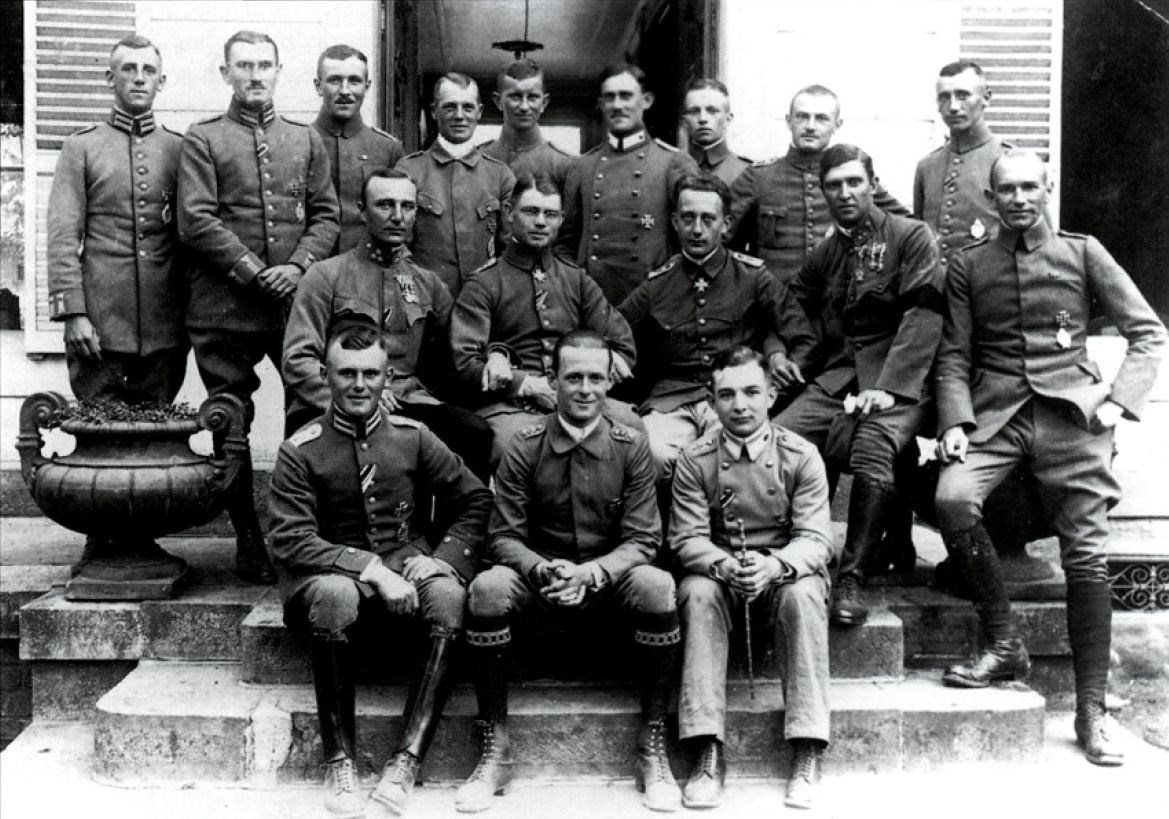
- Frommherz (back row, second on the left) photographed with Jasta 2
- Born: 10 August 1891; Waldshut, Germany
- Died: 30 December 1964 (aged 73); Waldshut, Germany
- Military career
- Allegiance: German Empire; Weimar Republic;3rd Reich
- Branch: Luftstreitkräfte; Luftwaffe
- Service years: 1911 – 1945
- Rank: Generalmajor
- Awards: Military Order of St. Henry; Royal House Order of Hohenzollern; Military Karl-Friedrich Merit Order

Generalmajor (Major General) Hermann Frommherz (10 August 1891 – 30 December 1964) Military Order of St. Henry, Royal House Order of Hohenzollern, Knight's Cross of the Military Karl-Friedrich Merit Order, began his military career in World War I as a German ace fighter pilot. He was credited with 32 victories. During World War II he was involved in the German takeover of Czechoslovakia and rose to become a Luftwaffe Generalmajor.

== Early life ==
Hermann Frommherz was born in Waldshut, in the Baden region of Germany near the Swiss border. He studied engineering in Stuttgart. In late 1911, he joined the Mecklenburg-Schwerin Jäger-Bataillon Nr. 14 in the Prussian Army. In the reserves when World War I began, he was mobilized in July 1914. He served in France with Regiment Nr. 14 and was promoted to Vizefeldwebel (non-commissioned officer). He was transferred to Infantry Regiment Nr. 250, which went into combat in Russia. Frommherz earned the Second Class Iron Cross in February 1915. By April 1915, he was with the 113th Infantry Regiment. On 1 June 1915, he transferred to aviation service.

== World War I aerial service ==
Frommherz began as a two-seater pilot with the Luftstreitkräfte's Kampfstaffel (Tactical Bomber Squadron) 20 of Kagohl IV, at the Battle of Verdun and over the Somme River. He was commissioned as a Leutnant on 1 August 1916. Kasta 20 then moved to serve in Romania in December 1916, before being posted onward to Macedonia and Thessaloniki, Greece.

On 3 March 1917, Frommherz was assigned to Jagdstaffel 2; this elite squadron had been led by aviation tactical and strategic pioneer Oswald Boelcke and had been named for him after he was killed in action. Flying a light blue Albatros D.III nicknamed "Blaue Maus", Frommherz scored his first victory on 11 April 1917 – a No 23 Squadron RFC SPAD VII – and a Royal Aircraft Factory BE 2e as his second on the 14th. Both times, he forced the plane to land and the English pilot or crew were taken prisoner.

Frommherz was injured in a crash on 1 May 1917. By October, when he had recovered, he was seconded to instructor duty with FEA 3. In December, he received Lübeck's Hanseatic Cross.

Upon Frommherz's return on 1 March 1918 to Jasta 2 to fly a Fokker Dr.I Triplane on 1 March 1918, he began a string of 30 victories that ran from 3 June 1918 until the war's end. He had two victories in June, six each in July and August, ten in September, four in October, and two on 4 November. Notable among his kills were the half dozen against the formidable Bristol F.2 Fighters. In the midst of his victory string, on 29 July 1918, he succeeded Hermann Göring as commanding officer of Jagdstaffel 27.

Leutnant Frommherz had a good reputation as a commanding officer. Ernst de Ridder, when newly assigned to the Jasta, claimed he was allowed to retrain himself from the Fokker Dr.1 to the Fokker D.VII, then nurse-maided into combat with an experienced pilot to watch over him. As de Ridder stated, "He was so concerned about his boys." When de Ridder was wounded, Frommherz brought de Ridder's newly awarded Iron Cross to the hospital.

De Ridder left a description of Frommherz's Fokker D.VII insignia. It consisted of the yellow nose and tail common to his Jasta, along with red and black chevrons of a Staffelführer (squadron leader) painted on top of the upper wing.

Frommherz's blooming career now garnered him the Knight's Cross with Swords of the House Order of Hohenzollern on 30 September 1918, when his victory total stood at 26. The following month, he received the Knight's Cross of the Grand Duchy of Baden's Karl Friedrich Military Merit Order. At some point, he had also been awarded the Knight's Cross of the Military Order of Saint Henry from the Kingdom of Saxony. Frommherz was also nominated for the Pour le Merite, having scored the required 20 victories; however, the award was still unapproved upon the Kaiser's abdication. Despite this non-award, Frommherz was seen wearing the decoration after the war; he had certainly fulfilled the criteria for it.

== After World War I ==
Postwar, Frommherz was active in the German Police Aviation Service. He also flew mail for Deutsche Luftreederei, a predecessor to Deutsche Luft Hansa. In 1920, he returned to Baden as technical chief at the new airfield at Lorach.

Beginning in 1922, the German high command ran a secret training site at Lipetsk in the Soviet Union. Frommherz became an instructor there in 1925. He was also an instructor in China. From 1931 to 1932, he taught the pilots of Chiang Kai-shek's new air force fighter tactics.

Frommherz returned to Germany to join the nascent Luftwaffe. He was Commanding Officer of I Gruppe, Jagdgeschwader 134 ("Horst Wessel") from September 1938 until 1 November 1938 as Oberstleutnant; when it was reconstituted as JG 142, he continued in command until the first day of 1939. As such, he was involved in the German invasion and conquest of Czechoslovakia, which had the code name Fall Grün (Case Green).

As a Major General, he was Commander of Jagdfliegerführer Deutsche Bucht from 1 April until 30 September 1942, following Werner Junck.

== Post World War II ==
Hermann Frommherz returned to civic affairs in his native town of Waldshut. He died of a heart attack on 30 December 1964.

== See also ==
- Jagdfliegerführer Deutsche Bucht Accessed 6 November 2008.

Military offices
Preceded by Generalleutnant Werner Junck	Commander of Jagdfliegerführer Deutsche Bucht; 1 April 1942 – 30 September 1942	Succeeded by Oberst Karl Hentschel
