= Muhammad ibn Khalil al-Qawuqji =

Lebanese Hanafi scholar

- Born: 1809 AD; Tripoli
- Died: 1888 AD (78-79 years old)
- Occupations: Scholar, Preacher, Jurist

Mohammed ibn Khalil al-Qawuqji (Arabic: محمد بن خليل القاوقجي) (1809 - 1888) was a Lebanese Hanafi scholar, preacher and jurist.

== Biography ==
=== Descent and Descendants ===
He is Mohammed ibn Khalil ibn Ibrahim ibn Mohammed ibn Ali ibn Mohammed Shams al-Din al-Hasani al-Mashishi al-Tarabulsi, known as Abu al-Mahasin al-Qawuqji in relation to al-Qawuq. Qawuq was a nickname for one of his grandfathers. His grandfather was nicknamed by this name because he made a Qawuq and gifted it to the Ottoman Sultan Mustafa Khan. After that, the grandfather became popular for this reason. Qawuq was a crown kings used to wear. It was later worn by scholars then by public people, but people stopped wearing it later.

The pan-Syrian nationalist and resistance fighter Fawzi al-Qawuqji is his great-grandson.

=== Birth and Education ===
He was born on 12 Rabi’ al-Awwal 1224 AH in the city of Tripoli. His father died when he was young, so he lived as an orphan. He received the principles of Islamic and Arabic sciences in his country. Then he went to Egypt in 1239 AH. He studied at Al-Azhar Mosque and learned from the famous people of his time, like Ibrahim Al-Bajoury, Hasan Al-Quaysini, Mohammed Yusuf Al-Buhi. He recited to them in many fields. He learned mysticism from Sheikh mohammed Salih al-Sibai al-Adawi. He cared about Hadith and its arts, especially Esnad and learned from its well-known scholars like Sheik Mohammad Abed Al-Sendi and others. He became number one in Esnad and Hadith in his time, so he became the goal of the people of his time in this art. After he mastered various sciences, he returned to his country and worked there in teaching. He was preoccupied with Hadith and its sciences and mysticism, so he was regarded as one of the stars of Sufism. Al-Nabhani talked about him in his book (Arabic title:Jame' Karamat Al-Awleya).

=== Works ===
Al-Qawuqji had several books. Abd al-Hay al-Kitani mentioned that he had composed about a hundred books including long and short ones. Zaki Mujahid said in Al-Aalam Al-Sharqia that he wrote about two hundred works and counted 75 books including books in Tafsir and the sciences of the Qur’an like (Arabic title: Masarratu al-Aynain fe Hasheyet al- Jalalains), (Arabic title: Rabee' al-Jenan fe Tafsir a-Quran), (Arabic title: Mawaheb al-Rahman fe Khasa'es al-Quran), (Arabic title: Jamal al-Raqs fe Qera'et Hafs was Sharhuh) and (Arabic title: Ajalet al-Mustafeed fe Ahkam al-Tajweed).

In the hadith and its sciences: (Arabic title: Al-Lu'lu' al-Marsou' fema Qeel Laisa lahu Asl wa Be Asleh Mawdu) which was his most famous book ever, (Arabic title: Al-Jami’ al-Fayyah le al-Kutub al-Thalatha al-Sehah) (i.e. al-Muwatta’, Muslim and al-Bukhari), (Arabic title: al-Dahab al-Abriz Sharh al-Mu’jam al-Wajeez), which is an explanation of (Arabic title: Al-Mujam al-Wajeez men Ahadith al-Rasul al-Aziz) by Abdullah bin Ibrahim al-Marghini who gathered it from (Arabic title: al-Jame' al-Saghir) for al-Suyuti and (Arabic title: Knunz al-Haqaeq)for Mennawi. He also wrote (Arabic title: Resala ala Qawaed al-Islam al-Qams fe al-Hadith), (Arabic title: Redala fe Mustalah al-Hadith), an explanation for "the poem of Gharami Sahih" in terms of Hadith, and (Arabic title: Ma'dan al-La'ale' fe al-Asaneed al-Awali).

In jurisprudence: (Arabic title: Bagheyyatu al-Talibin fima Yajeb men Ahkam al-Deen), and in the four doctrines (Arabic title: Safinatu al-Najat fe Ma'refatu Allah wa Ahkam al-Salat) and its explanation, (Arabic title: Du' al-Manazel fima Wureda men al-Nawafel), (Arabic title: Ghaneyyatu al-Talibin me Ahkam al-Deen) and (Arabic title: Sharh Kefayet al-Ghulam)

In mysticism: (Arabic title: al-burqa al-Dahisha fe Lebs al-Kharqa al-Sufeyya), (Arabic title: Tuhfet al-Muluk fe al-Sair wa alSuluk), (Arabic title: Sharh al-Agroumeyya al Lesan al-Sada al-Sufeyya), (Arabic title: Shawreq al-anwar al-Jaleela fe Asaneed al-Sada al-Shaeleyya), (Arabic title: al-Tour al-Aala Sharh al-Dur al-Aala) for Muhyi al-Deen bin Arabi, which includes the secrets of letters and characteristics of the mentioned party, (Arabic title: Qawed al-Tahqiq fe Asoul ahl al-Tariq) and (Arabic title: Maqased al-suneyyah fe Adab al0Sada al-Sufeyya).

Among his works, also, are (Arabic title: al-Eetemad fe al-Eqteqad), (Arabic title: al-Bahja al-Quduseyya fe al-Ansab al-Nabaweyya), (Arabic title: Resalah fe al-Manteq), (Arabic title: Ruh al-Bayan fe Khawas al-Nabat wa al-Hayawan), (Arabic title: Sharh Adab al-Bahth), (Arabic title: Sharh al-Shafeya le ibn al-Hajeb fe al-Nahu), (Arabic title: Sharh al-Khafi fe Elmai al-Urud wa al-Qawfi), (Arabic title: Fath al-Rahman fe Fadael Ramadan), (Arabic title: Kawakeb al-Tarseef fima Le al-Hanafeyya me al-Tasneef).

=== Death ===
Finally, He died in 1305 AH/ 1888 AD. He was buried in the village of Al-Qalamoun near Tripoli.
