= Society for the Defense of Palestine =

Arab nationalist militia during the 1936–39 Arab revolt in Palestine

- Flag of the Iraqi Kingdom used by the unit
- Leaders: Fawzi al-Qawuqji; Muhammad al-Ashmar
- Dates active: 1936
- Active regions: Nablus–Tulkaram–Jenin triangle, Mandatory Palestine
- Ideology: Arab nationalism
- Size: 200
- Wars: the 1936–39 Arab revolt in Palestine

Society for the Defense of Palestine was a nationalist Arab militia, active during the 1936–1939 Arab revolt in Palestine. The group was composed of Sunni Arab volunteers, mainly coming from Iraq and commanded by Iraqi Fawzi al-Qawuqji.

It was established, when Al-Qawuqji resigned his commission in the Iraqi army and his position at the Royal Military College to lead approximately fifty armed guerrillas into Mandatory Palestine. Deputy commander of the unit was Muhammad al-Ashmar, who commanded an Arab volunteer force's Syrian battalion between August and October 1936.

In August 1936, al-Qawuqji commanded about 200 volunteers from Iraq, Syria, Transjordan, and the Samaria region of Palestine. His title was 'Supreme Commander of the Arab Revolution in South-Syrian Palestine.' He operated four units, (Iraqi, Syrian, Palestinian Druse and Palestinian Muslim) in the Nablus–Tulkaram–Jenin triangle until the end of October 1936. The military performance of al-Qawuqji's troops became hampered by internal dissensions and animosity between him and Grand Mufti Husseini, the Arab Higher Committee, and the Mufti's kinsman Abd al-Qadir al-Husayni, who commanded forces that were active in the area around Jerusalem. On 26 October 1936, al-Qawuqji crossed the Jordan River with his troops into Transjordan. A few weeks later he returned to Iraq.
