= Jagdfliegerführer Deutsche Bucht =

Jagdfliegerführer Deutsche Bucht (Fighter Leader German Bight) was one of the primary divisions of the German Luftwaffe in World War II. It was formed in December 1939 at Jever for the defense of the German Bight. On 1 December 1943, the unit was redesignated Jagdfliegerführer 2 and subordinated to the 2. Jagddivision. The headquarters was located at Jever and from 1943 in Stade.

== Commanding officers ==
=== Fliegerführer ===
- Generalmajor Carl-August Schumacher, December 1939 – 31 July 1941
- Generalleutnant Werner Junck, 1 August 1941 – 31 March 1942
- Generalmajor Hermann Frommherz, 1 April – 30 September 1942
- Oberst Karl Hentschel, 17 August 1942 – 1 October 1943
- Oberst Johann Schalk, 1 October – 1 December 1943
