= Rudolf Konrad =

German general of World War II

- Born: 7 March 1891; Kulmbach
- Died: 10 June 1964 (aged 73); Munich
- Military career
- Allegiance: Nazi Germany
- Branch: German Army
- Service years: 1910–1945
- Rank: General der Gebirgstruppe
- Commands: 7th Mountain Division; XXXXIX Mountain Corps; LXVIII Army Corps
- Conflicts: World War I; World War II; Anschluss; Occupation of Czechoslovakia; Invasion of Poland; Battle of France; Battle of the Caucasus; Kerch–Eltigen Operation; Crimean Offensive (1944); Operation Frühlingserwachen; Vienna Offensive
- Awards: Knight's Cross of the Iron Cross

Rudolf Konrad (7 March 1891 – 10 June 1964) was a German general in the Wehrmacht during World War II who served as a corps commander. He was a recipient of the Knight's Cross of the Iron Cross and, by the end of the war, held the rank of General der Gebirgstruppe, (General of Mountain Troops).

== Life and career ==
Rudolf Konrad was born in Kulmbach in Northern Bavaria on 7 March 1891. He entered the German Army in July 1910 as an ensign. Joining a Bavarian Field Artillery Regiment in October 1912 as a Lieutenant, he served with them in World War I.

He remained in the Reichswehr after 1918, rising to command a Gebirgsjager (Mountain) Regiment from October 1935. Becoming a staff officer, in 1940 he became chief of staff of XVIII Corps, then of 2nd Army. He was then given a field command, first of 7th Mountain Division then, for most of the period from December 1941 to May 1944, of XXXXIX Mountain Corps on the Eastern Front. He received the Knight's Cross of the Iron Cross in August 1942 for his command of this corps. Finally, he commanded LXVIII Corps from early 1945 until the end of the war.

In 1966 the Bundeswehr barracks in Bad Reichenhall was named 'General Konrad Barracks'. In August 2012 it was renamed 'Hochstaufen Barracks', Christian Schmidt the Parliamentary Secretary of State of the Federal Ministry of Defence describing the previous name as outdated.

== Awards and decorations ==
As a General of Mountain Troops and commander of XXXXIX Mountain Corps Konrad received:

- mention in the Wehrmachtbericht (Armed Forces Report) of 27 July 1942 for his role in the capture of Bataisk, near Rostov;
- the Knight's Cross of the Iron Cross on 1 August 1942;
- the German Cross in Gold on 23 February 1944.

Military offices
Preceded by Previously 99 Light Infantry Division	Commander of 7. Gebirgs-Division; 1 November 1941 – 19 December 1941	Succeeded by Generalmajor Wilhelm Weiß
Preceded by General der Gebirgstruppe Ludwig Kübler	Commander of XXXXIX. Gebirgs-Armeekorps; 19 December 1941 – 26 July 1943	Succeeded by General der Infanterie Helge Auleb
Preceded by General der Infanterie Helge Auleb	Commander of XXXXIX. Gebirgs-Armeekorps; 15 August 1943 – 15 February 1944	Succeeded by General der Infanterie Friedrich Köchling
Preceded by General der Infanterie Friedrich Köchling	Commander of XXXXIX. Gebirgs-Armeekorps; 15 March 1944 – 10 May 1944	Succeeded by General der Artillerie Walter Hartmann
Preceded by Generalleutnant Arthur Schwarzenecker	Commander of LXVIII. Armeekorps; 29 january 1945 - 8 May 1945	Succeeded by None
