= Paris Protocols =

1941 agreement between Nazi Germany and Vichy France

The Paris Protocols were an agreement between Nazi Germany and Vichy France negotiated in May 1941. Although not ratified, the protocols were implemented. Admiral François Darlan represented the French and the German ambassador to France, Otto Abetz, represented the Germans. Signed on 28 May 1941, the Paris Protocols granted the Germans military facilities in Syria, Tunisia, and French West Africa. In exchange, the French received reduced occupation costs (down to 15 million Reichsmarks a day from 20 million), return of some 6,800 French experts from prisoner-of-war camps, and ease on the restrictions between "occupied France" and "unoccupied France".

The Paris Protocols are considered the highpoint of Vichy French collaboration with the Nazis. But Darlan wanted still better terms and ultimately the protocols lapsed.

== See also ==
- Armistice of 22 June 1940
- Anglo-Iraqi War
- Syria–Lebanon Campaign
