= Werner Junck =

German general (1895–1976)

- Born: 28 December 1895; Magdeburg, Province of Saxony, Kingdom of Prussia, German Empire
- Died: 6 August 1976 (aged 80); Munich, Bavaria West Germany
- Burial place: Munich Waldfriedhof
- Military career
- Allegiance: German Empire; Weimar Republic; Nazi Germany
- Branch: Luftwaffe
- Service years: 1914–1923; 1934–1944
- Rank: Generalleutnant
- Unit: Jagdstaffel 8
- Commands: 2nd Fighter Corps
- Conflicts: World War I; World War II; Anglo-Iraqi War
- Awards: Knight's Cross of the Iron Cross
- Other work: Heinkel chief test pilot

Werner Karl Otto Junck (28 December 1895 – 6 August 1976) was a German general in the Luftwaffe during World War II, serving in Iraq and later in the Baltic campaign. He claimed five aerial victories during World War I.

== Early life ==
Werner Junck was born in Magdeburg, the Province of Saxony, the Kingdom of Prussia, the German Empire, on 28 December 1895. He was interested in aviation, and learned to fly in 1913.

== Career ==
=== World War I ===
Junck entered military service as an artillery officer as World War I began. In 1916, he was posted to Flieger-Abteilung (Flier Detachment) 33 of the Die Fliegertruppen (the flying troops).

In October 1916, as Die Fliegertruppen morphed into the Luftstreitkräfte, Junck was transferred to a fighter squadron, Jagdstaffel 8. He achieved his first aerial victory on 24 April 1917, downing a 20 Squadron FE.2d east of Ypres. He rose to command of the Jasta on 4 April 1918 and stayed with it through the war's end. Junck was wounded three times and shot down four SPADs in northern France before the Armistice. His five victories made him an ace. His three wounds qualified him for a Silver Wound Badge, though there is no record it was awarded to him.

=== Interwar period ===
Werner Junck was an instructor at the Reichswehr's secret Lipetsk fighter-pilot school in the Soviet Union from 1925 to 1928. Junck also participated in the first, third and fourth Fédération Aéronautique Internationale (FAI) Tourist Plane Contests: Challenge 1929 (27th place), Challenge 1932 (14th place), and Challenge 1934 (6th place).

Later in 1934, he joined the nascent Luftwaffe with the rank of major. By 1938 or 1939, he was an Oberstleutnant commanding Jagdgruppe 334.

=== World War II ===
Junck's best-known role in World War II was as Fliegerführer (squadron commander) of unit Sonderkommando Junck (Special Force Junck), the Luftwaffe component of the Sonderstab F mission in Iraq in early May 1941. The purpose of Special Staff F was to aid General Rashid Ali's rebel government after it overthrew the pro-British regime the previous month. On 29 May, the mission retreated from Iraq.

Later in the war, Junck led forces as Jagdfliegerführer Deutsche Bucht (Fighter Leader German Bight) in the Baltic campaign.

=== Later years ===
In 1960 he was appointed honorary chairman of the Gemeinschaft der Jagdflieger, the Association of Fighter Pilots.

== Promotions ==
- 10 August 1914 Kriegsfreiwilliger (War Volunteer)
- 2 March 1915 Gefreiter (Private E-2 / Lance Corporal)
- 21 July 1915 Fahnenjunker-Unteroffizier (Officer Candidate with Corporal/NCO/Junior Sergeant rank)
- 2 September 1915 Fähnrich (Officer Cadet)
- 30 September 1913 Leutnant (2nd Lieutenant) without Patent
  - 28 June 1917 received Patent from 12 November 1914
  - 1 July 1922 received Reichswehr Rank Seniority (RDA) from 1 September 1915 (145)
- 24 May 1923 Charakter als Oberleutnant (Honorary 1st Lieutenant) with effect from 31 May 1923
- 1 July 1934 DLV-Fliegerkapitän (Captain) with Rank Seniority (RDA) from 1 May 1930
  - German Air Sports Association ranks were awarded because the Luftwaffe was still "camouflaged".
  - 26 February with effect from 1 March 1935 rank renamed Hauptmann (Captain)
- 1 April 1935 Major (5)
- 20 April 1937 Oberstleutnant (Lieutenant Colonel) with effect from 1 April 1937 (17)
- 30 September 1939 Oberst (Colonel) with effect and RDA from 1 October 1939 (6)
- 1 April 1943 Generalmajor (Major General)
- 1 December 1944 Generalleutnant (Lieutenant General)

== Awards and decorations ==
- Iron Cross (1914), 2nd and 1st Class
  - 2nd Class on 8 April 1916
  - 1st Class on 28 August 1917
- Prussian Military Pilot Badge on 15 February 1917
- Wound Badge (1918) in Black on 3 October 1918
- Silesian Eagle Order, II. and I. Grade with Swords on 15 September 1919
- Aviator Commemorative Badge on 11 May 1920
- Honour Cross of the World War 1914/1918 with Swords on 21 December 1934
- Pilot's Badge (Wehrmacht) on 16 April 1935
- Wehrmacht Long Service Award, 4th to 3rd Class on 2 October 1936
- Repetition Clasp 1939 to the Iron Cross 1914, 2nd and 1st Class
  - 1st Class on 31 March 1941
- Imperial Order of the Yoke and Arrows, Commander on 20 March 1941
- Front Flying Clasp of the Luftwaffe for Fighters in Bronze on 31 March 1941
- Knight's Cross of the Iron Cross on 9 June 1944 as Generalmajor and Commanding General of the II. Jagdkorps

== See also ==
- Fliegerführer Irak
- Special Staff F

== Endnotes ==
Military offices
Preceded by Oberst Bruno Loerzer	Commander of Jagdgeschwader 53 Pik As; April 1938 – September 1939	Succeeded by Major Hans Klein
Preceded by Generalmajor Bruno Loerzer	Inspekteur der Jagdflieger; 1 February 1939 – 4 June 1940	Succeeded by Generalmajor Kurt-Bertram von Döring
Preceded by Oberst Gerd von Massow	Jagdfliegerführer 3; 5 June 1940 – 30 April 1941	Succeeded by Generalmajor Max Ibel
Preceded by none	Fliegerführer; 6 May 1941 – 29 May 1941	Succeeded by none
Preceded by Generalmajor Carl-Alfred Schumacher	Jagdfliegerführer Deutsche Bucht; 1 August 1941 – 31 March 1942	Succeeded by Generalmajor Hermann Frommherz
Preceded by none	Commander of 3. Jagd-Division; 1 May 1942 – 15 September 1943	Succeeded by Generalleutnant Kurt-Bertram von Döring
Preceded by Generalleutnant Joachim-Friedrich Huth	Commander of 4. Jagd-Division; 15 September 1943 – 30 September 1943	Succeeded by Oberst Carl Vieck
Preceded by none	Commander of II. Jagdkorps; 15 September 1943 – 30 June 1944	Succeeded by General Alfred Bülowius
