= Special Staff F =

Cover name for a German military mission to Iraq during World War II

Special Staff F (German: Sonderstab F) was the cover name for a German military mission to Iraq during World War II. Sonderstab F was created on 20 May 1941 and ceased to exist on 20 June 1941.

== Description ==
On 23 May, the instructions for Sonderstab F were detailed by German dictator Adolf Hitler in Führer Directive No. 30 (Weisung Nr. 30). The directive detailed German intervention in support of Arab nationalists who seized the government in Iraq and were being confronted by British forces. The mission included a Brandenburger Regiment, a German Air Force (Luftwaffe) component, and a German Foreign Office (Auswärtiges Amt) component. Many members of the various mission components had received orders prior to 23 May and were in Iraq at the time Weisung Nr. 30 was issued. The Anglo-Iraqi War started on 2 May. According to British Prime Minister Winston Churchill, the "vigorous instructions" provided by Hitler were "belated" and developed at a time when "all chance of useful Axis intervention had passed."

Sonderstab F was commanded by General Hellmuth Felmy. While Felmy was a General der Flieger, he did not command the air component of Sonderstab F. General Felmy commanded Sonderstab F from Greece and it was Major Axel von Blomberg who flew to Iraq. He was the commander of the reconnaissance group in Iraq until his untimely death. Had he lived, von Blomberg was to integrate the Luftwaffe component, Fliegerführer Irak, with Iraqi armed forces in operations against the British. In addition, he and other members of the Brandenburger Regiment were to raise a German-led Arab Brigade (Arabische Brigade). The brigade was to have been raised in Iraq from the thousands of Arab volunteers available from Iraq, from Syria, from Palestine, from Saudi Arabia, and from throughout the Arab world. After his death and after the mission was a failure, the small group of German Military Intelligence (Abwehr) officers who followed him discussed the destruction of all oil facilities in Iraq. But this was pure fantasy for the four Brandenburgers available.

Dr. Fritz Grobba represented the German Foreign Office in Iraq for Sonderstab F. As such, he was responsible for the direction of mission-related propaganda in addition to his diplomatic duties.

In accordance with "Weisung Nr. 30", the command structure for the Luftwaffe component of Sonderstab F was independent from the rest of the mission. Luftwaffe Colonel Werner Junck commanded Fliegerführer Irak in Iraq. He reported directly to Lieutenant General Hans Jeschonnek in Germany. Fliegerführer Irak arrived in Iraq on 13 May, fought against the British under conditions which became more and more difficult, and, by the end of the month, was forced to abandon Iraq.

== See also ==
- Anglo-Iraqi War
- Condor Legion
