= Hellmuth Felmy =

German general and war criminal (1885–1965)

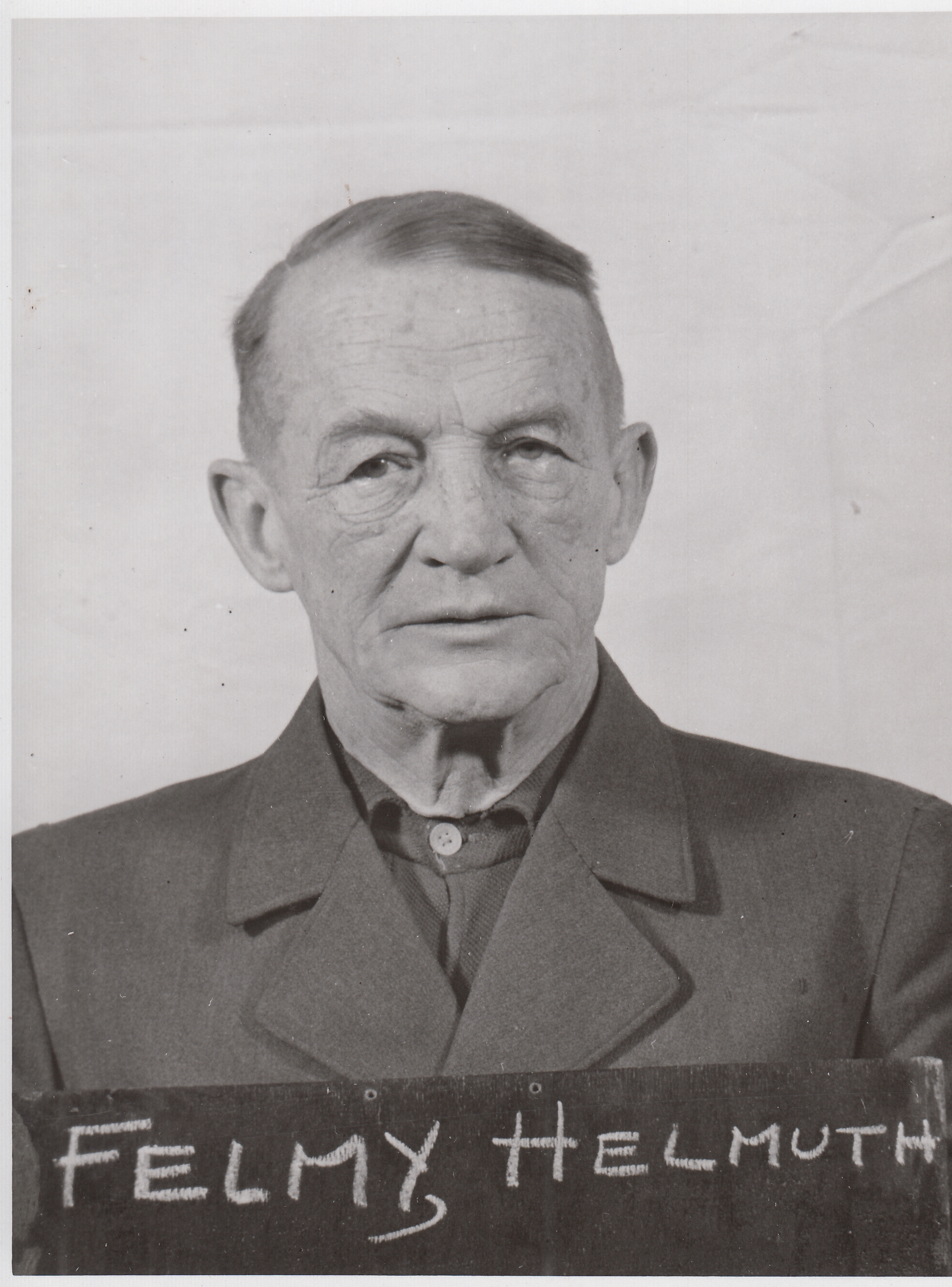
- Born: Walter Hellmuth Wolfgang Felmÿ; 28 May 1885; Berlin, German Empire
- Died: 14 December 1965 (aged 80); Darmstadt, West Germany
- Spouse: Helene Maria Elisabeth Boettcher (m. 03-Jul-1919)
- Relatives: Hansjörg Felmy (son)
- Military career
- Allegiance: German Empire; Weimar Republic; Nazi Germany
- Branch: Imperial Army Air Service; Luftwaffe
- Rank: General der Flieger
- Commands: Luftflotte 2 Army Group Southern Greece; LXVIII Army Corps; XXXIV Army Corps
- Conflicts: World War I: Turkish Front; World War II: Axis occupation of Greece; Yugoslav Partisan General Offensive
- Awards: German Cross in gold Clasp to the Iron Cross 2nd and 1st class War Merit Cross 2nd and 1st class with swords

Hellmuth Felmy (28 May 1885 – 14 December 1965) was a German general and war criminal during World War II, commanding forces in occupied Greece and Yugoslavia. A high-ranking Luftwaffe officer, Felmy was tried and convicted in the 1948 Hostages Trial.

== Biography ==
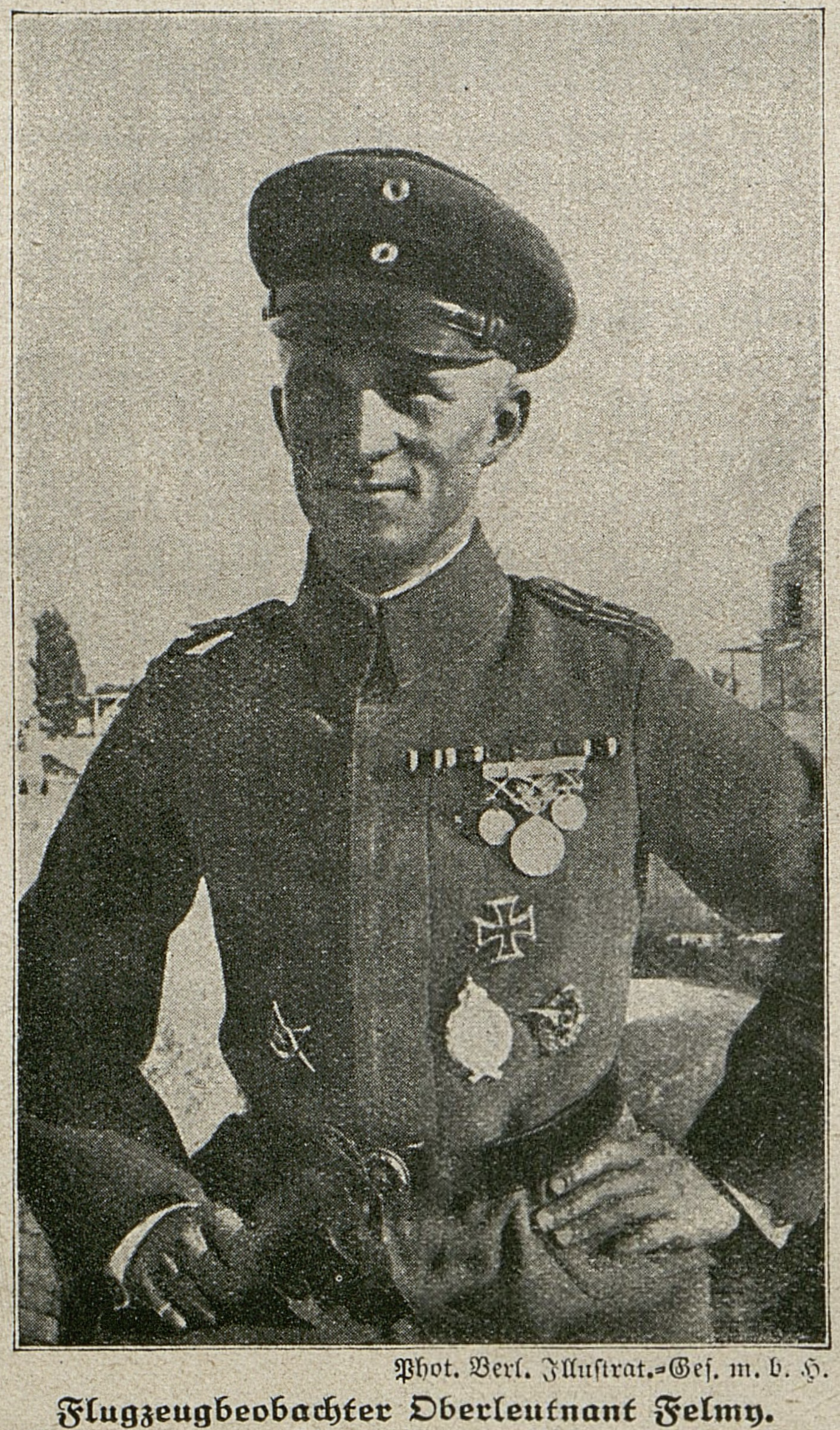
Pilot observer First Lieutenant Hellmuth Felmy (c. 1917)

Born Walter Hellmuth Wolfgang Felmÿ on 28 May 1885 in Berlin to Otto Emil Alexander and Anna Martha Maria [Fleischer] Felmÿ. In 1904, he joined the Imperial Army and, in 1912, Felmy went to flight school to become a pilot for the Imperial Army Air Service. During World War I, Felmy commanded a squadron "Flying Detachment 300", on the Turkish Front. Felmy, together with his comrade, First Lieutenant Richard Falke, cut a British long-distance water pipeline in an airborne operation. This caused the British Expeditionary Force short-term supply problems. The attempted demolition of the important railway line near El Qantara, far behind the front line, on 25 May 1917, however, failed. After the war, he remained in the German military. Felmy alternated between infantry and aviation assignments in the Reichswehr of the Weimar Republic. On 4 February 1938, Felmy was promoted to General der Flieger.

By the beginning of World War II, Felmy commanded Air Fleet 2 (Luftflotte 2) of the Luftwaffe. On 12 January, he was dismissed due to the Mechelen Incident and replaced by Albert Kesselring. The reputation of his sons, also members of the Luftwaffe, were also tarnished. In an effort to rehabilitate his family he joined the Nazi Party (against protocol).

In May 1941, Felmy was called up by the High Command of the Armed Forces (Oberkommando der Wehrmacht, or OKW) to be the commander of Special Staff F, the military mission to Iraq. While Felmy was a General der Flieger, he was not responsible for commanding the air force component of the Special Staff. Sonderstab F lasted from 20 May to 20 June, ending in failure. Felmy commanded the mission in Iraq from occupied Greece.

After the failure of the mission to Iraq, Felmy was appointed commander of Military Command Southern Greece (Befehlshaber Südgriechenland). From 1942 to 1943, he remained in Greece and commanded a "special deployment" (zur besonderen Verwendung, or z. b. V.) unit named after him (z. b. V. Felmy). From 1943 to 1944, he commanded the LXVIII Army Corps of the German Army. Late in 1944, the LXVIII Corps moved from Greece to Yugoslavia. From 1944 to 1945, he commanded the XXXIV Army Corps. In 1945, the XXXIV Corps was defeated during the Yugoslav Partisan General Offensive of March and April.

In 1948, during the Hostages Trial in Nuremberg, Felmy was convicted of war crimes in Greece and was given a sentence of 15 years. His sentence was reviewed by the "Peck Panel". He was released early, on 15 December 1951 by High Commissioner John J. McCloy. On 14 December 1965, Felmy died in Darmstadt, West Germany.

=== Posthumous ===
In 2007, Felmy's writings about Cossacks who fought for the Germans, along with those of Walter Warlimont, were published in The Cossack Corps.

Felmy's son, Hansjörg Felmy (1931–2007), was a successful actor and appeared in the films Torn Curtain and Brainwashed. He also appeared in a television series called Tatort.

== Awards and decorations ==
- Order of the Crown 4th class
- Knight's Cross of the House Order of Hohenzollern with swords
- Iron Cross (1914) 2nd and 1st class
- Hanseatic Cross of Hamburg
- Prussian Military Pilot Badge
- Military Merit Cross of Austria-Hungary, 3rd class with war decoration
- Imtiaz Medal in silver with swords
- Liakat Medal in silver with swords
- Gallipoli Star
- Honour Cross of the World War 1914/1918
- German Cross in gold
- Clasp to the Iron Cross 2nd and 1st class
- War Merit Cross 2nd and 1st class with swords

== See also ==
- Anglo-Iraqi War
- Axis occupation of Greece
- Massacre of Kalavryta
- Balkans Campaign
- Subsequent Nuremberg Trials
- XV SS Cossack Cavalry Corps

== Notes ==
Military offices
Preceded by None	Commander of Luftflotte 2; 1 February 1939 – 12 January 1940	Succeeded by Generalfeldmarschall Albert Kesselring
Preceded by None	Commander of LXVIII. Armeekorps; 23 September 1942 – 1 December 1944	Succeeded by General der Infanterie Friedrich-Wilhelm Müller
Preceded by General der Infanterie Friedrich-Wilhelm Müller	Commander of XXXIV. Armeekorps; 8 December 1944 – 8 May 1945	Succeeded by None
