= Collaboration with the Empire of Japan =

Stance in occupied countries in World War II

Before and during World War II, the Empire of Japan created a number of puppet states that played a noticeable role in the war by collaborating with Imperial Japan. With promises of "Asia for the Asiatics" cooperating in a Greater East Asia Co-Prosperity Sphere, Japan also sponsored or collaborated with parts of nationalist movements in several Asian countries colonised by European empires, the Soviet Union, and the United States. The Japanese recruited volunteers from several occupied regions and also from among Allied prisoners-of-war.

Some of the leaders in various Asian and Pacific territories cooperated with Japan as they wanted to gain independence from the European colonial overlords, as seen in Burma and Indonesia. Some other collaborators were already in power of various independent or semi-independent entities, such as Plaek Phibunsongkhram's regime in Thailand, which desired to become a major player in Asian politics but were restrained by geopolitics, and the Japanese maximised it to some extent. Others believed Japan would prevail, and either wanted to be on the winning side, or feared being on the losing one.

Like their German and Italian counterparts, the Japanese recruited many volunteers, sometimes at gunpoint, more often with promises that they later broke, or from among prisoners-of-war trying to escape appalling and frequently lethal conditions in their detention camps. Other volunteers willingly enlisted because they shared fascist or pan-Asianist ideologies.

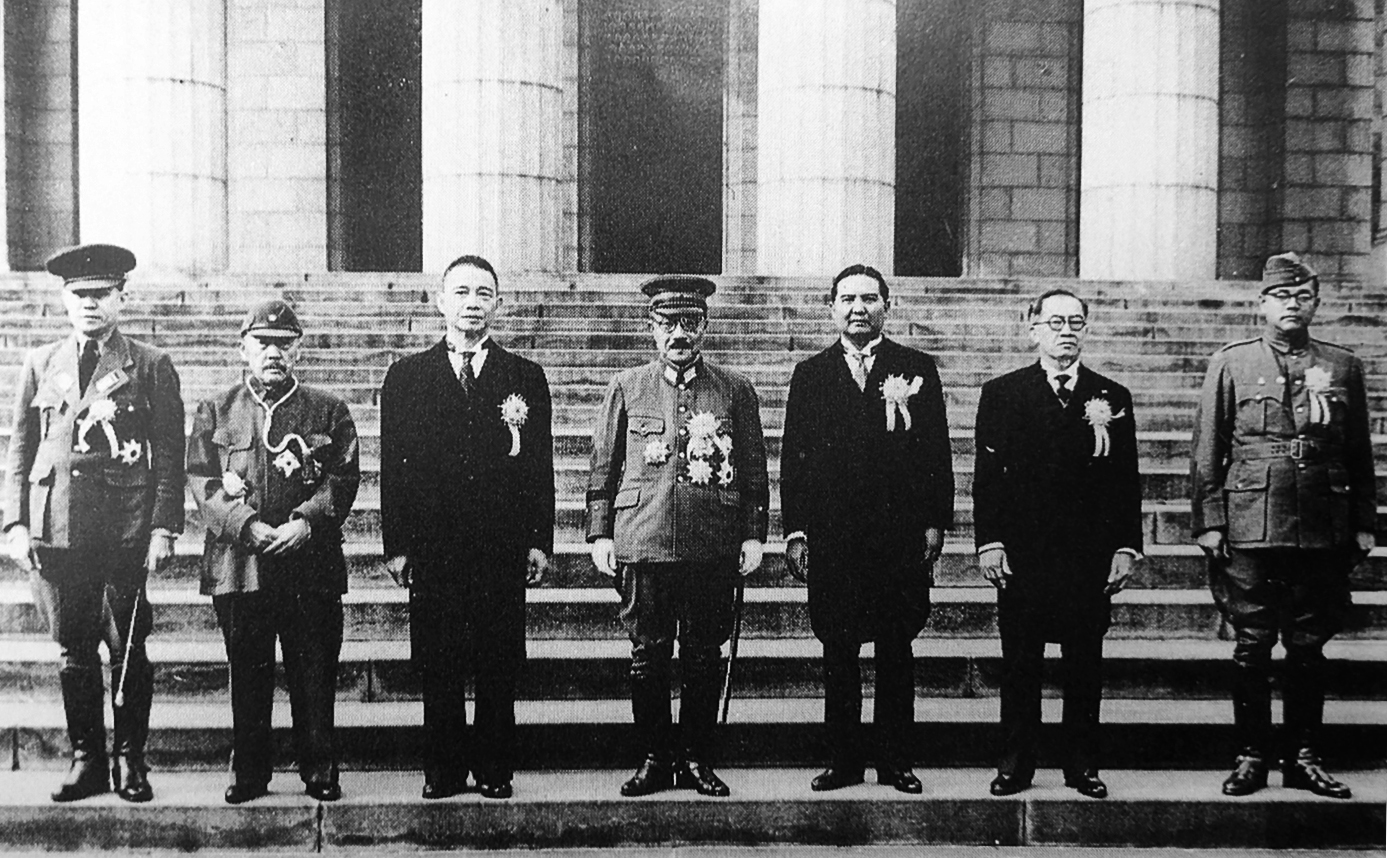
Japanese prime minister Hideki Tojo (center) with fellow government representatives of the Greater East Asia Co-Prosperity Sphere. To the left of Tojo, from left to right: Ba Maw from Burma, Zhang Jinghui from Manchukuo and Wang Jingwei from China. To the right of Tojo, from left to right, Wan Waithayakon from Thailand, José P. Laurel from the Philippines, and Subhas Chandra Bose from India.

== Japanese colonial empire ==
=== Korea ===
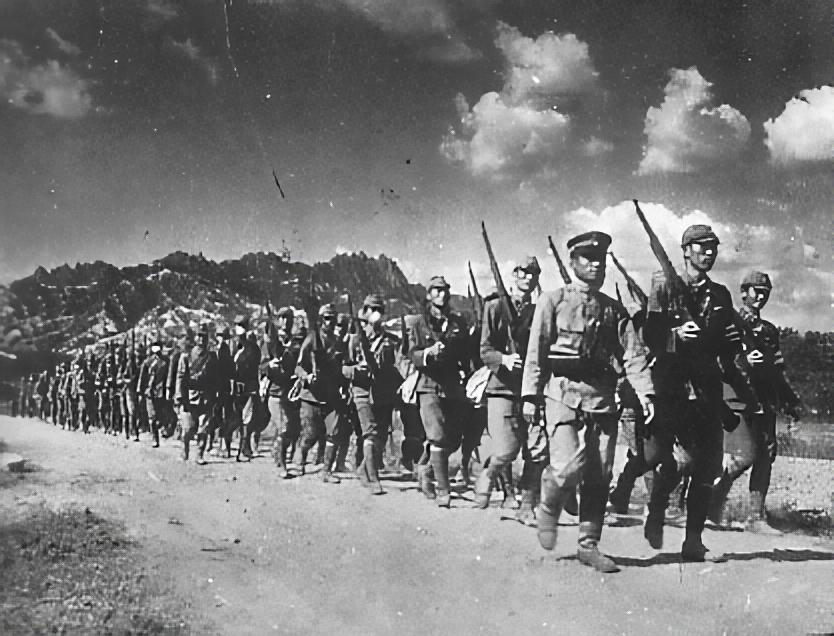
Korean volunteers of the Imperial Japanese Army, January 1943

From the late 19th century and until 1945, a number of ethnic Koreans worked with the Empire of Japan. Some of these figures contributed to or benefitted from Japan's colonization of Korea, and some actively worked to counter the Korean independence movement. These people are now considered by much of Korea to have been collaborators with Japan, and thus traitors to Korea.

Examples of such people include members of the Iljinhoe or Five Eulsa Traitors.

Prosecution of collaborators began after the liberation of Korea, although the prosecution was interfered with by the South Korean leader Syngman Rhee. Prosecution in South Korea was revived after the gradual democratization during the 1980s and 1990s. The first anti-collaborator legislation was passed in South Korea in 2005: the Special Law to Redeem Pro-Japanese Collaborators' Property.

Chinilpa (Korean: 친일파; Hanja: 親日派; lit. 'pro-Japan faction') and builbae (Korean: 부일배; Hanja: 附日輩; lit. 'that ilk who collaborated with Japan') are words used to describe collaborators. These terms can be considered derogatory.

== British Empire and Commonwealth ==
=== Burma ===
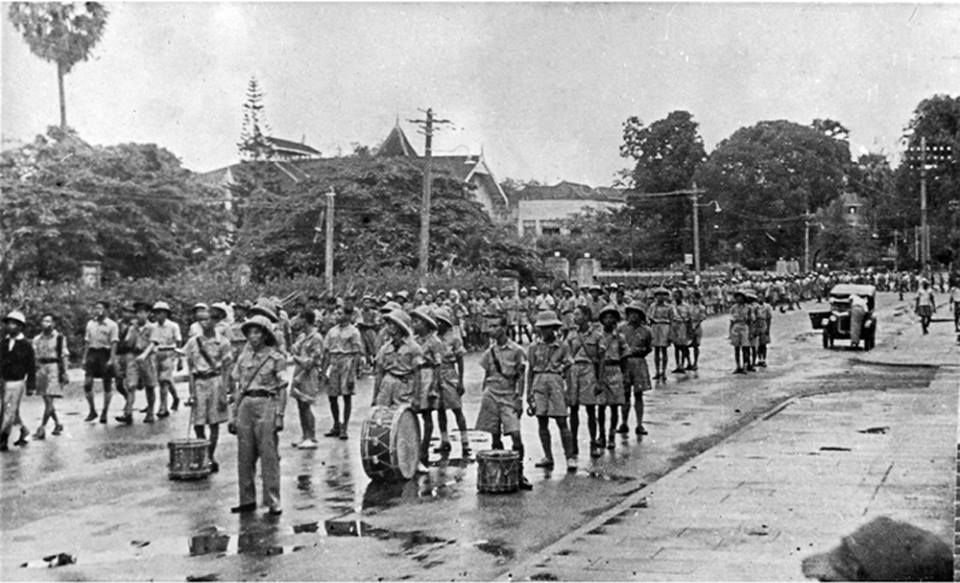
The Burma Independence Army enters Rangoon during the Japanese invasion of Burma, early 1942.

The Japanese invaded Burma because the British had been supplying China in the Second Sino-Japanese War along the Burma Road. Burmese nationalists known as Burma Independence Army hoped for independence. They were later transformed into the Burma National Army as the armed forces of the State of Burma. Minority groups were also armed by the Japanese, such as the Arakan Defense Army and the Chin Defense Army.

=== Hong Kong ===
Hong Kong was a British crown colony before its occupation by the Japanese. During the Japanese rule, former members of the Hong Kong Police Force, including Indians and Chinese, were recruited into the Kempeitai police force.

=== India ===
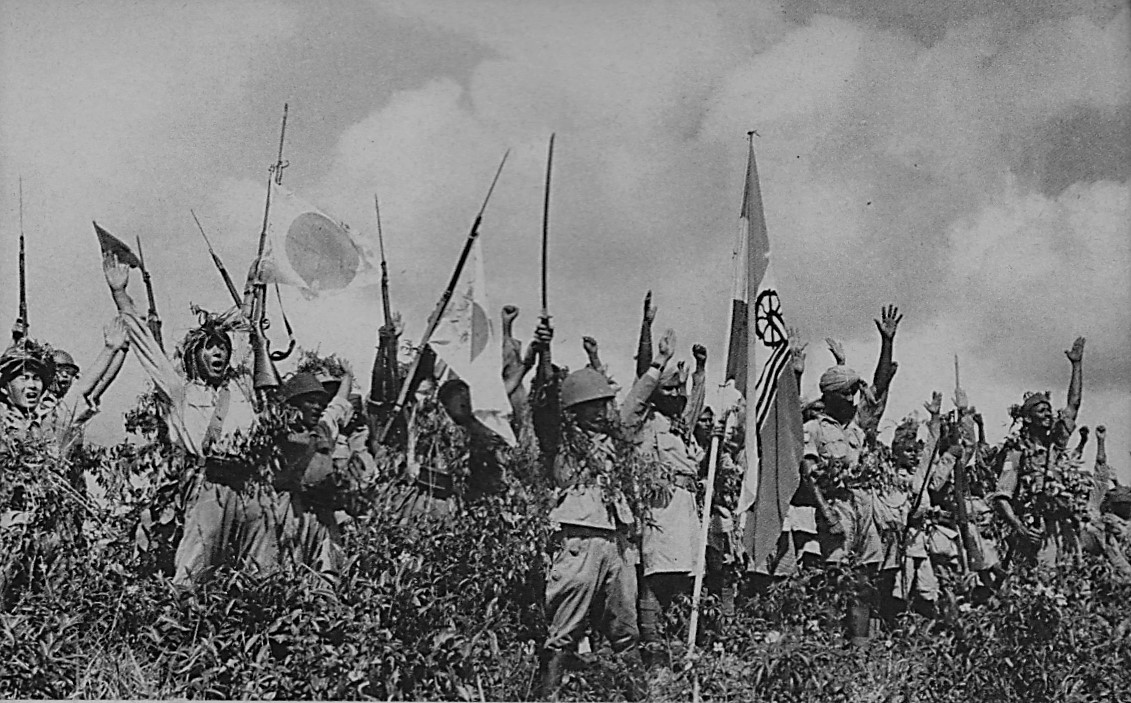
Troops of the Imperial Japanese Army and the Indian National Army on the Burma–India border, March 1943

The Indian Legion (Legion Freies Indien, Indische Freiwilligen Infanterie Regiment 950 or Indische Freiwilligen-Legion der Waffen-SS) was created in August 1942, recruiting chiefly from disaffected British Indian Army prisoners of war captured by Axis forces in the North African campaign. Most were supporters of the exiled nationalist and former president of the Indian National Congress Subhas Chandra Bose. The Royal Italian Army formed a similar unit of Indian prisoners of war, the Battaglione Azad Hindoustan. A Japanese-supported puppet state known as the Azad Hind was also established with the Indian National Army as its military force.

=== Iraq ===
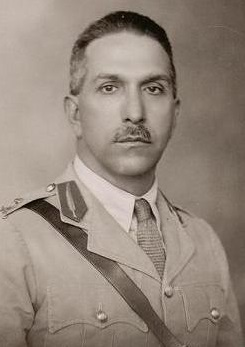
Pro-Japanese Iraqi Prime Minister Taha al-Hashimi, who served in Iraq's short-lived pro-Axis government in 1941

One of Iraq's most prominent politicians, Taha al-Hashimi, was pro-Japanese and stressed that the Arab world should look to Japan as a role model. In 1941, elements of the Iraqi military led by four Colonels, Salah al-Din al-Sabbagh, Kamil Shabib, Fahmi Said, and Mahmud Salman, toppled the Hashemite monarchy and installed a pro-Axis government with Taha al-Hashimi serving as the Prime Minister. Japan, one of the three main Axis powers, supported the group as part of its strategy to improve relations with the Islamic world, although geographical distance meant its support was merely symbolic.

=== Malaya ===
After occupying British Malaya, Japanese occupation authorities reorganized the disbanded British colonial police force and created a new auxiliary police. Later on, a 2,000-men strong Malayan Volunteer Army and a part-time Malayan Volunteer Corps were created. Local residents were also encouraged to join the Imperial Japanese Army as auxiliary Heiho. There was a Railway Protection Corps as well.

==== Straits Settlements ====
The British territory of the Straits Settlements (Singapore, Malacca, Penang and Dindings) came under Japanese occupation after the fiasco suffered by Commonwealth forces at the Fall of Singapore. The Straits Settlements Police Force came under the control of the Japanese and all vessels owned by the Marine Police were confiscated.

== China ==
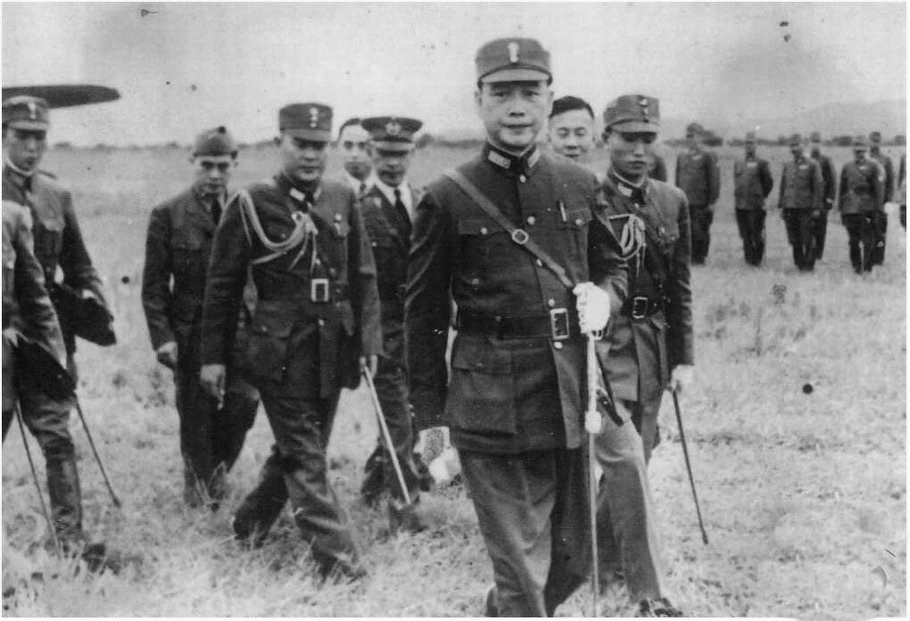
Wang Jingwei with officers of the Collaborationist Chinese Army in the early years of the Second Sino-Japanese War, late 1930s

The Japanese had previously set up several puppet regimes in occupied Chinese territories. The first was Manchukuo in 1932, under former Chinese emperor Puyi, then the East Hebei Autonomous Government in 1935. Similar to Manchukuo in its supposed ethnic identity, Mengjiang (Mengkukuo) was set up in late 1936. Wang Kemin's collaborationist Provisional Government was set up in Beijing in 1937 following the start of full-scale military operations between China and Japan, and another puppet regime, the Reformed Government of the Republic of China, in Nanjing in 1938.

The Wang Jingwei collaborationist government, established in 1940, "consolidated" these regimes, though in reality neither Wang's government nor the constituent governments had any autonomy, although the military of the Wang Jingwei regime was equipped by the Japanese with planes, cannons, tanks, boats, and German-style stahlhelm, which were already widely used by the National Revolutionary Army, the "official" army of the Republic of China.

The military forces of these puppet regimes, known collectively as the Collaborationist Chinese Army, numbered more than a million at their height, with some estimates that the number exceeded 2 million conscriptees. Many collaborationist troops originally served warlords of the National Revolutionary Army who had defected when facing both Communists and Japanese. Although the collaborationist army was very large, its soldiers were very ineffective compared to NRA soldiers, and had low morale because they were considered "Hanjian". Some collaborationist forces saw battlefields during the Second Sino-Japanese War, but most were relegated to behind-the-line duties.

The Wang Jingwei government was disbanded after the Japanese surrendered to Allies in 1945, and Manchukuo and Mengjiang were destroyed in the Soviet invasion of Manchuria.

=== Xinjiang (Chinese Turkestan) ===
Japan attempted to create an Islamic state spanning from Xinjiang to Soviet Central Asia during the Kumul Rebellion of 1931-1934. During World War II, Japanese agents were again active in both Xinjiang and Soviet Central Asia, where the Japanese attempted to foster rebellions among Muslim population against both China and the Soviet Union.

== Dutch East Indies (Indonesia) ==
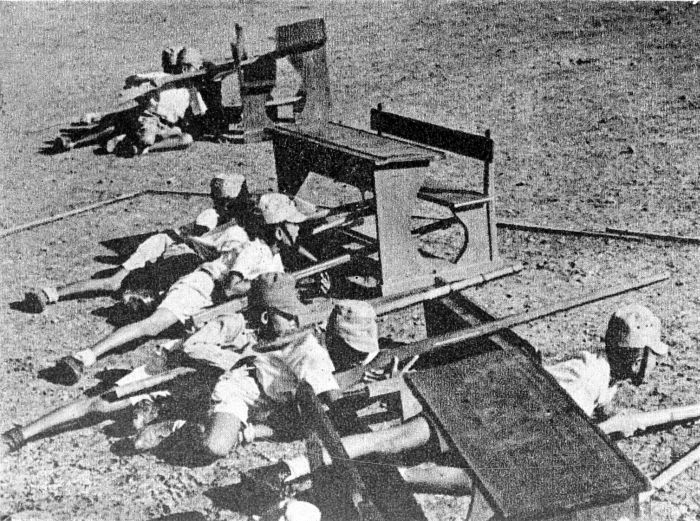
Young PETA fighters participating in Japanese military training, c. 1945

Following its swift victory in the Dutch East Indies campaign of 1941–1942, Imperial Japan was welcomed as a liberator by much of the native population of the Dutch East Indies (present-day Indonesia), and especially by the Indonesian nationalists who since the early 20th century had begun developing a national consciousness. In the wake of the Japanese advance, rebellious Indonesians across the archipelago killed scores of European and pro-Dutch civilians (in particular from the Chinese community) and informed the invaders on the whereabouts of others, 100,000 of whom would be imprisoned in Japanese-run internment camps alongside 80,000 American, British, Dutch, and Australian prisoners of war. Unlike in occupied French Indochina, where Imperial Japan worked alongside the French colonizer, the Japanese supplanted the Dutch administration of the East Indies and elevated native elites willing to work with them to power, fueling Indonesian hopes of future self-rule. Imperial Japan imposed a strict occupation regime on the archipelago, however, as to them the value of the archipelago lay mostly in its ample resources for the war effort (specifically oil, tin, and bauxite) and their initial use for the nationalists only extended to the pacification and organization of the sizeable population of Java.

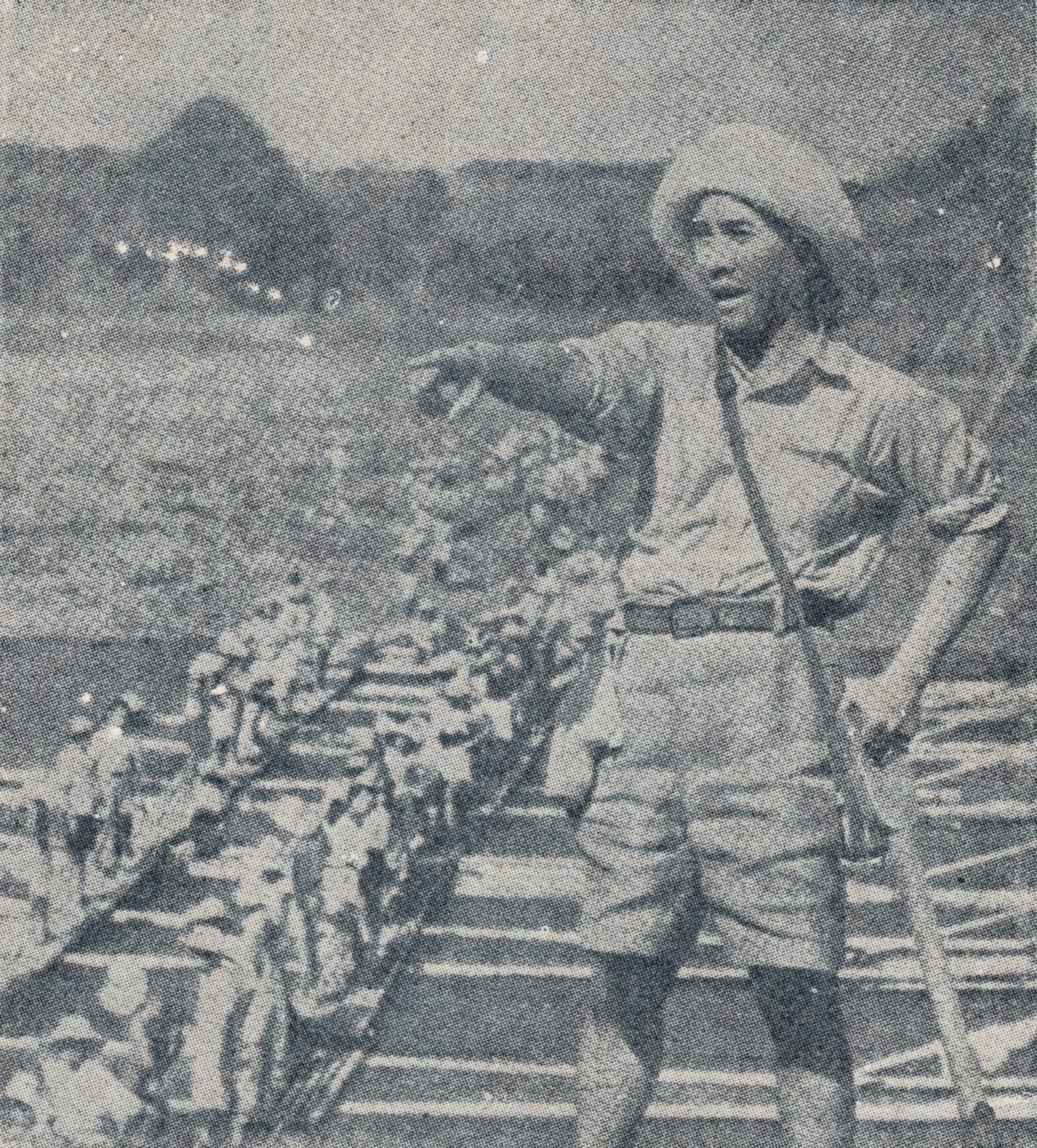
Sukarno directing rōmusha (forced labor) activities, c. 1944

During the occupation of the Dutch East Indies, Sukarno and Mohammad Hatta, respectively the inaugural president and vice president of the future Republic of Indonesia, became promoters of the Japanese rōmusha forced labor scheme through the Center of the People's Power (Pusat Tenaga Rakyat; Putera) and mobilized workers for Japanese production and construction projects across Southeast Asia, such as the strategic railways on Sumatra and West Java, and along the Burma–Thailand border. In total, 4 to 10 million Indonesian laborers were recruited and some 270,000 to 500,000 Javanese were sent abroad, of whom 70,000 to 135,000 returned after the war. In November 1943, the Japanese flew Sukarno and Hatta to Tokyo to receive the Order of the Rising Sun from Emperor Hirohito for their services. Similarly, Indonesia's second president Suharto and first commander of the Indonesian National Armed Forces Sudirman began their military careers in the Japanese-sponsored Defenders of the Homeland (Pembela Tanah Air; PETA), which alongside the auxiliaries of the Heiho (兵補) was to assist the Imperial Japanese military in fighting off the expected Allied return to the East Indies. Hundreds of thousands served in Japanese organizations such as the propaganda institution Keimin Bunka Shidōsho (啓民文化指導所), the youth movement Seinendan (青年団), and the auxiliary police forces of the Keibōdan (警防団).

As its fortunes turned, Imperial Japan became faced with growing resistance to its increasingly repressive occupation and began catering to the Indonesian desire for self-rule. Already in September 1943, the Javanese Central Advisory Council (Chūō Sangiin, 中央参議院) had been created around Sukarno, Hatta, Ki Hajar Dewantara, and Mas Mansur, and expanded to include notables such as Rajiman Wediodiningrat and Ki Bagus Hadikusumo. Sumatran representation under Mohammad Syafei, Abdul Abas, and Teuku Nyak Arif would follow nearly two years later and included established nationalists such as Djamaluddin Adinegoro and Adnan Kapau Gani. In January 1944, the Center of the People's Power was replaced by the less overtly Japanese-controlled Hōkōkai (奉公会; Himpunan Kebaktian Rakjat) in a renewed attempt to increase Javanese labor and produce for the Japanese war effort. A paramilitary youth wing, the Suishintai (推進体; Barisan Pelopor), would be founded in August. In July 1944, Japanese prime minister Hideki Tojo was forced to resign and on 7 September his replacement Kuniaki Koiso made a promise of independence for "the East Indies" di kemudian hari (English: at a later date). In spite of the deteriorating military situation and a disastrous famine on Java, war enthusiasm had returned to the extent that the suicide attack corps Jibakutai (自爆隊; Barisan Berani Mati) could be formed on 8 December 1944.

On 14 February 1945, a PETA battalion under Supriyadi launched a short-lived revolt against the Japanese in Blitar, East Java. Although it was quickly put down and possibly misattributed to nationalist fervor, it factored into the Japanese realization that their window on creating an Indonesian puppet state had closed. Hoping to extend the occupation by redirecting nationalist energy towards harmless political squabbles, the military authority on Java announced the formation of the Investigating Committee for Preparatory Work for Independence (Badan Penyelidik Usaha-usaha Persiapan Kemerdekaan; BPUPK) on 1 March 1945. Despite meeting only twice, the plenary sessions of the BPUPK would see the formulation of Pancasila and the Jakarta Charter that would later form the basis of the preamble to the Constitution of Indonesia. On 7 August, the day after the atomic bombing of Hiroshima, Japanese field marshal Hisaichi Terauchi approved the establishment of the Preparatory Committee for Indonesian Independence (Panitia Persiapan Kemerdekaan Indonesia; PPKI) and promised Indonesian independence would be granted on 24 August 1945. As Imperial Japan surrendered to the Allies on 15 August, Sukarno instead proclaimed Indonesian independence on 17 August 1945. In the Indonesian National Revolution that followed, 903 Japanese nationals volunteered for the Indonesian cause, of whom 531 wound up dead or missing.

== French Indochina (Cambodia, Laos, Vietnam) ==
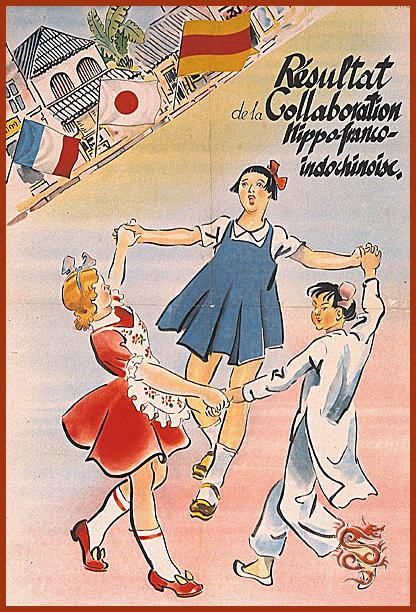
Japanese propaganda poster exalting Vichy French and Vietnamese collaboration in Indochina, c. 1942

Japanese soldiers primarily used Laos to stage attacks on Nationalist China.

On 22 September 1940, Vichy France and the Empire of Japan signed an agreement allowing the Japanese to station no more than 6,000 troops in French Indochina, with no more than 25,000 troops transiting the colony. Rights were given for three airfields, with all other Japanese forces forbidden to enter Indochina without Vichy's consent, although in truth it was rarely enforced as Japanese troops were able to enter all of Indochina unchecked. Vichy signed the Joint Defense and Joint Military Cooperation treaty with Japan on 29 July 1941. It granted the Japanese eight airfields, allowed them to have more troops present, and to use the Indochinese financial system, in return for a fragile French autonomy.

The French colonial government had largely stayed in place, as the Vichy government was on reasonably friendly terms with Japan. The Japanese permitted the French to put down nationalist rebellions in 1940.

The Japanese occupation forces kept French Indochina under nominal rule of Vichy France until March 1945, when the French colonial administration was overthrown, and the Japanese supported the establishment of the Empire of Vietnam, the Kingdom of Kampuchea and the Kingdom of Luang Prabang as Japanese puppet states. Vietnamese militia were used to assist the Japanese. In Cambodia, the ex-colonial Cambodian constabulary was allowed to continue its existence, though it was reduced to ineffectuality. A plan to create a Cambodian volunteer force was not realized due to the Japanese surrender. In Laos, the local administration and ex-colonial Garde Indigène (Indigenous Guard, a paramilitary police force) were re-formed by Prince Phetsarath, who replaced its Vietnamese members with Laotians. The Hmong Lo clan supported the Japanese.

== Philippines ==
The Second Philippine Republic (1943–1945) was a puppet state established by Japanese forces after their 1942 invasion of the United States' Commonwealth of the Philippines (1935–1946). The Second Republic relied on the re-formed Bureau of Constabulary and the Makapili militia to police the occupied country and fight the local resistance movement and the Philippine Commonwealth Army. The president of the republic, Jose P. Laurel, had a presidential guard unit recruited from the ranks of the collaborationist government. When the Americans closed in on the Philippines in 1944, the Japanese began to recruit Filipinos, who mostly served in the Imperial Japanese Army and actively fought until Japan's surrender. Members of the religious group Iglesia ni Cristo (then known as Iglesia ni Kristo or INK) were used by the Japanese as civilian guards. After the war, members of Makapili and other civilian collaborators were subject to harsh treatment by both the government and civilians, because their actions had led to the capture, torture, and execution of many Filipinos.

== Portuguese Empire ==
=== East Timor ===
The Second Portuguese Republic under António de Oliveira Salazar was neutral during World War II, but its colony on Timor (present-day East Timor) was occupied by the Japanese to expel Australian, New Zealander and Dutch troops. The Japanese used the population for forced labor. The Portuguese administration was allowed to retain autonomy under strict Japanese supervision, while local militiamen were organized into "Black Columns" to help Japanese forces fight Allies.

=== Macau ===
Portuguese Macau became a virtual protectorate of Imperial Japan as its governor Gabriel Maurício Teixeira and local elite Pedro José Lobo attempted to maintain a balance between the demands of the Japanese consul Yasumitsu Fukui and the needs of the Macanese population, which had doubled in number due to the influx of refugees from Mainland China and Hong Kong.

== Russia and the Soviet Union ==
=== Asano Brigade ===
A pro-Japanese brigade, the Asano Brigade, was formed by White Russian emigrés living in Manchuria in the 1930s. They served with the Manchukuo Imperial Army during the Battle of Khalkhin Gol and the Soviet invasion of Manchuria, thereafter being captured in large numbers by the Red Army.

=== Central Asia ===
Japanese agents were active in Central Asia during the Russo-Japanese War, which Russian reports warned about Japanese espionage among the Turkic Muslim population.

During the Kumul Rebellion in 1932, the Japanese secretly set up a plan to create an Islamic state with the Ottoman Prince Şehzade Mehmed Abdülkerim to be the head of the new Islamic Caliphate that spanned from Soviet Central Asia to Chinese Turkestan, with support from pro-Japanese collaborationists drawn from the Kazakh, Uzbek, Uyghur and Kyrgyz population, aiming to undermine the Soviet influence. Following the Second Sino-Japanese War and distrust between the Soviet Union and Japan amidst World War II, the Japanese again aimed to include collaborationists from Muslim territory in Russian and Chinese Turkestan to ignite rebellions to undermine China and the USSR's war efforts.

=== Russian Far East ===
Soviet intelligence revealed that over 200 Japanese agents and an unknown number of collaborators were operating in the region with varied roles.

== Thailand ==
The Kra Isthmus railway was a rail line constructed for Imperial Japan during World War II linking Chumphon to Kra Buri in Thailand. The railroad connected the Bangkok-Singapore Line westward to the west coast of the Kra Isthmus near Victoria Point (Kawthaung). Sir Andrew Gilchrist wrote a harrowing account of worker conditions. Malay and Tamil slave laborers were used and material moved from Kelantan. Allied bombing in 1945 ended the 11-month operation of the railroad and the Japanese switched their focus to the Thai-Burma Railway, also referred to as the Death Railway, for the large numbers of prisoners and effectively enslaved workers who died there. They moved equipment, track and personnel from the Kra Isthmus Railway to the Thai-Burma line.

The 90 km (56 mi) line connected with the Southern Line at Chumphon. Work began on the line in June 1943 and was completed in November. Equipment and personnel from Kelantan were used. The line was in operation for 11 months until U.S. bombing ceased operation. The line was then abandoned and scrapped for use on the Thai-Burma Railway. The line connected to Ban Khao Fa Chi on the La-Un River where boats could continue transport to Ranong and on to Victoria Point (Kawthaung).

== Foreign volunteers and supporters ==
- Soviet Union and White Russian émigrés
  - Russian Fascist Party
  - Vladimir Kislitsin
  - Grigory Mikhaylovich Semyonov
  - Ivan Mikhailov
  - Anastasy Vonsiatsky
  - Genrikh Lyushkov
  - Konstantin Rodzaevsky
  - Lev Okhotin
- United Kingdom and the British Empire
  - Sir Edmund Backhouse, 2nd Baronet
  - Ignaz Trebitsch-Lincoln
  - Frederick Rutland
  - William Forbes-Sempill, 19th Lord Sempill
  - Charles Cousens
  - Patrick Stanley Vaughan Heenan
  - Kanao Inouye
- United States
  - Japanese Committee on Trade and Information
  - John Semer Farnsworth
  - Velvalee Dickinson
  - Ralph Townsend
  - Harry Thompson
  - John David Provoo
  - Tomoya Kawakita

== See also ==
- Collaboration in wartime
- Collaboration with Nazi Germany and Fascist Italy
- Greater East Asia Co-Prosperity Sphere
- List of East Asian leaders in the Japanese sphere of influence (1931–1945)
- List of Allied traitors during World War II
- Resistance during World War II
- Gakutotai – Imperial Japanese Army regiments raised from high school students in Japanese occupied territories
- Heiho – auxiliary forces composed of pro-Japanese volunteers in the occupied Dutch East Indies, British Malaya, and elsewhere
- Collaboration: Japanese Agents and Local Elites in Wartime China
- Tokyo Rose – a collective name for female English-speaking Japanese radio propagandists, some former expatriates
- Ukrainian Far Eastern Sich
