= 1941 Iraqi coup d'état =

Anti-British coup that brought Rashid Ali al-Gaylani to power

- Part of the Mediterranean and Middle East theatre of World War II
Date	1 April–2 May 1941
Location	Kingdom of Iraq
Result	Golden Square victory: Overthrow of government of 'Abd al-Ilah; Formation of National Defence Government; British intervention in Iraq

Belligerents
Iraq	Golden Square

Commanders and leaders
'Abd al-Ilah; Regent of Iraq; Taha al-Hashimi; Prime Minister of Iraq	(Iraq) Rashid Ali al-Gaylani (Iraq) Salah al-Din al-Sabbagh; 3rd Division Commander (Iraq) Kamil Shabib; 1st Division Commander (Iraq) Fahmi Said; Independent Mechanized Brigade Commander (Iraq) Mahmud Salman; Chief of the Air Force

Units involved
Royal Guard	3rd Infantry Division; 1st Infantry Division; Independent Mechanized Brigade

The 1941 Iraqi coup d'état (Arabic: ثورة رشيد علي الكيلاني, Thawrah Rašīd ʿAlī al-Kaylānī), also called the Rashid Ali Al-Gaylani coup or the Golden Square coup, was a nationalist coup d'état in Iraq on 1 April 1941 that overthrew the pro-British regime of Regent 'Abd al-Ilah and his Prime Minister Nuri al-Said and installed Sharaf bin Rajeh as Regent and Rashid Ali al-Gaylani as Prime Minister.

The coup was led by four Iraqi nationalist army generals, known as "the Golden Square", who intended to use the war to press for full Iraqi independence following the limited independence granted in 1932. To that end, they worked with German intelligence and accepted military assistance from Nazi Germany and Fascist Italy. The change in government led to the British invasion of Iraq and subsequent occupation until 1947.

== Background and coup ==
From 1939 to 1940, a pro-British regime headed by the Regent 'Abd al-Ilah and Prime Minister Nuri as-Said ruled Iraq. Iraq severed relations with Nazi Germany on 5 September 1939 following the outbreak of World War II in Europe. However, Nuri tread carefully between his close relationship with Britain and dependence on pro-German Iraqi army officers and cabinet members. By this time, Iraq had become a refuge for Palestinian Arab leaders who had fled Mandatory Palestine as a result of the failed 1936–39 Arab revolt in Palestine. Among the key figures to arrive was the Grand Mufti of Jerusalem, Haj Amin al-Husseini, the Palestinian Arab nationalist leader of the failed revolt.

On 31 March, Abd al-Ilah had learned of a plot to arrest him and fled Baghdad for RAF Habbaniya. From Habbaniya he was flown to Basra and given refuge on the gunboat HMS Cockchafer.

The Golden Square coup was launched on 1 April 1941, overthrowing the Regent and installing Rashid Ali al-Gaylani as Prime Minister. Gaylani proclaimed himself "Chief of the National Defence Government" and called forward Sharaf bin Rajeh, a distant royal relative, to legitimize the government and coup by becoming Regent in place of Abd al-Ilah. Abd al-Ilah was then indicted in absentia for 'trying to undermine the army, for harming national unity and for flouting the constitution.' Faisal and his family took refuge in the home of Mulla Effendi. The Golden Square also arrested pro-British citizens and politicians, but many managed to escape through Transjordan. This new government was recognized by the Germans, but not the British.

The Golden Square intended to refuse further concessions to Britain, retain diplomatic links with Fascist Italy, and exile prominent pro-British politicians. They thought Britain was weak and would negotiate with them. On 17 April, Ali asked Germany for military assistance in the event of war with Britain. Ali also tried to restrict British rights under Article 5 of the 1930 treaty when he insisted that any newly arrived British troops be quickly transported through Iraq and to Palestine.

== British response ==
As one of his first acts, Gaylani sent an Iraqi artillery force to attack the RAF base in Habbaniya. By the end of April, Iraqi troops held strong positions on the escarpment above the base, and a siege began.

Iraq had been a major supplier of petroleum to the Allied war effort and represented an important landbridge between British forces in Egypt and India. To secure Iraq, British Prime Minister Winston Churchill ordered General Archibald Wavell to protect the air base at Habbaniya. On 18 April, British forces from India landed in Basra, Sabine Force. In the Mandatory Palestine, another force was created to enter Iraq from the west and relieve RAF Habbaniya, Habbaniya Force.

On 18 April, in response to the coup the 20th Indian Infantry Brigade was landed at Basra. The British could initially draw upon the RAF Iraq Levies especially in RAF Habbaniya, with elements of Iraqforce. The British government justified their invasion of Iraq under the terms of the 1930 Anglo-Iraqi Treaty.

=== Siege of Habbaniya ===
In the following days, the new Iraqi government moved substantial ground forces, including an infantry brigade, an artillery brigade, and 12 armoured cars as well as tanks to the plateau overlooking RAF Habbaniya, the large Royal Air Force (RAF) base beside the River Euphrates 50 miles (80 km) west of Baghdad. Upon arrival, the Iraqis demanded that the British not move any troops nor aircraft in or out of the base. The British responded by first demanding that the Iraqis leave the area and then, following the expiry of an ultimatum given in the early hours of 2 May, launched an attack. The base had a force of 96 lightly armed aircraft, most of which were either purpose-built trainers or obsolete combat aircraft converted to training use. They also had an understrength battalion from the King's Own Royal Regiment (Lancaster), six companies of the Iraq Levies, 18 armoured cars and a company of RAF personnel, giving a total strength of 2,200 servicemen to defend the base. The Royal Iraqi Air Force, despite having aircraft that included numerous modern British-, Italian- and US-built machines, failed to achieve air superiority. By the second day of fighting (3 May), four Blenheim fighter bombers arrived.

With British forces having air superiority, the Iraqi army was forced back to Fallujah and the RAF attacked the Iraqi Air Force bases at Mosul and Rashid. Habbaniya had essentially lifted the siege with its own resources. Reinforcements, officially called "Iraqforce", came from two directions. British and Arab Legion forces arrived in two columns (Habforce and Kingcol) across the desert from Palestine and Transjordan. Additional Indian forces continued to arrive in Basra. The Iraqi army was driven out of Fallujah and pursued to Baghdad, which fell within a week. This cleared the way for the nominal restoration of the Regent and the pro-British government. British military occupation of Iraq continued until late 1947.

== German and Italian support for the nationalists ==
In the course of the Iraq war, minor reinforcements for the nationalists were received from first Germany and then Italy. Arriving aircraft were crudely painted with Iraqi colours. Small numbers of Luftwaffe (German air force) bombers and heavy fighters, followed a few days later by obsolescent Regia Aeronautica (Italian air force) biplane fighters, flew sorties from Mosul against both RAF Habbaniya and the relieving Empire forces moving across from Transjordan. This was done to little effect.

The Vichy French authorities in the Syria and Lebanon had helped the pro-Axis Iraqi nationalists and the German and Italian air forces, providing airfields for staging and refuelling. Even before the end of the Iraq campaign, this led to RAF attacks on airbases in Syria. Within weeks these events led to British and Empire forces invading Vichy-administered Syria and Lebanon in the Syria–Lebanon Campaign.

== See also ==
- 14 July Revolution
- Airspeed Oxford
- Fairey Gordon
- Farhud
- Fawzi al-Qawuqji
- Führer Directive No. 30
- Gloster Gladiator
- Hawker Audax
- King's Own Royal Regiment (Lancaster)
- Vickers Type 264 Valentia
- Vickers Wellington

== Sources ==
- de Chair, Somerset (1944). The Golden Carpet. London: Faber and Faber.
- Dunford Wood, James (2026). The Big Little War (Expanded ed.). London: The Authors' Collective. ISBN 978-1739266806.
- Dudgeon, A. G. (2000). Hidden Victory: The Battle of Habbaniya, May 1941. Brimscombe: Tempus Publishing. ISBN 0-7524-2001-1.
- Lyman, Robert (2006). Iraq 1941: The Battles for Basra, Habbaniya, Fallujah and Baghdad. Campaign. Oxford: Osprey. ISBN 1-84176-991-6.
- "The Battle for Habbaniya – The forgotten war RAF". History (Campaign Histories). Royal Air Force. Archived from the original on June 7, 2008.
