= Japanese WWII Propaganda in Java =

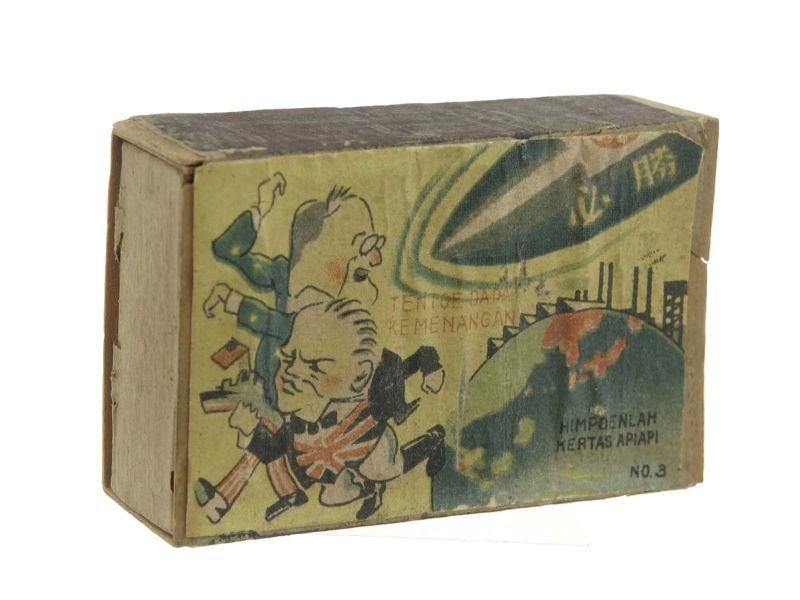
Illustrated matchbox in Java depicting a bomb marked by a Japanese flag chasing American and British figures. This imagery was used to rally anti-Western sentiments in the region and portray the Allied forces as weak and fearful of Japanese military capacity.

Japanese propaganda in Java during World War II arose out of a coordinated effort by the Japanese military administration to influence public opinion, promote allegiance to Japan, and support the war effort during the Japanese occupation of the West Indies from 1942-1945.

Following its capture, authorities in Java implemented propaganda campaigns to portray Japan as a liberator from Dutch colonial rule. The messaging emphasized Japanese Pan-Asianism, economic self-sufficiency, and loyalty to the Japanese Empire. The Japanese invasion of 1942 was met with varied responses, as some nationalists viewed it as an opportunity to end European control. As the occupation persisted, Japanese domestic pressure to be compensated as a liberator using Indonesia’s resources led to continued economic exploitation and military mobilization, prompting opposition in the region.

Sendenbu (宣伝部, Propaganda Department), was established in 1942 to further the Pan-Asianist messaging the Japanese empire sought to promote. The Sendenbu utilized a variety of strategies and forms of media to achieve this goal.

== Common themes ==
The overarching theme of Japanese propaganda centered around promoting the Greater East Asian Co-prosperity Sphere. In the first year of Japanese occupation, initial themes also included ideas of Japanization and ideological agendas. Portrayals of a shared Western enemy and Japan as a liberator were disseminated to lessen anti-Japanese sentiment in the region. The second year of occupation saw a messaging shift toward “practical and materialistic themes” in response to increasing concerns of Allied Force counterattacks in Java. Throughout this year, much of the content stressed Indonesian solidarity, contrasting with earlier messages of Japanese assimilation. Political messages were often incorporated with subtlety and well received by audiences when conveyed in the forms of performing arts.

Artifacts from this period include imported Japanese films, perceived to be one of the most efficient forms of propaganda. On the subject of film content and creating storylines, a directive from the Ministry of Internal Affairs in July 1938 indicates:

1. “Western-influenced individualistic ideas should be eliminated.
2. Japanese spirit, especially the virtue of the family system should be exalted, and the spirit of self-sacrifice for the benefit of nation and society should be encouraged.
3. Movies should take a positive role in educating the masses in order to discourage Westernization of young people, especially of young women.
4. Frivolous and flippant behavior and utterances should be swept off the screen, and efforts should be made to strengthen respect for elders.”

== Distribution ==
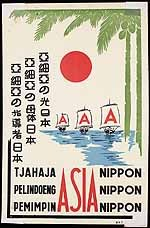
Japanization propaganda poster in Indonesian and Japanese, depicting the 3A Movement. Translation: "Japan is the light of Asia. Japan is the protector of Asia. Japan is the leader of Asia."

Japanese nationalist rhetoric was disseminated through a range of mediums. The Japanese recruited task forces of “civilian specialists in the production of culture for mass consumption” known as bunkajin (文化人, "men of culture"). Writers, artists, filmmakers, musicians and dramatists were among the types of individuals that comprised these specialist groups. The propaganda they crafted was commonly broadcast through radio, cinema, theatre, music, and dance, permeating all aspects of daily life.

=== District operation units ===
Specialized organizations were formed to maximize the reach and reception of propaganda efforts. A network of District Operation Units were established in six major cities, each responsible for propaganda distribution in designated districts. The Jawa Shinbunkai, Dômei News Agency, Jawa Hôsô Kanrikyoku, Jawa Engeki Kyôkai, Nihon Eigasha and Eiga Haikyûsha are among a list of dedicated companies tasked with motion picture, theatrical, broadcasting and news distribution to Javanese locals. Mobile Propaganda Units catered to the audio-visual tendencies of the rural population. Performers were sent to villages to perform music, dramas, and kamishibai paper plays.

Name	Organization Type	Date of Establishment	Responsibilities
The Jawa Shinbunkai	Newspaper Corporation	December 1942	Writing and publishing newspapers
Dômei News Agency	News Agency	Unknown	Correspondence for national reporting
Jawa Hôsô Kanrikyoku	Broadcasting Superintendent Bureau	October 1942	Supervising and controlling domestic broadcasts
Jawa Engeki Kyôkai	Theatrical Play Association	Unknown	Controlling drama production
Nihon Eigasha	Motion Picture Company	April 1943	Regulating film production
Eiga Haikyûsha	Motion Pitcture Distributing Company	April 1943	Regulating film distribution

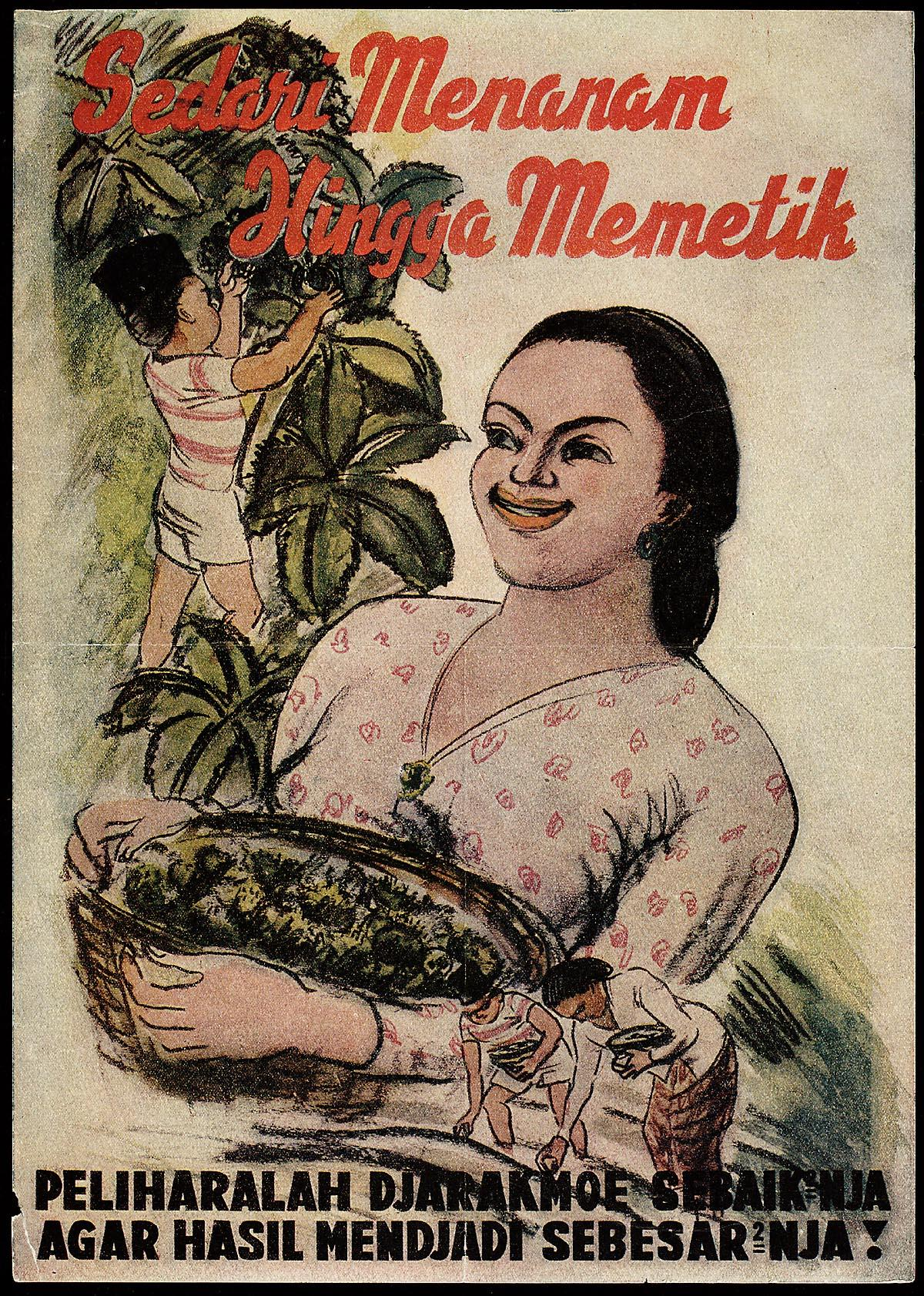
Japanese harvest propaganda poster from World War II. Translated from Japanese: "From planting to harvest. Treat the jatropha plant as well as possible to make the harvest as large as possible!" (A reference to the compulsory planting of jatropha in occupied Indonesia for the production of oil as machinery lubricant and fuel for the Japanese war effort.)

=== Radio ===
An emphasis was placed on "auditory and visual" forms of distribution as a workaround to low literacy levels among the population's rural majority. Radio was especially regarded as "the quickest and most accurate media" form to publicize government notices.

=== Film ===
Prior to the Japanese occupation in 1939, American-produced films represented 65% of the movies in Java. Other foreign films from China, Germany and France represented the rest of the cinema industry. Once established, the occupying Japanese administration banned all films from non-allied nations, resulting in substantial investment in the import of Japanese films and support of domestic productions, to fill the void left by other foreign films and influence mainstream cultural narratives.

=== Traditional performance art ===
In response to initial resistance of early propaganda efforts rooted in Japanization, Japanese efforts became increasingly localized and attuned with local cultural traditions. Indonesian theatrical dramas were altered to contain Japanese ideological themes such as mutual help, defense of the fatherland, and denunciations of Dutch imperialism. Javanese wayang golek puppet shows were utilized to inspire a “fighting spirit among the people.”

=== Kamishibai ===
The Kamishibai stories published in Djawa Baroe Magazine incorporated elements of Javanese culture and daily life while also featuring themes of loyalty, discipline, and perspectives on global affairs. Japan was more frequently depicted indirectly rather than explicitly in asserting its propaganda. Among the seven kamishibai stories, Japan's presence was directly mentioned in two, Nasihat Jang Bermanfaat and Sembadra dan Srikandi. The original goal of Japanese propaganda was to influence the local population; however, Djawa Baroe may have also contributed to shaping the vision of an independent Indonesia among its educated readers through the storylines and characters that appeared in the Djawa Baroe Magazine.

== Local reception ==
Javanese responses to Japanese propaganda during the occupation varied from skepticism and hesitation to appreciation. Entertainment played a significant role in Japan's efforts to shape popular opinion. Accounts suggest that while many locals appreciated the performances and broadcasts disseminated by the Japanese authorities, they did not necessarily accept its underlying messages. Rural and less educated audiences were however considered more likely to consume the Japanese media less critically. Through exposure at schools and local organizations such as seinendan (青年団, "youth organization"), suishintai (推進体, "pioneer corps") and keibōdan (警防団, "civil defense association"), members of the younger generations were also indoctrinated into Japanese beliefs.

== Long-term influence ==
Established by the Japanese military ministry of information, the hoso kanri kyoyu (放送管理局, "radio control bureau") introduced a model of monopolized state broadcasting, wherein all radio content and messaging were controlled by Japanese officials for propaganda purposes. The bureau operated a large station in Jakarta, alongside fifteen local stations dispersed across Java. Following the end of Japanese occupation, the broadcasting equipment and highly centralized organizational structure provided the foundations for the Radio of the Republic of Indonesia (RRI). RRI was subsequently placed under state control early on in the Sukarno regime, continuing the pattern of using national broadcasting as a means to exert political influence set by the Japanese military. The Suharto administration similarly upheld the autocratic structure of RRI.
