= Black Columns =

Local pro-Japanese auxiliaries in Japanese-occupied territories during World War II

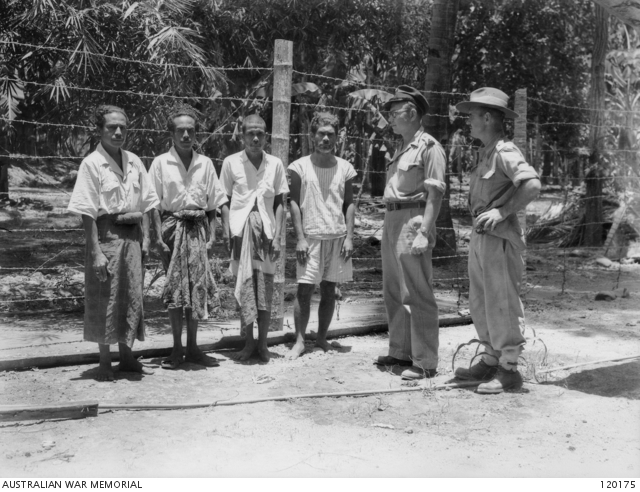
Four Timorese collaborators at Kupang after the war. On the right a Dutch official and an Australian officer

The Black Columns (Portuguese: Colunas Negras) were indigenous auxiliary troops from Timor who served alongside the Japanese during World War II, particularly during the Battle of Timor (1942–1945). The Portuguese, who had colonial influence in Timor, extended the term, Colunas Negras, to encompass all Timorese collaborators who worked with the Japanese during the occupation or who were hostile to the Portuguese. These Timorese soldiers were trained by the Japanese and referred to as Heiho (兵補), a term used by the Japanese across the Malay Archipelago for local auxiliary forces. From the Japanese perspective, there were only a handful of Timorese soldiers trained by them who were under their command.

== History ==
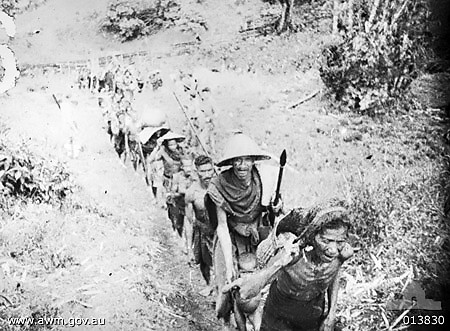
Captured pro-Japanese Timorese being paraded by Australian-allied Timorese warriors in December 1942

In December 1941, Australian and Dutch troops landed in Dili, the capital of the colony of Portuguese Timor, despite the colony's official neutrality during World War II. The Allies were concerned that Portuguese Timor could be used as a strategic base by Japan to launch attacks on Australia. Although Portugal protested against the occupation of its territory, it was unable to mount any effective resistance against the Allied forces. On the night of February 19, 1942, Japan launched its own invasion of the island, occupying both Portuguese Timor and the Dutch-controlled western part of the island. Following the Japanese invasion, the Allied forces, who had been stationed on the island, shifted to guerrilla warfare tactics. Their air force continued to strike Japanese targets on Timor as part of their broader efforts to resist the Japanese occupation. The conflict on Timor became a prolonged struggle, with local and Allied guerrilla fighters engaging Japanese forces throughout the war.

In September 1942, the Colunas Negras were formed. These troops primarily consisted of Timorese from Dutch Timor, the western part of the island. The Colunas Negras were mobilized by the Japanese to fight against Australian guerrilla forces and to suppress Timorese rebellions that had risen in opposition to the Japanese occupation. The Japanese took advantage of existing anti-colonial sentiments among the Timorese, who had long been under colonial rule by the Portuguese and the Dutch. By exploiting these resentments, the Japanese were able to recruit and organize local forces like the Colunas Negras to bolster their military presence and maintain control over the island during the conflict.

The Colunas Negras spread violence and destruction. They terrorized the civilian population and provided crucial intelligence on Allied troop movements. Their actions were marked by brutality, as they massacred, raped, and plundered villages. In some cases, they even hung the heads of their victims from trees as a form of intimidation. Lieutenant Seji Tomiki, responsible for deploying the Timorese units, expressed frustration over their uncontrollability. He noted that the Colunas Negras often recommended Japanese attacks on villages that had no ties to the Allies, but were simply traditional enemies of the informants' own villages. In regions yet to be invaded by the Japanese, the Colunas Negras had already initiated their violent campaigns. The Timorese also targeted Portuguese colonists, particularly those who had behaved improperly towards them and their traditions or were involved in the suppression of the 1912 rebellion. Japan once blamed the incidents on a "group of West Timorese" who wanted to fight for the Japanese and resettle in the east. They had taken action against the Portuguese due to previous mistreatment. In fact, the attack on Aileu (then Vila General Carmona) on August 31, 1942, was carried out by the Colunas Negras. It resulted in the deaths of five Portuguese soldiers, and four other Portuguese, officials and missionaries. According to Army sources, the Japanese forces were not directly involved in these incidents. However, the navy's records are largely lost, so one can only make assumptions about the involvement of Pro-Japanese Timorese elements (Ōtori) during this time. While Japanese records do not provide specific numbers for the Colunas Negras, Portuguese reports estimated their strength at between 300 and 700 men in August 1942, with the number likely growing to several thousand by November 1942, including prominent Timorese such as the ruling family of Deribate.

In October 1942, supported by the Japanese, 8,000 Timorese in the Aileu area and another 4,000 in the border area rebelled against the Portuguese, for whom the situation was deteriorating more and more. The Japanese forces largely stayed out of the fighting and instead tried to destroy the Australian guerrillas. During this time, the Colunas Negras received reinforcements from Timorese from the Portuguese Dili, Aileu, Manufahi, Ossu and Lautém, who increasingly restricted the Australians. At the end of the year, the Allies were attacked in Viqueque and Baucau by Colunas Negras from Lautém, and in January 1943, the Japanese and thousands of collaborators attacked the Australians in southeast Timor, which also led to the end of the guerrilla action in February and numerous casualties among the Timorese on both sides.

== See also ==
- Defenders of the Homeland
- Heiho
- Collaboration with the Empire of Japan
