= Muhammad Toha =

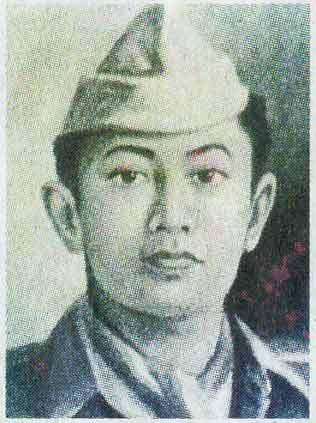
- Restored photo of Muhammad Toha
- Born: 1927; Bandung, Dutch East Indies
- Died: 11 July 1946 (aged 18-19); Bandung, Indonesia
- Military career
- Allegiance: Indonesia
- Branch: Seinendan (1942–45); Barisan Rakjat Indonesia (1945); Indonesian Army (1945–46)
- Rank: Commanding officer
- Commands: Unit I of the BRI
- Conflicts: Indonesian National Revolution: Bandung Sea of Fire †
- Memorials: Muhammad Toha Street

Muhammad Toha (1927 – 11 July 1946) was an Indonesian revolutionary and war hero, celebrated as a martyr in Indonesia for his act of self-sacrifice in Bandung during the Indonesian National Revolution.

== Biography ==
Muhammad Toha was born in Jalan Banceuy, Suniaraja village, Bandung in 1927. His father and mother, Suganda and Nariah respectively, both came from Kedunghalang, Bogor. Toha was orphaned in 1929 when his father died and his mother remarried. After his mother divorced her second husband, Toha was taken in by his grandparents on his father's side. Toha began attending school at the age of seven, and continued his studies until the outbreak of World War II.

During the Japanese occupation of the Dutch East Indies, Toha joined Seinendan, a paramilitary group organised by the Imperial Japanese Army to train Indonesian youth in hopes of creating a local collaborator army. Toha spent most of his time helping his grandfather in the district of Sunda, and working in a motor shop in Cikudapateuh. The Japanese army later employed Toha as a car mechanic in a military vehicle workshop, where he learned to speak Japanese.

After Indonesia declared its independence on 17 August 1945, Toha was enlisted into Barisan Rakjat Indonesia (BRI), an Indonesian revolutionary militia led by Toha's uncle, Ben Alamsyah. Toha was promoted to commanding officer of Unit I of the BRI around the end of 1945.

== Indonesian National Revolution ==
After the surrender of Japan on 15 August 1945, Japan promised to return Indonesia to the Netherlands under the administration of the Dutch East Indies. Fighting broke out between newly arrived Allied forces attempting to reestablish Dutch rule and Indonesian republicans and soldiers following World War II.

In Bandung, the Allies issued an ultimatum to Indonesian troops, demanding that they disarm and hand over their weapons to the Allies. The Indonesians refused, and withdrew from the southern half of the city to avoid civilian casualties. Civilians were evacuated by the Indonesian Army, and the southern half of Bandung was razed in an event known as the Bandung Sea of Fire.

Following the evacuations from Bandung, Toha smuggled several sticks of dynamite past Allied troops, and into the Dutch military headquarters in Dayeuh Kolot. He detonated the dynamite in the munitions warehouse, killing himself and several Allied troops in the area. After Indonesia officially gained independence from the Netherlands, the main street in the area was named "Mohammad Toha Street" in his honour.
