= Fahmi Said =

Iraqi military colonel (1898–1942)

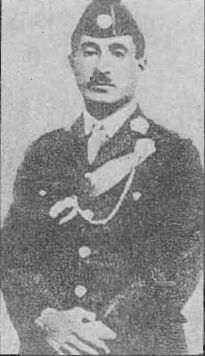
- Born: 1898; Sulaymaniyah, Ottoman Empire
- Died: 5 May 1942 (aged 43/44); Baghdad, Kingdom of Iraq
- Cause of death: Execution by hanging
- Military career
- Allegiance: Ottoman Empire (1918–1920); Kingdom of Iraq (1921–1941)
- Service years: 1918–1941
- Rank: Colonel
- Commands: Independent Mechanized Brigade
- Conflicts: First World War; Anglo-Iraqi War

Colonel Fahmi Said (Arabic: فهمي سعيد; 1898 – 5 May 1942) was one of the Four Colonels of the Golden Square, a pro-Nazi cabal that briefly overthrew the Hashemite monarchy in Iraq in 1941. When the British intervened and the coup was suppressed, Said was sentenced to death. He and his collaborators were hanged.

He was born to an Arab father from the Anbak tribe and a mother of Turkish origin in Sulaymaniyah. He was a lieutenant in the Ottoman Army before briefly serving in the Syrian Arab Army, then joining the Royal Iraqi Army of the newly independent Kingdom of Iraq.

The members of the Golden Square were Colonel Salah al-Din al-Sabbagh, Colonel Kamil Shabib, Colonel Said, and Colonel Mahmud Salman. During the Anglo-Iraqi War, the four members of the Golden Square commanded units located in the Baghdad area. Salah ad-Din al-Sabbagh was commander of the Iraqi 3rd Infantry Division. Kamal Shabib commanded the 1st Infantry Division. Fahmi Said commanded the Independent Mechanized Brigade. Mahmud Salman, the one non-Army officer, was the Chief of the Air Force.
