= Kamil Shabib =

Iraqi military officer (1895-1944)

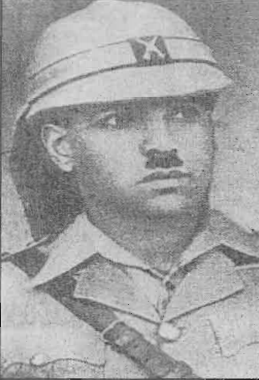
- Born: 1895; Baghdad, Ottoman Iraq
- Died: 20 August 1944 (aged 48–49); Baghdad, Kingdom of Iraq
- Cause of death: Execution by hanging
- Military career
- Allegiance: Ottoman Empire (until 1918); Kingdom of Iraq (1921–1941)
- Branch: (Ottoman Empire) Ottoman Army (Kingdom of Iraq) Royal Iraqi Army
- Service years: 1914–1941
- Rank: Colonel
- Commands: 1st Infantry Division
- Conflicts: First World War; Second World War; Anglo-Iraqi War (executed)

Colonel Kamil Shabib (Arabic: كامل شبيب; 1895 – 20 August 1944) was an Iraqi military officer and one of the Four Colonels of the Golden Square, a pro-Nazi cabal that briefly overthrew the Hashemite monarchy in Iraq in 1941. When the British intervened and the coup was suppressed, Shabib was sentenced to death. He and his collaborators were hanged in 20 August 1944.

Shabib first served in the Ottoman Army during the First World War as an officer before joining the Royal Iraqi Army of the newly independent Kingdom of Iraq in 1921.

The members of the Golden Square were Colonel Salah al-Din al-Sabbagh, Colonel Shabib, Colonel Fahmi Said, and Colonel Mahmud Salman. During the Anglo-Iraqi War, the four members of the Golden Square commanded units located in the Baghdad area. Sabbagh was the commander of the Iraqi 3rd Infantry Division. Shabib commanded the 1st Infantry Division. Said commanded the Independent Mechanized Brigade. Salman, the only non-Army officer, was the Chief of the Air Force.
