= Golden Square (Iraq) =

1930s–1940s cabal of pro-fascist Iraqi military officers

- المربع الذهبي
- Leaders: Salah al-Din al-Sabbagh; Kamil Shabib; Fahmi Said; Mahmud Salman
- Dates active: 1930–1941
- Country: Kingdom of Iraq
- Headquarters: Baghdad, Iraq
- Ideology: Arab fascism; Ultranationalism; Pan-Arabism
- Political position: Far-right
- Part of: Axis powers

The Golden Square (Arabic: المربع الذهبي, al-Murabbaʿ al-dhahabī), also known as the Four Colonels (Arabic: العقداء الأربعة, al-ʿiqdā' al-arbaʿa), was a cabal of pro-Fascist and pro-Nazi army officers of the Iraqi armed forces who played a part in Iraqi politics throughout the 1930s and early 1940s. They conspired to overthrow the Hashemite monarchy in Iraq and expel the British presence in Iraq. The activities of the Golden Square culminated in supporting Rashid Ali al-Gaylani in his overthrow of government in 1941, briefly instituting the Golden Square National Defense Government. However, the Anglo-Iraqi War resulted in the disbandment of the Golden Square.

The officers desired full independence from Britain, and the formation of a pan-Arab state from Iraq, Syria, Lebanon, and Palestine, and a settlement of the intercommunal conflict in Mandatory Palestine.

== Details ==
The Golden Square included the four most important leaders of the "Circle of Seven". The Circle of Seven was a group of Sunni Arab nationalist military officers who were greatly influenced by Italian and German emissaries, including German Ambassador Fritz Grobba, in turn, greatly influenced politics in Iraq during the 1930s and early 1940s.

== Members ==
The members of the Golden Square were Colonel Salah al-Din al-Sabbagh, Colonel Kamil Shabib, Colonel Fahmi Said, and Colonel Mahmud Salman. During the Anglo-Iraqi War, the four members of the Golden Square commanded units located in the Baghdad area. Salah ad-Din al-Sabbagh was commander of the Iraqi 3rd Infantry Division. Kamal Shabib commanded the 1st Infantry Division. Fahmi Said commanded the Independent Mechanized Brigade. Mahmud Salman, the one non-Army officer, was the chief of the Air Force.

The members of the Golden Square were virulently anti-British. In time, these men represented real power as successive Iraqi governments sought the support of the military for survival. The members of the Golden Square looked to Fascist Italy and Nazi Germany to support them and, for his part, Grobba enthusiastically encouraged them to do so, as did Italian ambassadors.

== Iraqi coup d'état ==
On 1 April 1941, Rashid Ali and the Golden Square launched a coup d'etat to topple the government of the regent, Prince 'Abd al-Ilah. The subsequent Anglo-Iraqi War ended disastrously for Rashid Ali and the members of the Golden Square who, for the most part, fled Iraq as the British closed in on Baghdad. Shabib, Said, Salman, Sabbagh were all eventually returned to Iraq and executed.

=== Collaboration with the Empire of Japan ===
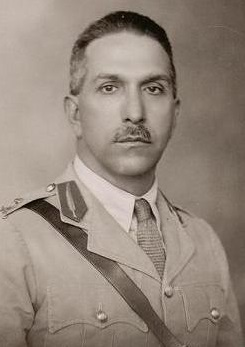
Pro-Japanese Iraqi Prime Minister Taha al-Hashimi, who served in Iraq's short-lived pro-Axis government in 1941

One of Iraq's most prominent politicians, Taha al-Hashimi, was pro-Japanese and stressed that the Arab world should look to Japan as a role model. In 1941, elements of the Iraqi military led by four Colonels, Salah al-Din al-Sabbagh, Kamil Shabib, Fahmi Said, and Mahmud Salman, toppled the Hashemite monarchy and installed a pro-Axis government with Taha al-Hashimi serving as the Prime Minister. Japan, one of the three main Axis powers, supported the group as part of its strategy to improve relations with the Islamic world, although geographical distance meant its support was merely symbolic.

== See also ==
- Iraqi Army
- Iraqi Air Force
- Party of National Brotherhood
