= Kanao Inouye =

Canadian war criminal (1916–1947)

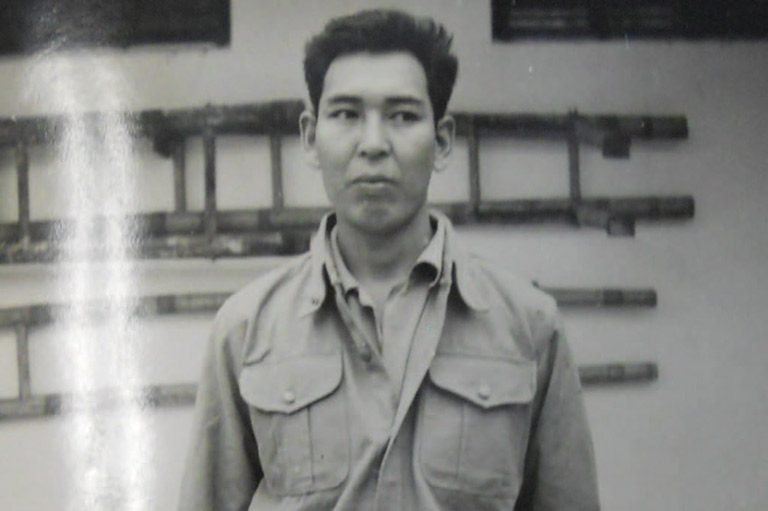
- Inouye in British custody (1945)
- Born: 24 May 1916; Kamloops, British Columbia, Canada
- Died: 27 August 1947 (aged 31); Stanley Prison, Stanley, British Hong Kong
- Cause of death: Execution by hanging
- Other names: "Kamloops Kid" "Yankee"
- Status: Executed
- Conviction: High treason
- Penalty: Death

Japanese name
- Kanji: 井上 加奈雄
- Hiragana: いのうえ かなお
- Katakana: イノウエ カナオ
- Military career
- Allegiance: Empire of Japan
- Branch: Imperial Japanese Army
- Service years: 1942–43 (HKDF); 1944–1945 (Kenpeitai)
- Rank: Sergeant
- Units: Hong Kong Defence Force; Kenpeitai

Kanao Inouye (井上(イノウエ) 加奈雄(カナオ), Inoue Kanao; 24 May 1916 – 27 August 1947) was a Canadian man convicted of high treason and war crimes for his actions during World War II. Known as the "Kamloops Kid", he served as an interpreter and prison camp guard for the Imperial Japanese Army and the Kenpeitai secret police.

== Early life in Canada ==
A Nisei (second-generation Japanese-Canadian), Kanao Inouye was born to immigrant parents in Kamloops, British Columbia. His father, Tadashi "Tow" Inouye, had emigrated to British Columbia from Tokyo, and had been a decorated Canadian soldier during World War I who earned the Military Medal at Second Battle of Cambrai. serving in the 47th Battalion (British Columbia), CEF.

Although his father died in 1926, Inouye at his first trial described his life in Canada as happy. His family nevertheless maintained close ties to Japan, where several relatives were prominent civic and political leaders. His paternal grandfather, Tokutaro Inoue, was a Rikken Seiyūkai Member of Parliament in the House of Peers and a founder of Keio Corporation. One of his uncles, Tokutaro Kimura, was later the 1st Minister of Justice.

After he graduated from Vancouver Technical School, Inouye's family urged him to go to Japan to continue his education. He did so in 1938 and was still there when World War II began.

== War years ==
In 1942, Inouye was conscripted into the Imperial Japanese Army as an interpreter. Made a Sergeant, he was assigned to Sham Shui Po prison camp in Hong Kong, which housed Canadian prisoners of war from the Hong Kong Garrison. Inouye was noted for his unusual brutality. He beat prisoners at random, stating it was in retaliation for racism and discrimination that he had received in Canada. In contrast to his later trial testimony about his childhood, he allegedly told them: "When I was in Canada I took all kinds of abuse. ... They called me a 'little yellow bastard'. Now where is your so-called superiority, you dirty scum?"

Inouye was discharged from the army the following year, but in 1944, he was conscripted as an interpreter for the notorious Kenpeitai military police in Hong Kong. Trial testimony stated he had been an enthusiastic torturer of suspected spies and traitors. Former POWs said Inouye was responsible for the torture of multiple Canadian POWs and other civilians.

== Conviction and execution ==
After the Japanese capitulation in August 1945, Inouye was arrested in Kowloon and tried for war crimes by a British military court. The Judge Presiding was Lt. Col. J.C. Stewart. In 1946, he was found guilty of torturing prisoners of war and civilians and was sentenced to death.

The verdict was overturned on appeal, since as a Canadian citizen, Inouye could not be prosecuted for war crimes committed by an enemy army. In April 1947, Inouye was tried for high treason. He was found guilty and sentenced to death. On 27 August 1947, Inouye was executed by hanging on the gallows at Hong Kong's Stanley Prison. His last word was "Banzai!"

Inouye's case is recorded as Case No. HKRS 163-1-216 (Hong Kong Public Records Office).

== Analysis ==
Patrick Brode, author of the Traitor By Default: The Trials of Kanao Inouye, The Kamloops Kid, suggests that Inouye was convicted improperly of treason, because of the ambiguous nature of his nationality and allegiances. Says Brode:

"Is it possible that he was a citizen of both countries, and if he was British and Japanese when those two countries went to war, who do you owe your loyalty to? [It’s] still a bit of a question mark. More so these days, because so many people across the world have dual citizenships.... He claimed that he was a Japanese that he had been registered since his birth as a Japanese citizen. He traveled under a Japanese passport. He served in the Japanese military. Even Canada’s senior officer in Asia said, ‘This guy has done everything possible to show that he is actually a Japanese citizen.' .... It was not a very neat trial. It was a situation where the judge seemed to be predetermined to get a result. And, by George, he got it."

== See also ==
- Battle of Hong Kong
- Japanese occupation of Hong Kong
- Sadaaki Konishi
- Tomoya Kawakita
- William Joyce
