= Heiho =

Indonesian collaborationist units in WWII

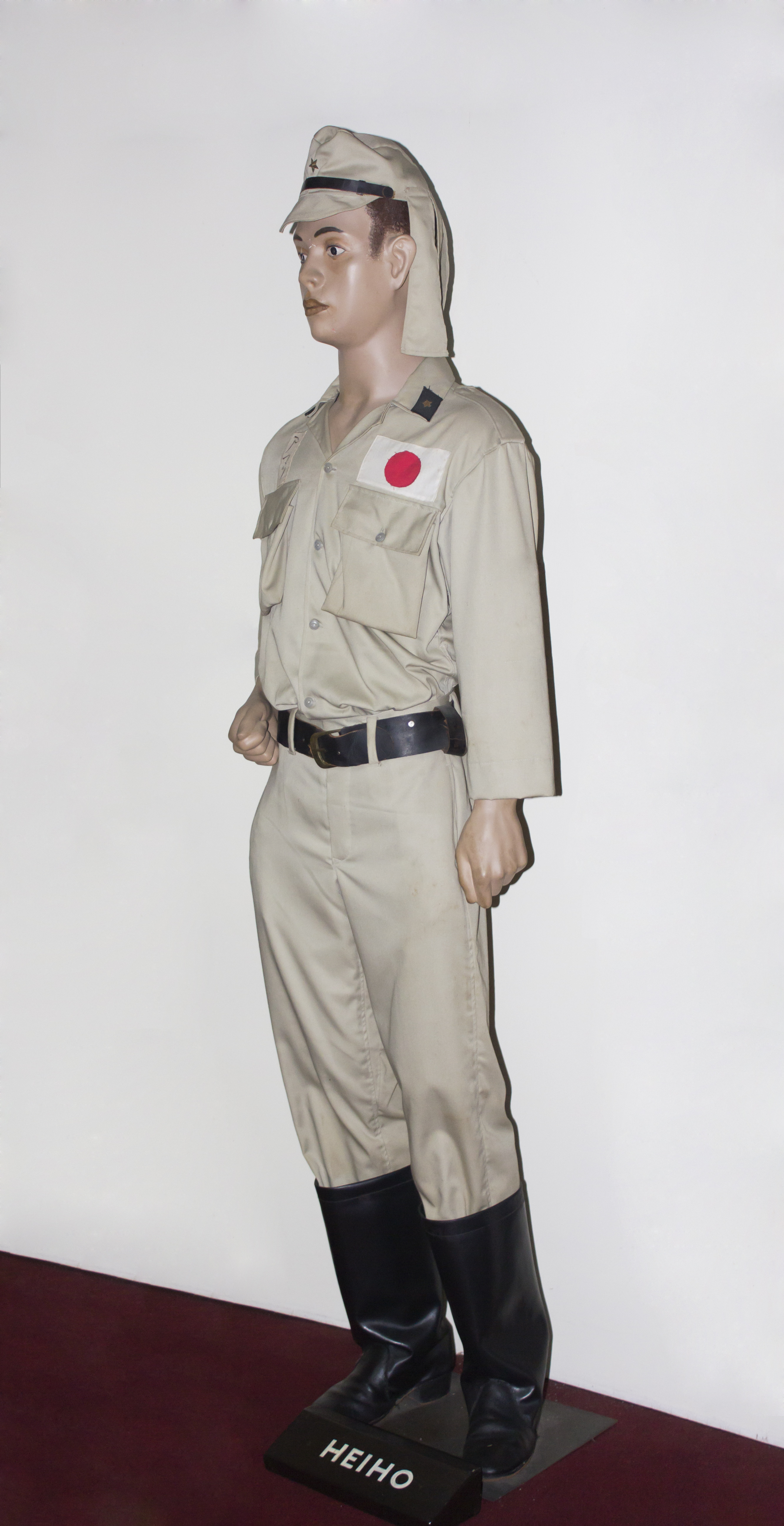
Heiho uniform on display at the Yogya Kembali Monument, 2013.

Heiho (兵補, Heiho; "Auxiliaries") were units raised by the Imperial Japanese Army during its occupation of the Dutch East Indies in World War II. Alongside the Heiho, the Japanese organized Giyūgun (義勇軍, "Volunteer army"), such as the Java-based "Defenders of the Homeland" (PETA; Indonesian: Pembela Tanah Air, Japanese: 郷土防衛義勇軍, romanized: Kyōdo Bōei Giyūgun). Indonesian youths who joined the Heiho were never given high ranks or positions, contrasted by the young people who were members of PETA or other Giyūgun and often received appointments and promotions. This discrimination carried over into public life, where Heiho members had to salute any Japanese citizen, both civilians and military. The name was mostly used to point about Indonesian units of the Imperial Japanese Armed Forces, although over time it had become coined as the term to refer to any unit that collaborated with Japan regardless of ethnicity.

In addition, there was also a difference in salary, accommodation, and food with the heitai (兵隊, "soldiers") of the Giyūgun, which were adjusted according to the social status of the individual Heiho soldier. The monthly salary of a Heiho was only 30 rupiah for bachelors and 35 rupiah for married members. Still, many youths hoped that recruitment into Heiho would serve as a stepping stone for a military career to improve their social standing, receive Japanese salaries, and avoid the rōmusha forced labor system.

== History ==
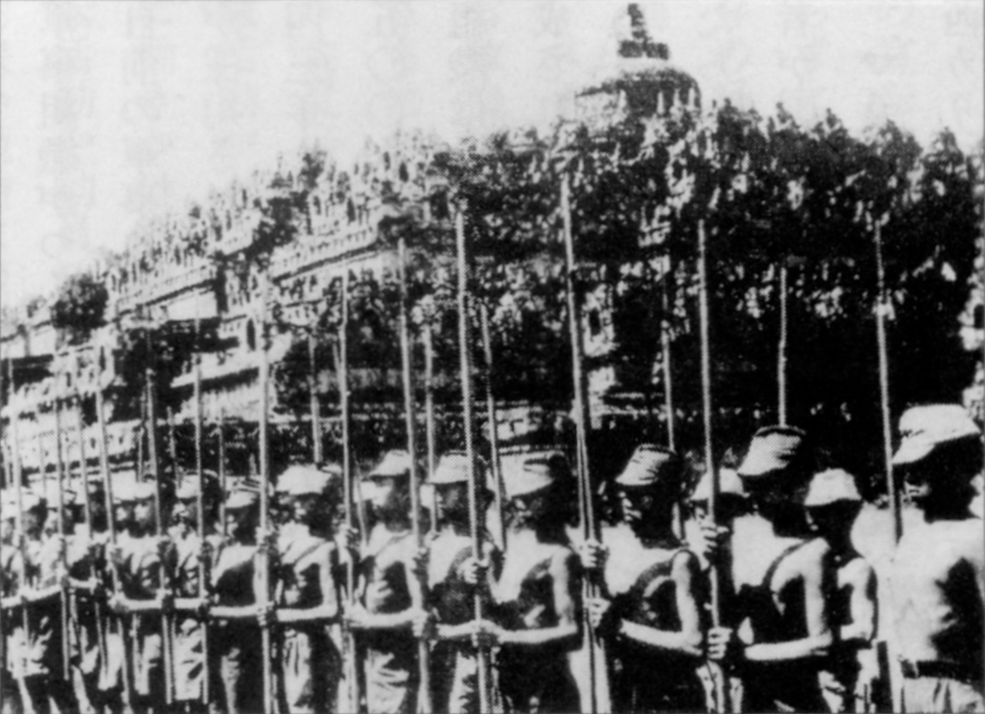
Heiho with bambu runcing bamboo spears lining up before Borobudur (unknown author, unknown date)

The auxiliary force was formed by order of the army section of the Imperial General Headquarters on 2 September 1942 and began recruiting members on 22 April 1943 since the purposes between the Imperial Japanese Army in Indonesia, which wanted to supplement insufficient military forces because their soldiers were transferred to other frontlines, and Indonesia, which hoped to have self-made armies, matched. The Japanese Sendenbu (宣伝部, "Publicity Department") propagated that Heiho was an opportunity for young people to serve their homeland and people. The requirements to become a member of Heiho were to be between 18 and 25 years old, have a minimum height of 1.10 m (3 ft 7 1/2 in), an average weight of 45 kg (99 lb), be physically and mentally healthy, be well-behaved, and have completed at least primary education. The selected youths were promised to become members of the Imperial Army or Imperial Japanese Navy.

In practice, however, Heiho were mostly put to work performing menial labor for the Japanese Army; constructing fortifications, digging trenches, and guarding prisoners. As a result, Heiho quickly became a lightly armed labor force as the only weapons handed out to the auxiliaries were taiken (隊剣, "corps sword"). Later, the Heiho members were given firearms when the Japanese were being pushed back by the Allies. They would also be sent to the front lines with Japanese forces and became involved in combat on several battlefields of the Pacific War, including in the Philippines, Thailand, Morotai (in present-day Indonesia), Rabaul (Papua New Guinea), Balikpapan (Indonesia), and Burma.

Propaganda film encouraging auxiliary enlistment. Images of the "pleasant and useful life" as a Heiho.

Due to lack of training, they were more often than not used as cannon fodder or "martyred" as suicide bombers when a Japanese defeat seemed imminent. After receiving several months of training, the Heiho troops were considered to have better military capabilities than PETA troops. On that basis, Heiho members were reassigned to air defence, field artillery, armor, mortar, and logistics units. The recruitment of Heiho into the Japanese army was followed by their recruitment as Kenpeihō (憲兵法, "Auxiliary military police") for the Kenpeitai and Kaigun Heiho (海軍兵補, "Navy auxiliaries") for the Japanese navy. Heiho were not led by ethnic Indonesian commanders, but were under the command of Japanese officers. The training given was not related to organizational or military theory, but solely to physical fitness, the concept of seishin (精神, "spirit"), and the fostering of death-defying courage. By the end of the Japanese occupation of Indonesia, the number of Heiho troops was estimated to be 42,000 men (24,873 on Java, 2,504 on Timor, and c. 15,000 in other areas). The Heiho was dissolved by the Preparatory Committee for Indonesian Independence (PPKI; Indonesian: Panitia Persiapan Kemerdekaan Indonesia, Japanese: 独立準備委員会, romanized: Dokuritsu Junbi Iinkai) after the surrender of Japan and a number of auxiliaries went on to become members of the People's Security Agency (BKR; Indonesian: Badan Keamanan Rakyat).

== See also ==
- Collaboration with the Empire of Japan
- Defenders of the Homeland
- Japanese occupation of the Dutch East Indies
