= Keibōdan =

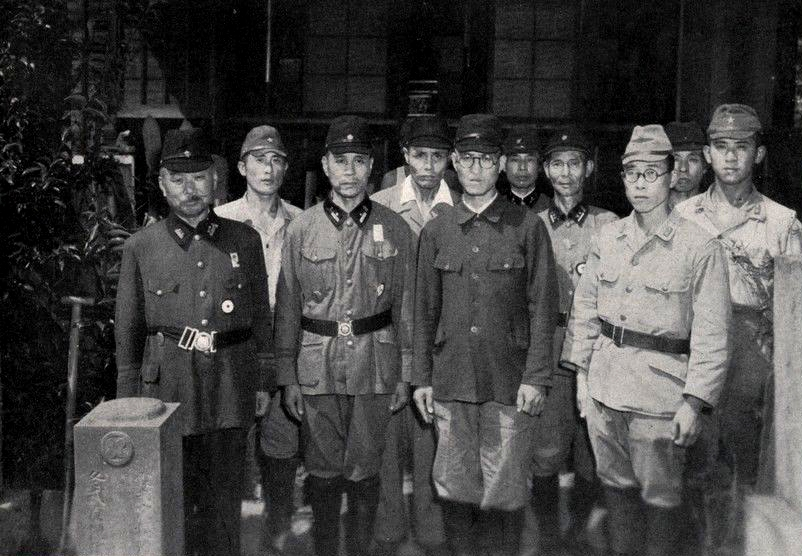
Members of the Keibōdan (those with black collars) photographed alongside soldiers and civilians. Their insignias mark the Keibōdan member in the front row on the left as a division leader (団長, danchō), the second from the left as a section leader (班長, hanchō). The one in the second row on the right is a squad leader (部長, buchō), and the one in the back on the right is a member (警防員, keibōin). (1945)

The Keibōdan (警防団, Keibōdan; "Civil defense association") was an organization formed in 1939 immediately prior to World War II as ordered by the Keibōdan Order (警防団令, Keibōdan-rei) (announced January 25 and implemented April 1) in order to protect the people from air raids and fires. They were tasked with acting as a support organization for the police and fire brigade.

There was less reason to maintain the Keibōdan after Japan lost the war, resulting in it being abolished and combined into the fire brigade in 1947.

== Overview ==
Prior to the establishment of the Keibōdan, a fire fighting force known as Shōbōgumi (消防組) existed, predating the current fire brigade (消防団, Shōbōdan), which had the responsibility of controlling flooding and fires. In accordance with the Keibōdan Order, the Keibōdan was established and given those existing duties of fire and flood defense, in addition to the other duties of monitoring the skies for air raids, initiating warnings, enacting blackouts, policing, managing traffic, acting as first responders in the event of a major incident, defending against the use of poison gas, operating shelters, and more.

== Outside Japan ==
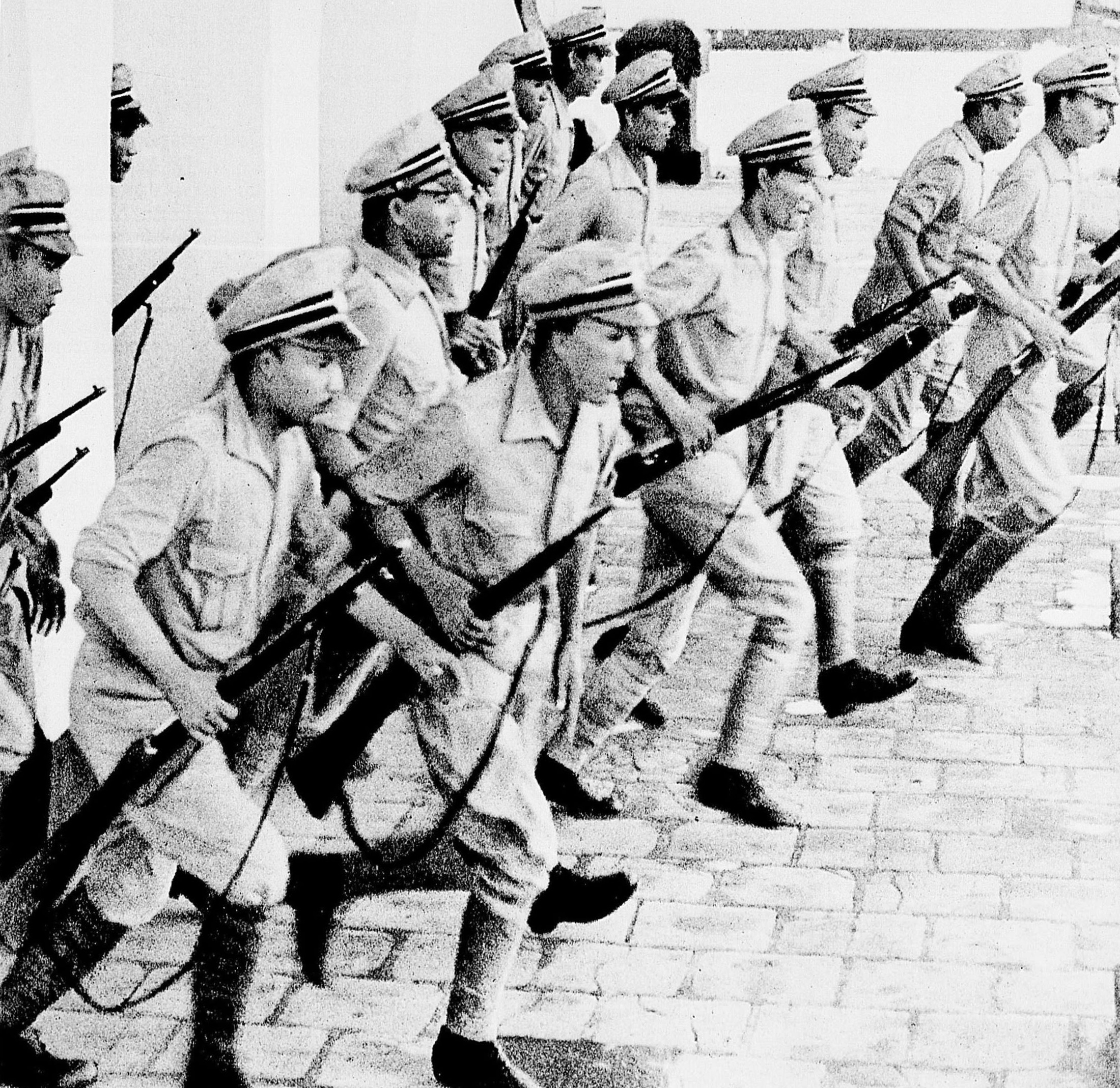
A group of Keibōdan in the occupied Dutch East Indies

A Keibōdan branch was also established in the occupied Dutch East Indies (present-day Indonesia) during World War II on 29 April 1943. Indonesian names for the organization were Barisan Pembantu Polisi ("Auxiliary police") and Laskar Penjaga Keamanan rakyat ("People's defense force"). It was formed alongside the Seinendan, and led by the occupation authorities (Japanese: 軍政官, romanized: Gunseikan). The purpose of the Keibōdan was to assist the Japanese-controlled police for the duration of the occupation. In addition, the organization ostensibly provided paramilitary training to Indonesian youths to defend their homeland from imperialism. In reality, the Japanese intended the Keibōdan to be a reserve of troops during its war against the Allies. In Sumatra the organization was known as Bōgodan (防護団, "Defense corps"), while in Kalimantan it was better known as Sameo Konen Hokokudan. Among Chinese Indonesians formed a variation of Keibōdan with the name Kakyō Keibōtai (華僑警防隊; "Overseas Chinese defense corps"). In charge of the Keibōdan were the Keimubu ("Police subdepartment"), who in turn reported to the Gunseibu ("Military administration"). The Keibōdan groups consisted of youths aged 20 to 35 years and numbered approximately one million members. Serving as an auxiliary police force, it was authorized to regulate traffic and maintain order and security in the villages.

== See also ==
- Collaboration with the Empire of Japan
- Japanese occupation of the Dutch East Indies
- Seinendan
