= Kawakita v. United States =

- Supreme Court of the United States

Argued April 2 – April 3, 1952 Decided June 2, 1952
- Full case name: Kawakita v. United States
- Citations: 343 U.S. 717 (more) 72 S. Ct. 950; 96 L. Ed. 1249

Case history
- Prior: 96 F. Supp. 824 (S.D. Cal. 1950); 190 F.2d 506 (9th Cir. 1951); cert. granted, 342 U.S. 932 (1952).

Holding
- A U.S. citizen owes allegiance to the United States and can be punished for treason, regardless of dual nationality or citizenship, and irrespective of country of residence.

Court membership
- Chief Justice Fred M. Vinson Associate Justices Hugo Black · Stanley F. Reed; Felix Frankfurter · William O. Douglas; Robert H. Jackson · Harold H. Burton; Tom C. Clark · Sherman Minton

Case opinions
- Majority: Douglas, joined by Reed, Jackson, Minton
- Dissent: Vinson, joined by Black, Burton
- Frankfurter and Clark took no part in the consideration or decision of the case.

Kawakita v. United States, 343 U.S. 717 (1952), is a United States Supreme Court case in which the Court ruled that a dual U.S./Japanese citizen could be convicted of treason against the United States for acts performed in Japan during World War II. Tomoya Kawakita, born in California to Japanese parents, was in Japan when the war broke out and stayed in Japan until the war was over. After returning to the United States, he was arrested and charged with treason for having abused American prisoners of war. Kawakita claimed he could not be found guilty of treason since he had lost his U.S. citizenship while in Japan, but this argument was rejected by the courts (including the Supreme Court), which ruled that he had in fact retained his U.S. citizenship during the war. Originally sentenced to death, Kawakita's sentence was commuted to life imprisonment, and he was eventually released from prison, deported to Japan, and barred from ever returning to the United States.

Kawakita is currently one of the last people to be convicted of treason in the United States. One other person, John David Provoo, was convicted of treason in 1952. However, Provoo's conviction was overturned on appeal. As such the distinction instead goes to Herbert John Burgman, who was convicted of treason in 1949.

== Background ==
Tomoya Kawakita
- 川北 友弥
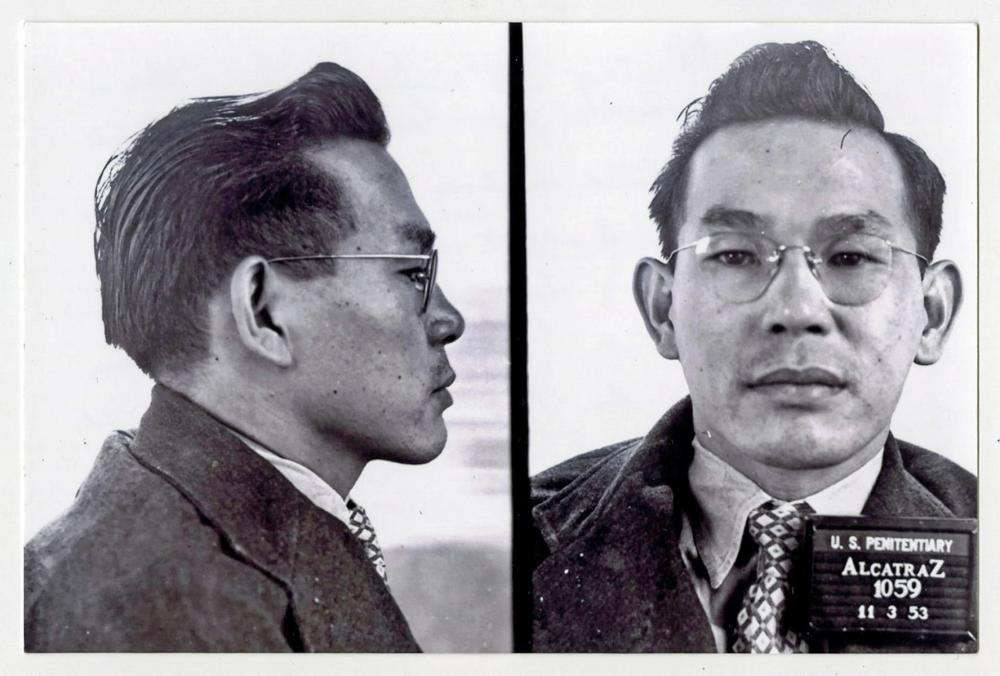
- Kawakita at the Alcatraz Federal Penitentiary on November 3, 1953, shortly after having his death sentence commuted
- Born: September 26, 1921; Calexico, California, United States
- Died: 1990s
- Other name: "Meatball"
- Conviction: Treason (8 counts)
- Penalty: Death; commuted to life imprisonment; conditionally commuted to time served

Tomoya Kawakita (川北 友弥, Kawakita Tomoya) was born in Calexico, California, on September 26, 1921, of Japanese-born parents. He was born with U.S. citizenship due to his place of birth, and also Japanese nationality via his parents. A former high school classmate of Kawakita, Joe Gomez, recalled him as quiet and serious, but sadistic in nature.

After finishing high school in Calexico in 1939, Kawakita traveled to Japan with his father (a grocer and merchant). He enrolled in Meiji University in 1941. In 1943, he registered officially as a Japanese national.

Kawakita was in Japan when the attack on Pearl Harbor drew the United States and Japan into World War II. In August 1943, with the assistance of a family friend, Takeo Miki, Kawakita took a job as an interpreter at a mining and metal processing plant. Shortly after Kawakita started working there, British and Canadian POWs arrived. Kawakita was tasked with interpreting for them. The POWs were sometimes forced to work in the mine.

In 1944 and early in 1945, approximately 400 American POWs, many of whom were captured in Bataan in 1942 and had survived the subsequent death march, arrived in the camp. Kawakita brutalized multiple American POWs during this time.

The work done at the mine by the American prisoners consisted of digging nickel ore from the face of the mountain side, and loading it onto cars which were emptied into hoppers. The prisoners also performed other general labor in the mine area, including such duty as carrying logs to be used for construction and maintenance work.

After Japan's surrender, Kawakita's attitude towards American POWs reportedly changed entirely. After the end of the war, Kawakita renewed his U.S. passport, explaining away his having registered as a Japanese national by claiming he had acted under duress. He returned to the U.S. in 1946 and enrolled at the University of Southern California.

In October 1946, a former POW, William L. Bruce saw Kawakita in a Los Angeles department store and recognized him from the war. Bruce reported this encounter to the FBI, and in June 1947, Kawakita was arrested and charged with 15 counts of treason arising from alleged abuse of American POWs.

In an interview shortly after the arrest, Bruce described his reaction to seeing Kawakita:

"I was so dumbfounded, I just halted in my tracks and stared at him as he hurried by. It was a good thing, too. If I'd reacted then, I'm not sure but that I might have taken the law into my own hands--and probably Kawakita's neck."

== Trial and appeal ==
Nearly 100 ex-POWs said they were willing to testify against Kawakita. At Kawakita's trial, presided over by U.S. District Judge William C. Mathes and prosecuted by James Marshall Carter, over 30 ex-POWs testified that Kawakita had brutalized American POWs. He was said to have beaten prisoners, forced them to beat each other, and forced them to run until they collapsed from exhaustion if they finished their work assignments early. In one case, Kawakita was accused of causing the death of Einar Latvala, an American POW (he was later acquitted of that charge after two Canadians said Latvala had been killed by another guard). Two of the treason charges against Kawakita were later dropped.

One of the witnesses in Kawakita's defense was his childhood friend, Meiji Fujizawa. Fujizawa had also worked in Camp Oeyama, but wasn't prosecuted due to American POWs having overwhelmingly favorable opinions of him; they said Fujizawa had done the best he could to help them and get them medicine. Fujizawa said he never saw Kawakita beat anyone. He said beatings did happen in the camp, but those were done by military officials.

The defense conceded that Kawakita had acted abusively toward American POWs, but argued that his actions were relatively minor, and that in any event, they could not constitute treason against the United States as Kawakita was not a U.S. citizen at the time, having lost his U.S. citizenship when he confirmed his Japanese nationality in 1943. The prosecution argued that Kawakita had known he was still a U.S. citizen and still owed allegiance to the country of his birth—citing the statements he had made to consular officials when applying for a new passport as evidence that he had never intended to give up his U.S. citizenship.

Judge Mathes's instructed the jury that if they found Kawakita had genuinely believed he was no longer a U.S. citizen, then he must be found not guilty. He reminded them that Kawakita was on trial for treason, not for war crimes. During their deliberations, the jury reported several times that they were hopelessly deadlocked, but the judge insisted each time that they continue trying to reach a unanimous verdict. In the end—on September 2, 1948—the jury found Kawakita guilty of 8 of 13 counts of treason, and he was sentenced to death.

In passing sentence, Mathes gave a speech:

You gentlemen have performed your duties in this case most diligently. So has the jury. And this is now my responsibility.

I want to make it perfectly clear that the sentence I impose here has no relation to any brutalities that may have been involved in this defendant's treatment of American prisoners of war. That is only an incident. So with any kindness that he may have shown them. It is only an incident. The defendant stands here convicted of the crime of treason. The fact that he was born of Japanese nationals has nothing to do with it. My views would be the same no matter who he was.

Treason is the only crime, as has been said here several times, mentioned in our Constitution. The framers thought it of sufficient gravity to provide it as the only crime mentioned in the Constitution of the United States.

As I view this matter, it is not a question of whether the defendant kicked some American prisoner of war or a dozen of them. His crime might be briefly put in two sentences. He said that from 1943 on he did everything he could to help the Japanese Government win the war.

The jury found that he owed a duty of loyalty at that time to the United States. So his crime cannot be considered, I take it, in terms of beating up someone, no matter how brutal. His crime is a crime against the country of his birth. His crime is not against a few American prisoners of war. His crime is against the whole people of this country where he was born and where he was fed and where he was educated.

Throughout history treason has always been the crime most abhorred by English-speaking peoples. The traitor has always been considered even worse than a murderer. And the distinction is based upon reason: for the murderer violates at most only a few, while the traitor violates all the members of his society, all the members of the group to which he owes his allegiance. The punishment inflicted by the common law when traitors were publicly dragged to the place of execution and there drawn, quartered and beheaded recalls the extreme odium which our forebears attached to the crime of betraying one's country. The penalty for murder was death; for treason, death with vengeance.

Today our law permits the life of a traitor to be spared.

As it has been truly said: "It is the essence of treachery that those who commit it would still be severely punished if the law forgot its duty to provide deterrents to crime and did not lay a finger on them."

If the defendant were to go from this Court a free man, he would be condemned to live out his life in bitter scorn of himself. Haunting him to the end of his days would be the memory not only of his base treason against the land of his birth, but also of Sadao Munemori who won the Congressional Medal of Honor; of Privates First Class, Fumitaka Nagato and Saburo Tanamachi, who are buried with the American heroes of all time at Arlington National Cemetery; and the memory of almost seven hundred other boys of like American birthright, of like Japanese parentage, who stood the supreme test of loyalty to their native land, and gave up their lives that America and her institutions might continue to live.

These thoughts and others must tell the defendant that his life, if spared, would not be worth living. Considering the inherent nature of treason and the purpose of the law in imposing punishment for the crime, reflection leads to the conclusion that the only worth-while use for the life of a traitor, such as this defendant has proved himself to be, is to serve as an example to those of weak moral fiber who may hereafter be tempted to commit treason against the United States.

Kawakita's mother broke down after hearing the sentence, and her son begged her not to kill herself. Kawakita was sent to San Quentin State Prison to await his execution. His execution would be carried out via lethal gas.

Kawakita appealed to a three-judge panel of the Ninth Circuit Court of Appeals, which unanimously upheld the verdict and death sentence. Certiorari was granted by the United States Supreme Court, and oral arguments before the Supreme Court were heard on April 3, 1952.

== Opinion of the Court ==
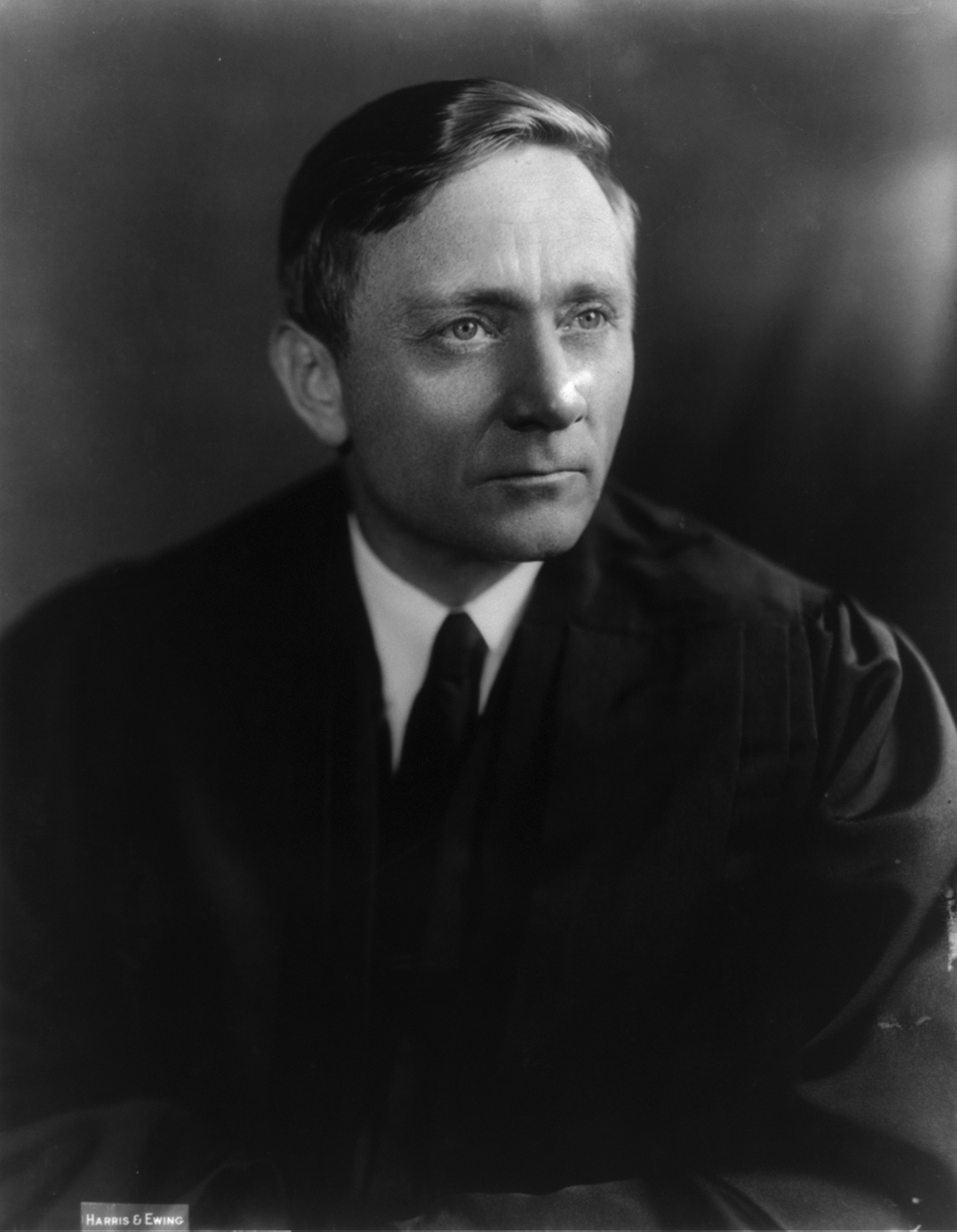
Associate Justice William O. Douglas wrote the opinion of the Court in the Kawakita case.

Tomoya Kawakita, in a photograph taken at his 1948 trial for treason

In a 4–3 decision issued on June 2, 1952, the Supreme Court upheld Kawakita's treason conviction and death sentence. The Court's opinion was written by Associate Justice William O. Douglas, joined by Associate Justices Stanley F. Reed, Robert H. Jackson, and Sherman Minton.

The Court's majority held that the jury in Kawakita's trial had been justified in concluding that he had not lost or given up his U.S. citizenship while he was in Japan during the war. The Court added that an American citizen owed allegiance to the United States, and could be found guilty of treason, no matter where he lived—even for actions committed in another country that also claimed him as a citizen. Further, given the flagrant nature of Kawakita's actions, the majority found that the trial judge had not acted arbitrarily in imposing a death sentence.

=== Dissent ===
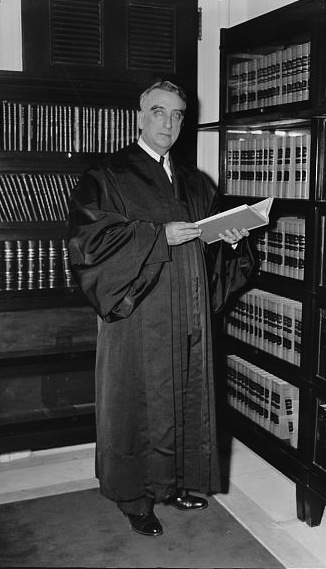
Chief Justice Fred M. Vinson wrote the dissent in the Kawakita case.

Chief Justice Fred M. Vinson authored a dissenting opinion, which was joined by Associate Justices Hugo Black and Harold H. Burton. The dissent concluded that "for over two years, [Kawakita] was consistently demonstrating his allegiance to Japan, not the United States. As a matter of law, he expatriated himself as well as that can be done." On this basis, the dissenting justices would have reversed Kawakita's treason conviction.

== Subsequent developments ==
On October 29, 1953, President Dwight D. Eisenhower, responding to appeals from the Japanese government commuted Kawakita's sentence to life imprisonment plus a $10,000 fine. After the commutation of his sentence, Kawakita was transferred to the Alcatraz Federal Penitentiary. He was transferred to McNeil Island Federal Penitentiary after the closure of Alcatraz in 1963.

Throughout his imprisonment, Kawakita's three sisters lobbied for his release. They said their brother's trial had been unfair and racist. They questioned the fairness of his trial in California, given its horrendous history against Japanese-Americans. The Kennedy administration initially responded in 1963 by refusing to release Kawakita.

Earlier that year, the Attorney General, Robert F. Kennedy had sought the opinions of those who were involved in the case. Mathes was adamantly opposed, but James Carter supported clemency, as did the lower appellate judge who wrote the opinion upholding Kawakita's conviction.

Carter said Kawakita should be released, but exiled. Robert Kennedy forwarded this recommendation to his brother. He acknowledged Kawakita's crimes, but said he had been a model prisoner during his incarceration. The Japan Desk of the Department of State also indicated that releasing Kawakita would boost foreign relations.

On October 24, 1963, President John F. Kennedy—in what would be one of his last official acts before his assassination—ordered Kawakita released from prison on the condition that he leave the United States and be banned from ever returning. Kennedy justified Kawakita's release by saying he had now served more time than any other war criminal in Japan (the last Japanese war criminals serving time in Sugamo Prison were paroled in 1958). Kawakita flew to Japan on December 13, 1963, and reacquired Japanese citizenship upon his arrival. In 1978, Kawakita sought permission to travel to the United States to visit his parents' grave, but his efforts were unsuccessful. For the remainder of his life, he lived quietly with relatives in Tokyo until his death in the mid-1990s.

== See also ==
- List of United States Supreme Court cases, volume 343
- Iva Toguri D'Aquino, a Japanese-American incorrectly identified as "Tokyo Rose" and convicted of treason for alleged actions committed during World War II; she was later pardoned by President Ford
- Kanao Inouye, a Japanese-Canadian convicted of treason and executed for actions committed during World War II
