= Seinendan =

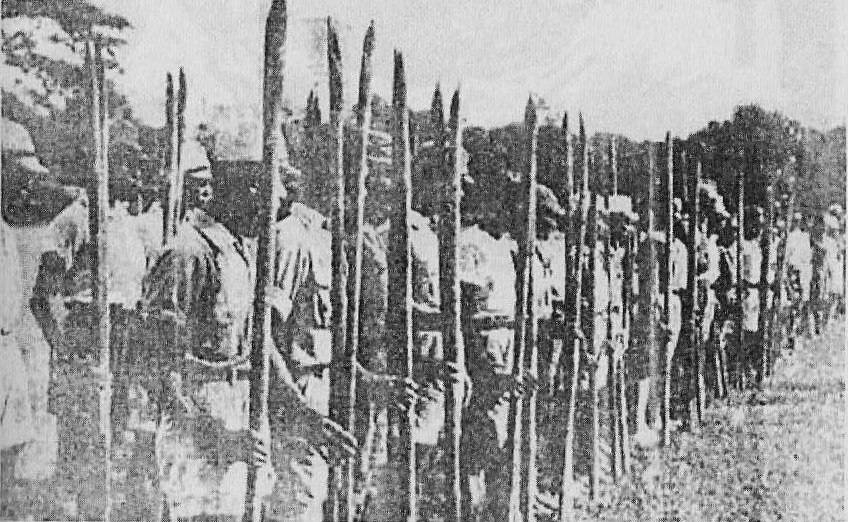
Minangkabau students participating in Seinendan education during the Japanese occupation of West Sumatra

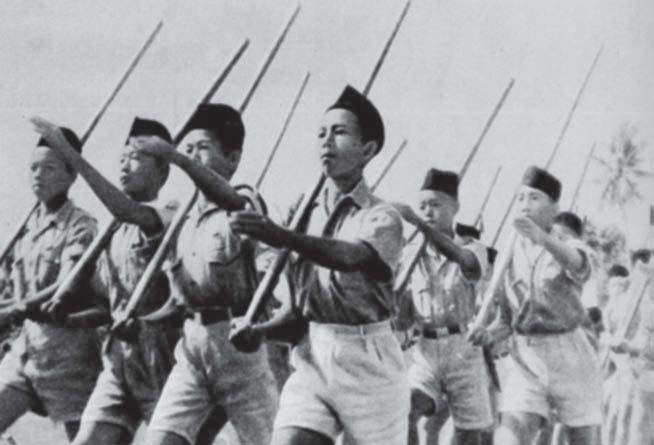
Parade of Seinendan troops carrying sharpened bamboo in front of high-ranking Japanese military officers

Seinendan (青年団, Seinendan; "Youth association") is a type of youth voluntary groups for social contributions in Japan. being derived from traditional local youth groups.

In a narrow sense, the term refers to a youth organization formed on 9 March 1943 by the Imperial Japanese Army in the occupied Dutch East Indies (present-day Indonesia). The purpose of the Seinendan organization was ostensibly to educate and train young people so that they could defend their homeland from imperialism. Its real purpose, however, was to prepare the Indonesian youths to assist the Japanese military against the expected Allied invasion of the Indonesian archipelago. The organization was considered paramilitary in nature and under the leadership of the occupation authorities (Japanese: 軍政官, romanized: Gunseikan). The requirements to become a member proved not too strict and soon there were 35,500 youth members aged 14 to 25 years old from all over Java. This number had grown to about 500,000 youths by the time Japan surrendered.

== See also ==
- Collaboration with the Empire of Japan
- Japanese occupation of the Dutch East Indies
- Keibōdan
