= Mahmud Salman =

Iraqi Air Force officer (1889–1942)

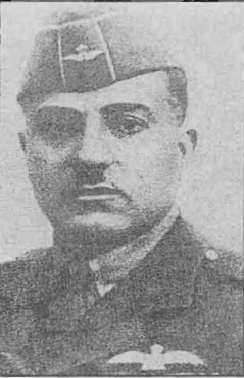
- Born: 7 January 1889; Baghdad, Ottoman Iraq, Ottoman Empire
- Died: 5 May 1942 (aged 53); Baghdad, Kingdom of Iraq
- Cause of death: Execution by hanging
- Military career
- Allegiance: Ottoman Empire (1911–1918); Arab Kingdom of Syria; Kingdom of Iraq (1934–1941)
- Branch: Royal Iraqi Air Force
- Service years: 1911-1941
- Rank: Colonel
- Units: Ottoman Army; Iraqi Army (1922-1931); Iraqi Air Force (1931 - 1941)
- Commands: Chief of the Air Force
- Conflicts: First World War; Franco-Syrian War; Anglo-Iraqi War

Colonel Mahmud Salman (Arabic: محمود سلمان; 7 January 1889 – 5 May 1942) was the Commanding Officer in the Royal Iraqi Air Force in the late 1930s and as a member of the Golden Square, was one of the four principal instigators of the 1941 Iraqi coup d'état. Following the intervention of the British and the suppression of the coup, he was court-martialed and executed for treason.

Salman was born in Baghdad in 1889 and as a young man served as an officer in the Ottoman, Syrian and Iraqi armies, the latter which he joined in 1925. In 1937, following the 1936 Iraqi coup d'état, when Bakr Sidqi became the de-facto ruler of Iraq and Commander of the Armed Forces, Salman was one of the small group of officers who planned the execution of Sidqi.
