= Salah al-Din al-Sabbagh =

Iraqi military officer (1889–1945)

- صلاح الدين الصباغ
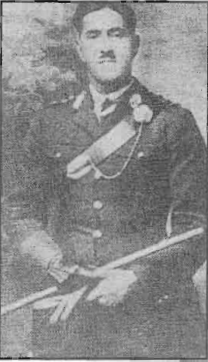
- Born: 1889; Mosul, Ottoman Iraq
- Died: 16 October 1945 (aged 55–56); Baghdad, Kingdom of Iraq
- Cause of death: Execution by hanging
- Military career
- Allegiance: Ottoman Empire (1915–1918); Kingdom of Iraq (1921–1941)
- Service years: 1915–1918, 1921–1941
- Conflicts: First World War; Anglo-Iraqi War (executed)

Salah al-Din al-Sabbagh (Arabic: صلاح الدين الصباغ; 1889 – 16 October 1945) was an Iraqi Army officer and Arab nationalist that led the Golden Square group which had opposed the government at the time and had highly influenced politics between the years of 1939 and 1941.

== Biography ==
Born in Mosul to Iraqi parents, he was educated there and later attended the Ottoman Military College in Istanbul, where he graduated as an officer in 1915.

Sabbagh served in Palestine and Macedonia during World War I where he was imprisoned only to later join Amir Faisal I ibn Hussein, who became king of Iraq, and then returned to Iraq in 1921 to partake in the Iraqi army. His military education extended to courses taken both in Belgium and Britain. In 1924 he became an instructor at the Baghdad Military College where he later taught at the Staff College. Sabbagh was then awarded the position of assistant chief of staff of the Iraqi army in 1937.

He was an Arab nationalist which led him to become the head of the Golden Square between 1939 and 1941, a group of army officers that had placed heavy influence on Iraq's political scene. During this period, and relating to being an army officer and a pan-Arab nationalist, al-Sabbagh supervised the training of al-Futuwwah youth movement. Established in 1935, and made compulsory for high school students in 1939, the futuwwah movement, via its paramilitary training, sought to transform young Iraqi-Arab youth into future soldiers committed to the cultural, historical, geographical and national unity of the Arab nation.

Having admired the Grand Mufti of Jerusalem, Mohammad Amin al-Husayni, he worked both with him and Rashid Ali al-Kaylani to negotiate with the Axis powers for support of their pan-Arab goals. Al-Sabbagh supported Rashid Ali as prime minister in 1941 and was responsible as a major advocate of the Anglo-Iraqi War in April and May. Soon after the Iraqi defeat in the Anglo-Iraqi War of 1941, Sabbagh fled to Iran, then to Turkey. However, in 1945, he was captured by the British, after which he was extradited to Iraq. Sabbagh was court-martialed for treason, sentenced to death, and publicly hanged on 16 October 1945.

Sabbagh had written an autobiography titled "Fursan al-Uruba fi al-Iraq" ("The knights of Arabism in Iraq"), which had been published in Damascus in 1956 which had detailed the account of his pan-Arabism.
