= Royal Air Force =

Air and space warfare force of the United Kingdom

- Badge of the RAF ; Logo of the RAF
- Founded: 1 April 1918; 108 years ago
- Country: United Kingdom
- Type: Air and space force
- Role: Aerial and space warfare
- Size: 31,080 active personnel; 3,070 reserve personnel (Note: Since April 2013, MoD publications no longer report the entire strength of the Regular Reserve, instead, only Regular Reserves serving under a fixed-term reserve contract are counted. These contracts are similar in nature to the Royal Auxiliary Air Force.); 1,470 other personnel; 670 aircraft
- Part of: British Armed Forces
- Air Staff Offices: Whitehall, London
- Mottos: "Per Ardua ad Astra" (Latin) (Through Adversity to the Stars)
- Colours: Air force blue and gold
- March: Quick: "Royal Air Force March Past"; Slow: "Saeculum"
- Anniversaries: 1 April
- Engagements: See list: First World War; Third Anglo-Afghan War; Somaliland Campaign; Iraqi Revolt; Pink's War; Arab revolt in Palestine; Second World War; Palestine Emergency; Indonesian National Revolution; Afghan revolt; 1948 Arab–Israeli War; Berlin Blockade (Operation Vittles); Malayan Emergency; Korean War; Cyprus Emergency; Mau Mau Rebellion (Operation Anvil); Suez Crisis (Operation Musketeer); Cuban Missile Crisis; Indonesia–Malaysia confrontation (Operation Claret); Aden Emergency; Dhofar Rebellion; Northern Ireland (Operation Banner); Turkish invasion of Cyprus; Falklands War (Operation Corporate); Gulf War (Operation Granby); Bosnian War; Kosovo War (Operation Engadine); War in Afghanistan (Operation Herrick and Operation Toral); Global War on Terrorism; 2003 Invasion of Iraq (Operation Telic); 2011 military intervention in Libya (Operation Ellamy); War against the Islamic State (Operation Shader); Operation Serval; Operation Newcombe; Operation Prosperity Guardian; Operation Poseidon Archer
- Website: www.raf.mod.uk

Commanders
- Head of the Armed Forces: King Charles III
- Secretary of State for Defence: Wes Streeting MP
- Chief of the Air Staff: Air Chief Marshal Sir Harvey Smyth
- Deputy Chief of the Air Staff: Air Marshal Paul Lloyd
- Air and Space Commander: Air Marshal Mark Flewin

Insignia
- Roundel

- Fin flash

- Ensign

- King's Colour

Aircraft flown
- Attack: Protector RG1
- Electronic warfare: StormShroud
- Fighter: Typhoon FGR4; F-35 Lightning II
- Helicopter: Chinook HC5/6/6A
- Trainer helicopter: Juno HT1; Jupiter HT1
- Patrol: Poseidon MRA1
- Reconnaissance: Airseeker R1; Shadow R1/1A
- Trainer: Hawk T1/2; Texan T1; Phenom T1; Typhoon T3; Viking T1; Prefect T1; Tutor T1
- Transport: Voyager KC2/3; Atlas C1; C-17 Globemaster; Envoy IV CC1
- Tanker: Voyager KC2/3

The Royal Air Force (RAF) is the air and space force of the United Kingdom, British Overseas Territories and Crown Dependencies. It was formed towards the end of the First World War on 1 April 1918 through the merger of the Royal Flying Corps (RFC) and the Royal Naval Air Service (RNAS). Following the Allied victory over the Central Powers in 1918, they emerged as the largest air force in the world. Since its formation, they have played a significant role in British military history. In particular, during the Second World War, they defeated the German Luftwaffe's efforts to establish air superiority over Great Britain during the Battle of Britain, and played a key role in the Combined Bomber Offensive alongside the USAAF.

The RAF's mission is to support the objectives of the British Ministry of Defence (MOD), which are to "provide the capabilities needed to ensure the security and defence of the United Kingdom and overseas territories, including against terrorism; to support the Government's foreign policy objectives particularly in promoting international peace and security". Its mission statement as "... [to provide] an agile, adaptable and capable Air Force that, person for person, is second to none, and that makes a decisive air power contribution in support of the UK Defence Mission". The mission statement is supported by the RAF's definition of air power, which guides its strategy. Air power is defined as "the ability to project power from the air and space to influence the behaviour of people or the course of events".

Today, the Royal Air Force maintains an operational fleet of various types of aircraft, described as being "leading-edge" in terms of technology. This largely consists of fixed-wing aircraft, including those in the following roles: fighter and strike, airborne early warning and control, intelligence, surveillance, target acquisition, and reconnaissance (ISTAR), signals intelligence (SIGINT), maritime patrol, air-to-air refueling (AAR) and strategic & tactical transport. The majority of their rotary-wing aircraft form part of the tri-service Joint Aviation Command in support of ground forces. Most of their aircraft and personnel are based in the UK, with many others serving on global operations (principally over Iraq and Syria) or at long-established overseas bases (Ascension Island, Cyprus, Gibraltar, and the Falkland Islands). Although they are the principal British air power arm, the Royal Navy's Fleet Air Arm and the British Army's Army Air Corps also operate armed aircraft.

== History ==
Air Force (Constitution) Act 1917 (Note: Section 15.)
- Act of Parliament
- Parliament of the United Kingdom
- Long title: An Act to make provision for the establishment, administration, and discipline of an Air Force, the establishment of an Air Council, and for purposes connected therewith.
- Citation: 7 & 8 Geo. 5. c. 51
- Territorial extent: United Kingdom

Dates
- Royal assent: 29 November 1917
- Commencement: 29 November 1917 (Note: The Acts of Parliament (Commencement) Act 1793.)
Other legislation
Amended by	Statute Law Revision Act 1927; Air Force Reserve Act 1950; Auxiliary Forces Act 1953; Law Reform (Limitation of Actions, etc.) Act 1954; Revision of the Army and Air Force Acts (Transitional Provisions) Act 1955; Naval Discipline Act 1957; Defence (Transfer of Functions) Act 1964; Statute Law (Repeals) Act 1976; Armed Forces Act 1981; Armed Forces Act 2006

Status: Amended

Text of statute as originally enacted

Text of the Air Force (Constitution) Act 1917 as in force today (including any amendments) within the United Kingdom, from legislation.gov.uk.

=== Origins ===
The Royal Air Force was formed towards the end of the First World War on 1 April 1918 by merging the Royal Flying Corps (RFC) and the Royal Naval Air Service (RNAS). This made it the second independent air force in the world, after only the Finnish Air Force (established 6 March 1918).

The merger was initially recommended by a report issued on 17 August 1917 by the South African statesman and general Jan Smuts, with significant contributions from Lieutenant General David Henderson. The Smuts Report informed the creation of the Air Force (Constitution) Bill, which made provision for the creation of an independent Air Force. This was passed by Parliament on 23 November 1917, and received royal assent as the Air Force (Constitution) Act 1917 (7 & 8 Geo. 5. c. 51) on 29 November 1917. On 7 March 1918, King George V issued a royal decree naming the new service the 'Royal Air Force'. At the time of its formation, it was the largest air force in the world. Its first headquarters were the former Hotel Cecil on the Strand in London.

After the war, their size was drastically cut, and its inter-war years were relatively quiet. They were put in charge of British military activity in Iraq, and carried out minor actions in other parts of the British Empire, including establishing bases to protect Singapore and Malaya. Their naval aviation branch, the Fleet Air Arm, was founded in 1924 but handed over to Admiralty control on 24 May 1939. In 1925, they carried out their first independent operation, conducting a successful air campaign against rebelling Mahsud tribesmen during Pink's War.

It was among the earliest and keenest advocates of the doctrine of strategic bombing, informed by Britain's experience of German air attacks in the First World War. Starting in the early 1920s, strategic bombing saw significant technical and tactical development in the RAF, and ultimately became Britain's main offensive airpower strategy during the Second World War.

=== Second World War ===
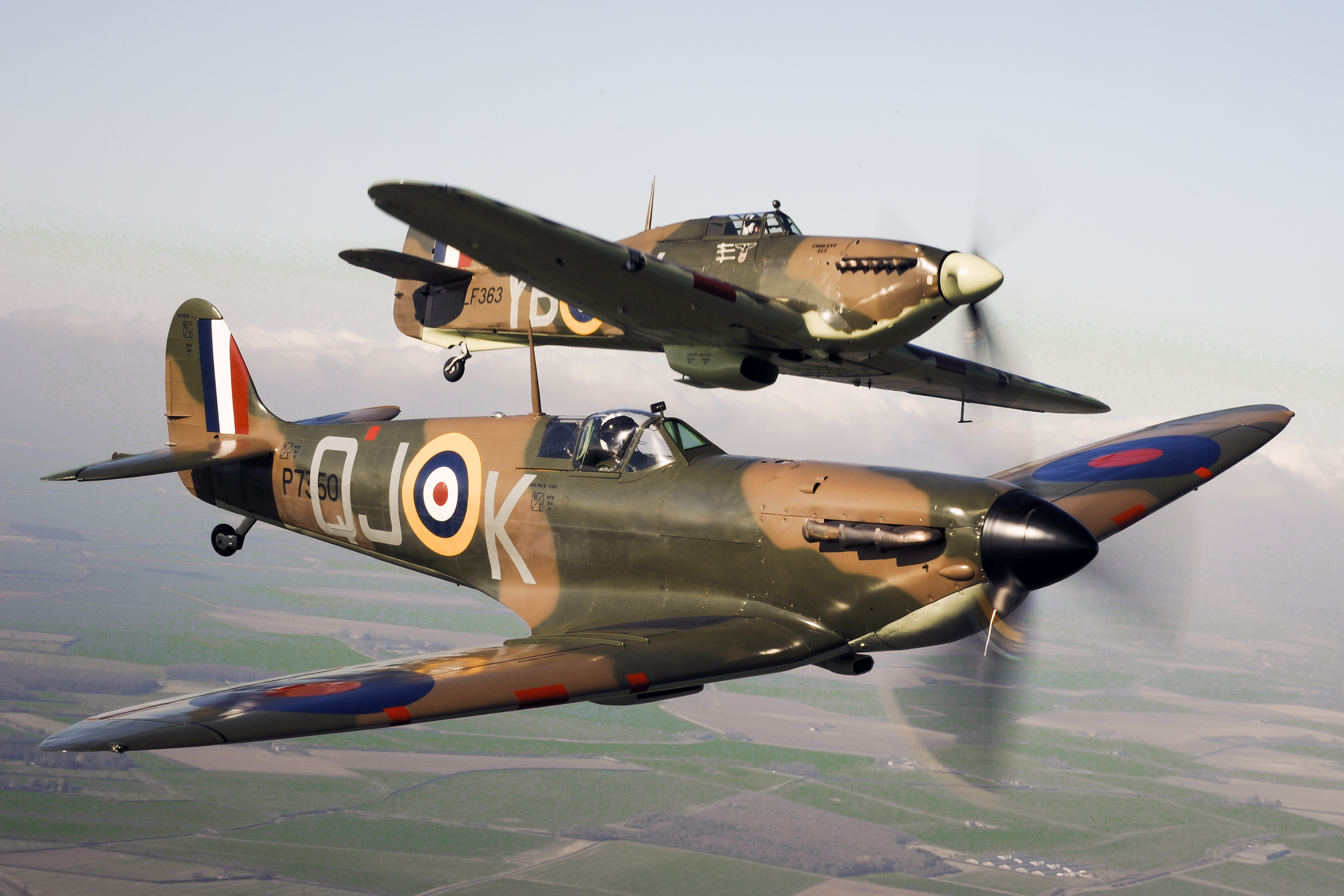
A Spitfire and Hurricane, which both played major roles in the Battle of Britain.

The Royal Air Force underwent rapid expansion prior to and during the Second World War. Under the British Commonwealth Air Training Plan of December 1939, the air forces of British Commonwealth countries trained and formed "Article XV squadrons" for service with its formations. Many individual personnel from these countries, and exiles from occupied Europe, also served with their squadrons. By the end of the war the Royal Canadian Air Force had contributed more than 30 squadrons to serve in its formations, similarly, approximately a quarter of Bomber Command's personnel were Canadian. Additionally, the Royal Australian Air Force represented around nine per cent of their personnel who served in the European and Mediterranean theatres.

During the Battle of Britain in 1940, the organization defended the skies over Britain against the numerically superior German Luftwaffe. In what is perhaps the most prolonged and complicated air campaign in history, the Battle of Britain contributed significantly to the delay and subsequent indefinite postponement of Operation Sea Lion, Hitler's plans for an invasion of the UK. In the House of Commons on 20 August, prompted by their ongoing efforts, Prime Minister Winston Churchill made a speech to the nation, where he said "Never in the field of human conflict was so much owed by so many to so few".

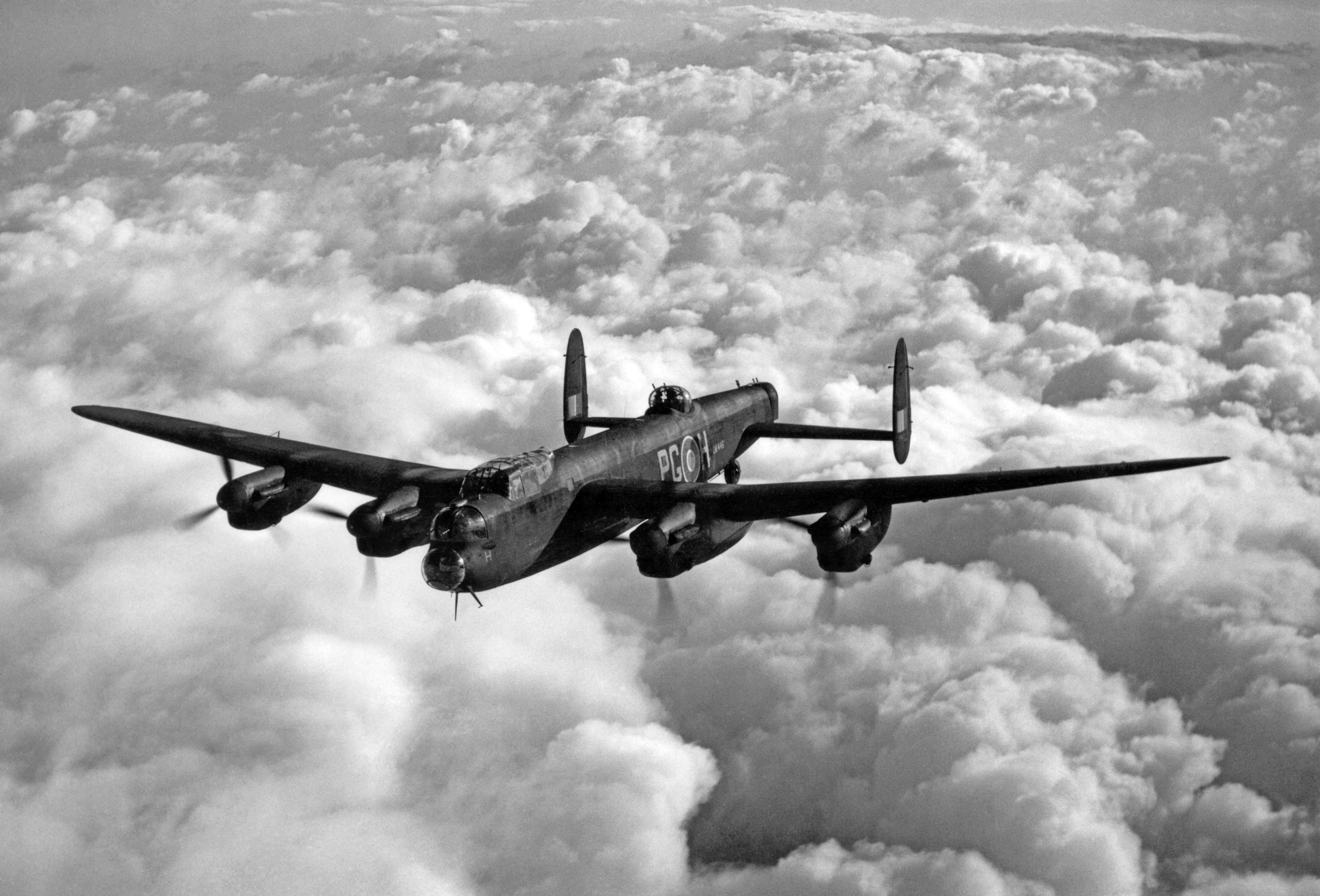
The Avro Lancaster heavy bomber was extensively used during the strategic bombing of Germany.

The largest effort during the war was the strategic bombing campaign against Germany by Bomber Command. While their bombing of Germany began almost immediately upon the outbreak of war at first it was ineffectual; it was only later, particularly under the leadership of Air Chief Marshal Harris, that these attacks became increasingly devastating, from early 1943 onward, as new technology and greater numbers of superior aircraft became available. They adopted night-time area bombing on German cities such as Hamburg and Dresden. Night time area bombing constituted the great bulk of their bombing campaign, mainly due to Harris, but it also developed precision bombing techniques for specific operations, such as the infamous "Dambusters" raid by No. 617 Squadron, or the Amiens prison raid known as Operation Jericho.

=== Cold War era ===
Following victory in the Second World War, the RAF underwent significant re-organisation, as technological advances in air warfare saw the arrival of jet fighters and bombers. During the early stages of the Cold War, one of the first major operations undertaken by the RAF was the Berlin Airlift, codenamed Operation Plainfire. Between 26 June 1948 and the lifting of the Soviet blockade of the city on 12 May 1949, the RAF provided 17% of the total supplies delivered, using Avro Yorks, Douglas Dakotas flying to Gatow Airport and Short Sunderlands flying to Lake Havel. the RAF saw its first post-war engagements in the 1948 Arab–Israeli War: during the withdrawal of the former Mandatory Palestine in May 1948 where British Supermarine Spitfire FR.18s shot down four Royal Egyptian Air Force Spitfire LF.9s after the REAF mistakenly attacked RAF Ramat David airbase; and during encounters with the Israeli Air Force which saw the loss of a single de Havilland Mosquito PR.34 in November 1948 and four Spitfire FR.18s and a single Hawker Tempest F.6 in January 1949.

Before Britain developed its own nuclear weapons, the RAF were provided with American nuclear weapons under Project E. However, following the development of its own arsenal, the British Government elected on 16 February 1960 to share the country's nuclear deterrent between the RAF and submarines of the Royal Navy, first deciding to concentrate solely on the air force's V bomber fleet. These were initially armed with nuclear gravity bombs, later being equipped with the Blue Steel missile. Following the development of the Royal Navy's Polaris submarines, the strategic nuclear deterrent passed to the navy's submarines on 30 June 1969. With the introduction of Polaris, the RAF's strategic nuclear role was reduced to a tactical one, using WE.177 gravity bombs. This tactical role was continued by the V bombers into the 1980s and until 1998 by the Panavia Tornado GR1.

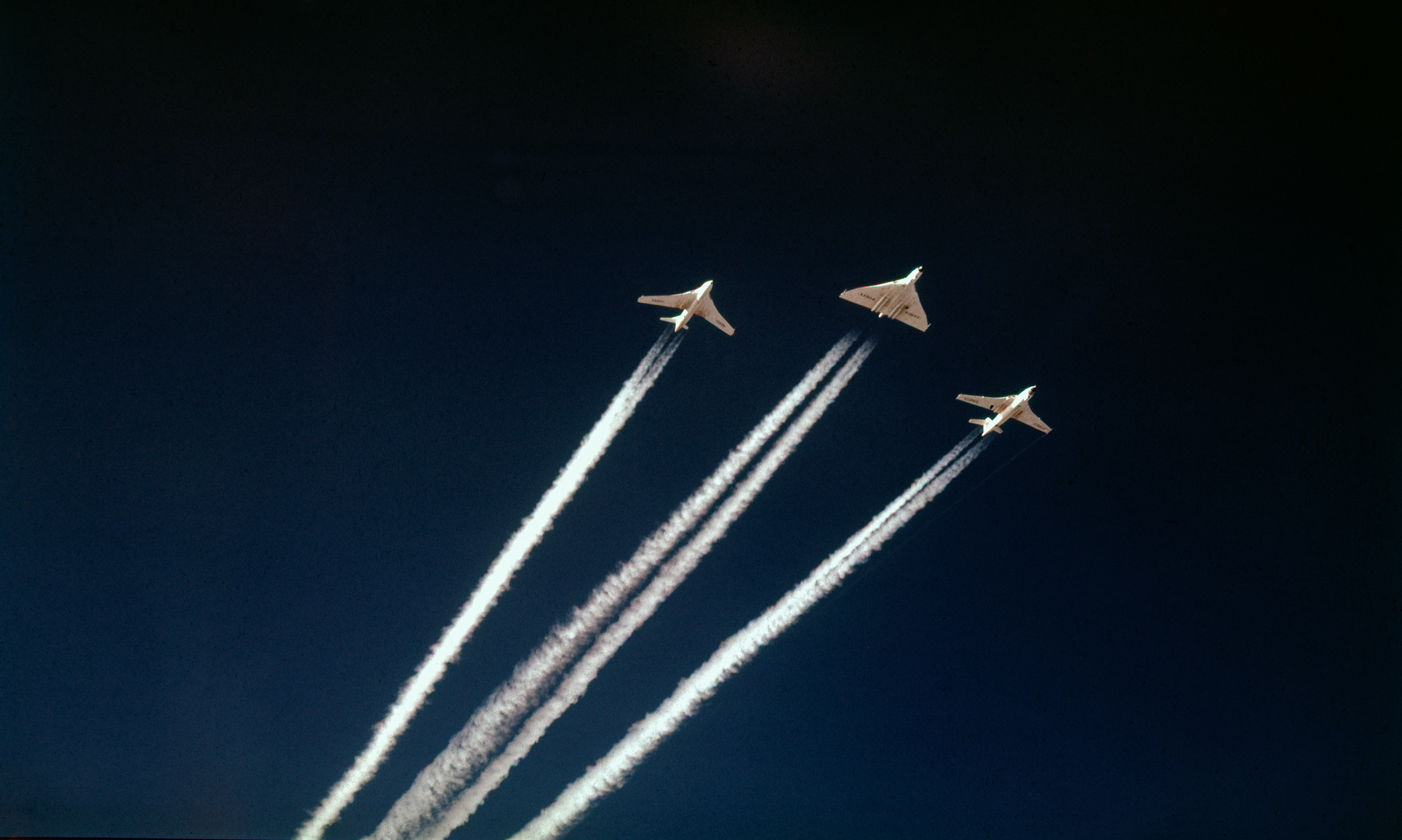
The V bomber force was used to carry both conventional and nuclear bombs.

For much of the Cold War the primary role of the RAF was the defence of Western Europe against potential attack by the Soviet Union, with many squadrons based in West Germany. The main bases were RAF Brüggen, RAF Gütersloh, RAF Laarbruch and RAF Wildenrath – the only air defence base. With the decline of the British Empire, global operations were scaled back, and Far East Air Force was disbanded on 31 October 1971. Despite this, the RAF fought in many battles in the Cold War period. Operations continued for the next 12 years until 1960 with aircraft flying out of RAF Tengah and RAF Butterworth. The RAF played a minor role in the Korean War, with flying boats taking part. From 1953 to 1956 the Avro Lincoln squadrons carried out anti-Mau Mau operations in Kenya using its base at RAF Eastleigh. The Suez Crisis in 1956 saw a large role, with aircraft operating from RAF Akrotiri and RAF Nicosia on Cyprus and RAF Luqa and RAF Hal Far on Malta as part of Operation Musketeer. The RAF suffered its most recent loss to an enemy aircraft during the Suez Crisis, when an English Electric Canberra PR7 was shot down over Syria.

In 1957, the RAF participated heavily during the Jebel Akhdar War in Oman, operating both de Havilland Venom and Avro Shackleton aircraft. The RAF made 1,635 raids, dropping 1,094 tons and firing 900 rockets at the interior of Oman between July and December 1958, targeting insurgents, mountain top villages and water channels in a war that remained under low profile. The Konfrontasi against Indonesia in the early 1960s did see use of their aircraft, but due to a combination of deft diplomacy and selective ignoring of certain events by both sides, it never developed into a full-scale war. The RAF played a large role in the Aden Emergency between 1963 and 1967. Hawker Hunter FGA.9s based at RAF Khormaksar, Aden, were regularly called in by the British Army as close air support to carry out strikes on rebel positions. The Radfan Campaign (Operation Nutcracker) in early 1964 was successful in suppressing the revolt in Radfa; however, it did nothing to end the insurgency with the British withdrawing from Aden in November 1967.

One of the largest actions undertaken by the RAF during the Cold War was the air campaign during the 1982 Falklands War, in which the RAF operated alongside the Fleet Air Arm. During the war, aircraft were deployed in the mid-Atlantic at RAF Ascension Island and a detachment from No. 1 Squadron was deployed with the Royal Navy, operating from the aircraft carrier HMS Hermes. Pilots also flew missions using the Royal Navy's Sea Harriers in the air-to-air combat role, in particular Flight Lieutenant Dave Morgan the highest scoring pilot of the war. Following a British victory, the RAF remained in the South Atlantic to provide air defence to the Falkland Islands, with the McDonnell Douglas Phantom FGR2 based at RAF Mount Pleasant which was built in 1984.

=== Post-Cold War ===
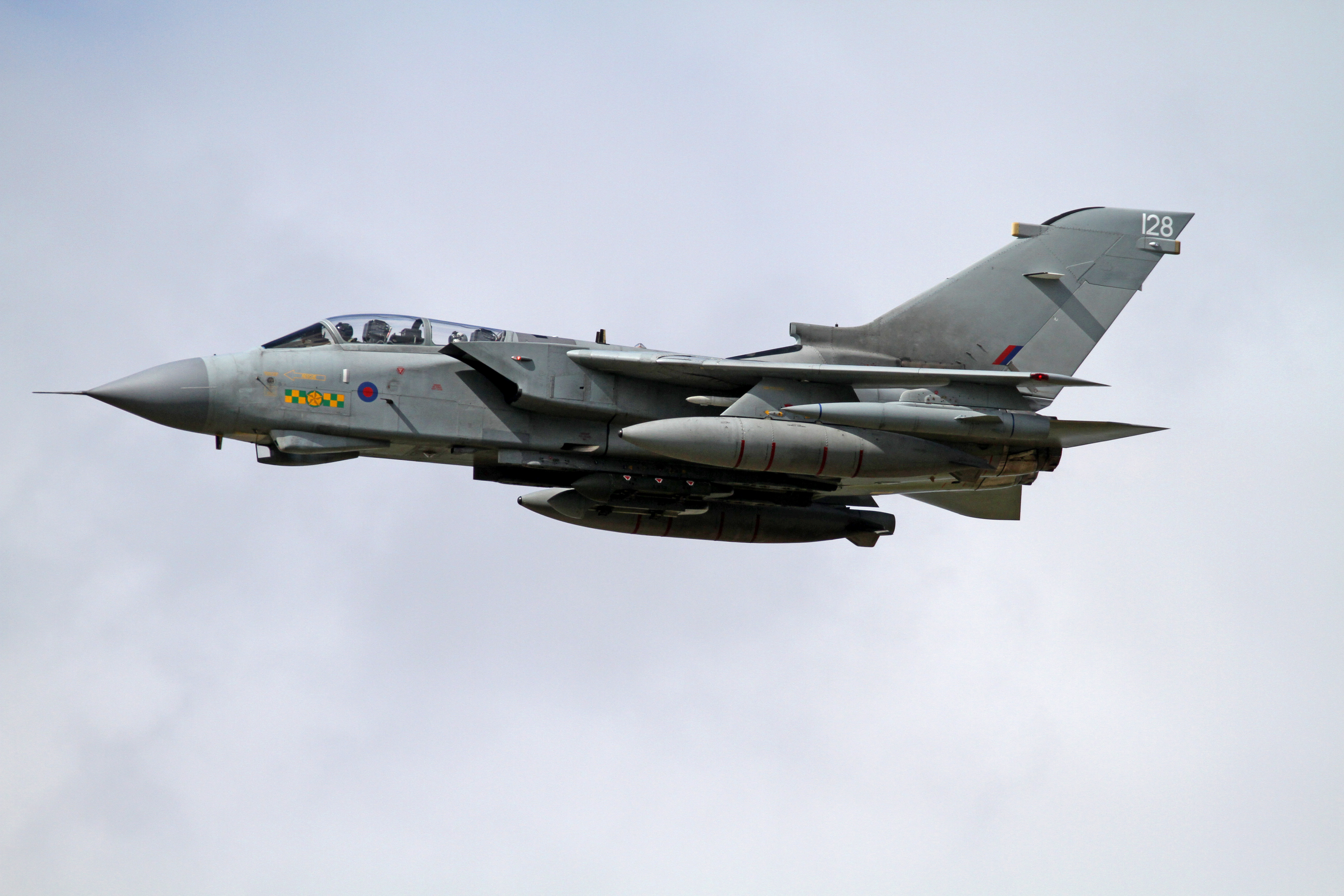
The Tornado played an integral part in operations from 1991 until its retirement in 2019

With the end of the Cold War and the collapse of the Soviet Union, their focus returned to expeditionary air power. Since 1990, the RAF has been involved in several large-scale operations, including the 1991 Gulf War, the 1999 Kosovo War, the 2001 War in Afghanistan, the 2003 invasion and war in Iraq, the 2011 intervention in Libya and from 2014 onwards has been involved in the war against the Islamic State.

The RAF began conducting Remotely-piloted Air System (RPAS) operations in 2004, with No. 1115 Flight carrying out missions in Afghanistan and Iraq with the General Atomics MQ-1 Predator. Initially embedded with the United States Air Force, they formed their own RPAS squadron in 2007 when No. 39 Squadron was stood up as a General Atomics MQ-9A Reaper unit at Creech AFB, Nevada.

The RAF's 90th anniversary was commemorated on 1 April 2008 by a flypast of the their Aerobatic Display Team the Red Arrows and four Eurofighter Typhoons along the River Thames, in a straight line from just south of London City Airport Tower Bridge, the London Eye, the RAF Memorial and (at 13.00) the Ministry of Defence building.

Four major defence reviews have been conducted since the end of the Cold War: the 1990 Options for Change, the 1998 Strategic Defence Review, the 2003 Delivering Security in a Changing World and the 2010 Strategic Defence and Security Review (SDSR). All four defence reviews have resulted in steady reductions in manpower and numbers of aircraft, especially combat aircraft such as fast-jets. Other reductions saw total manpower reduced by 5,000 personnel to a trained strength of 33,000 and the early retirement of the Joint Force Harrier aircraft, the BAE Harrier GR7/GR9.

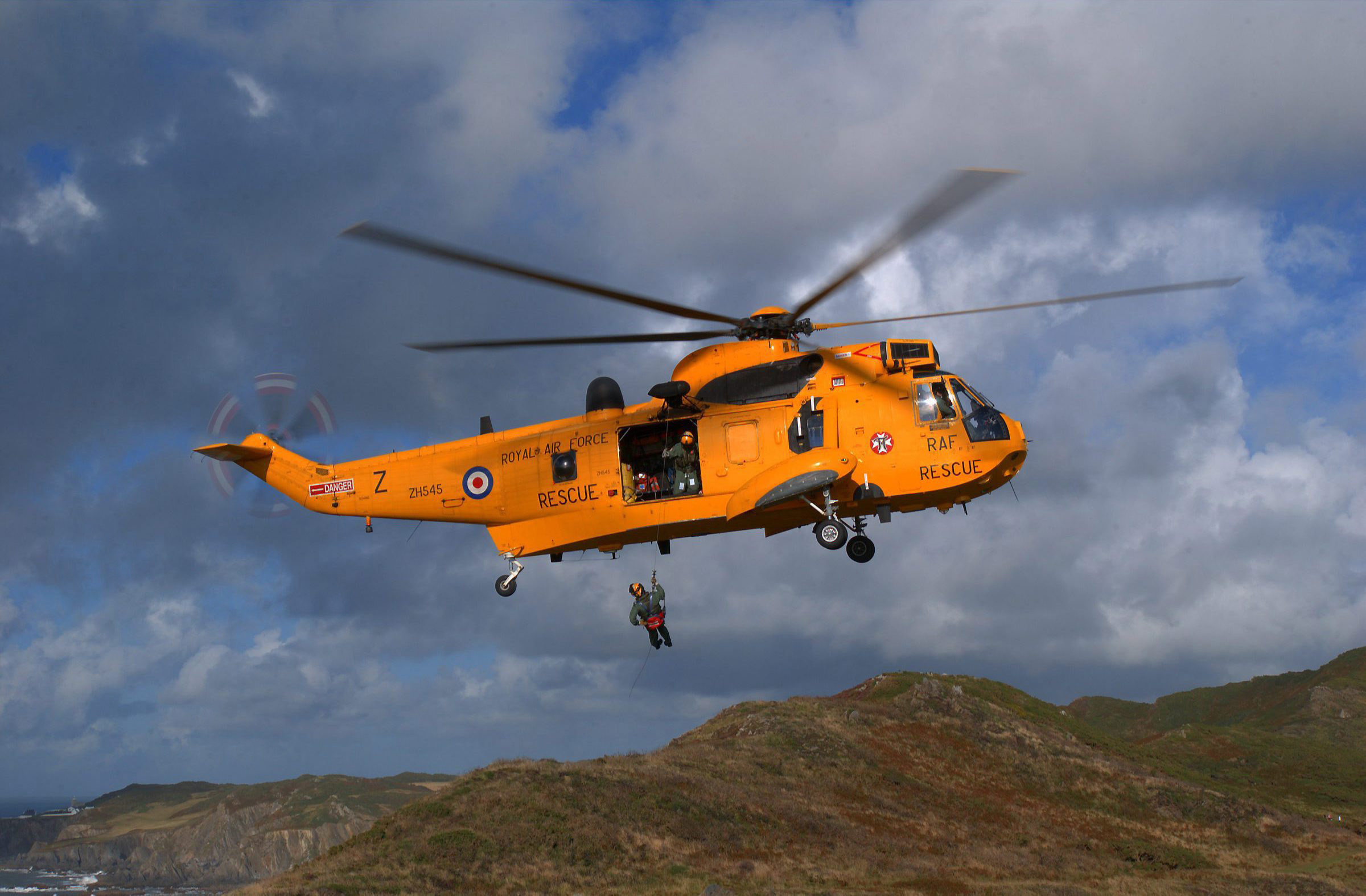
The Sea King in the SAR role from 1978 until 2015 when RAF Search and Rescue was disbanded.

In recent years, fighter aircraft on Quick Reaction Alert have been increasingly required to scramble in response to Russian Air Force aircraft approaching British airspace. On 24 January 2014, in the Houses of Parliament, Conservative MP and Minister of State for the Armed Forces, Andrew Robathan, announced that the RAF had been scrambled almost thirty times in the last three years: eleven times during 2010, ten times during 2011 and eight times during 2012. RAF Coningsby in Lincolnshire and RAF Lossiemouth in Moray both provide Quick reaction alert aircraft, and scramble their Typhoons within minutes to meet or intercept aircraft which give cause for concern. Lossiemouth generally covers the northern sector of UK airspace, while Coningsby covers the southern sector. Typhoon pilot Flight Lieutenant Noel Rees describes how QRA duty works. "At the start of the scaled QRA response, civilian air traffic controllers might see on their screens an aircraft behaving erratically, not responding to their radio calls, or note that it's transmitting a distress signal through its transponder. Rather than scramble Typhoons at the first hint of something abnormal, a controller has the option to put them on a higher level of alert, 'a call to cockpit'. In this scenario the pilot races to the hardened aircraft shelter and does everything short of starting his engines".

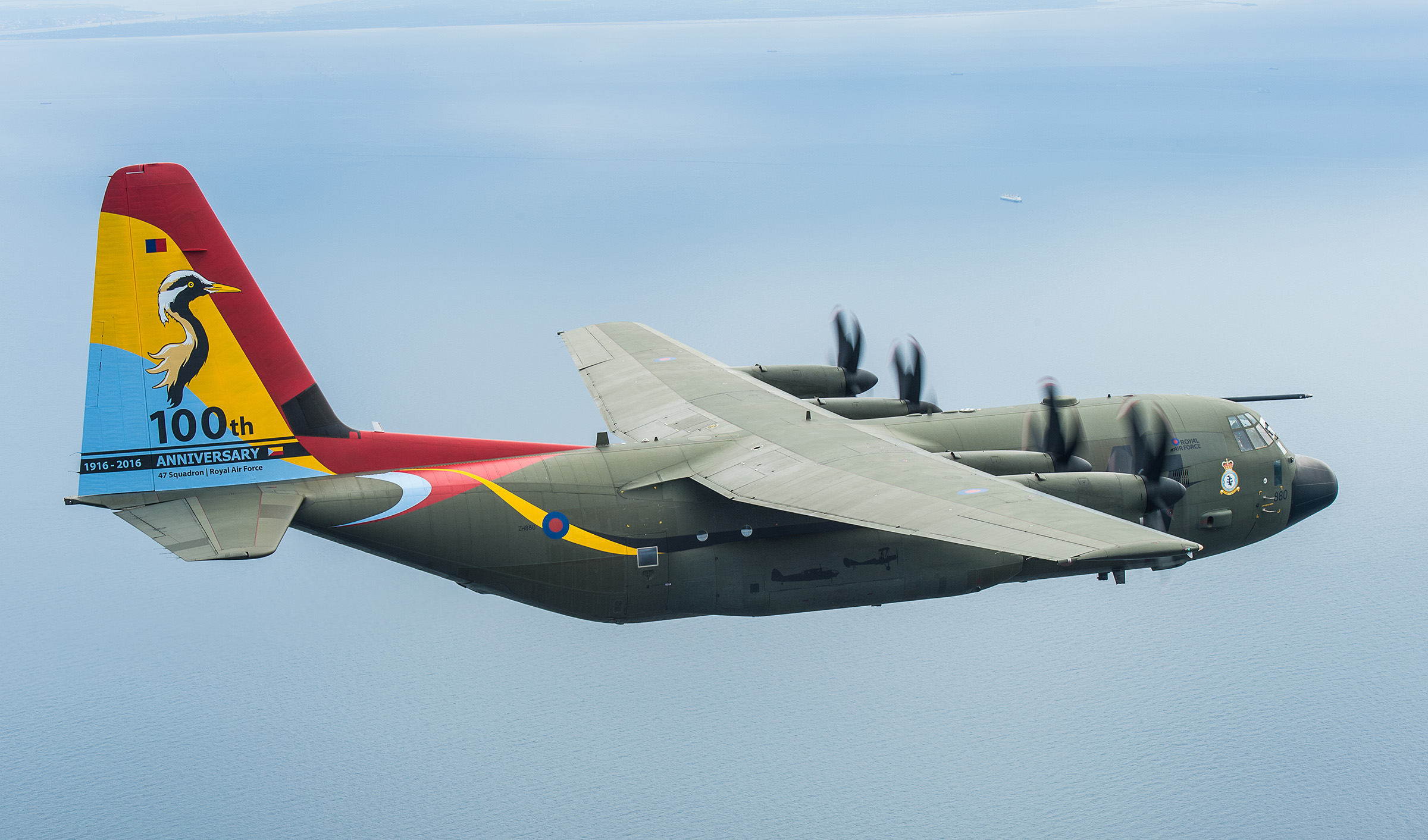
Hercules in operation since 1967. The C-130J model was in service between 1998 and 2023

On 4 October 2015, a final stand-down saw the end of more than 70 years of Search and Rescue provision in the UK. Royal Air Force and Royal Navy's Westland Sea King fleets, after more than 30 years of service, were retired. A civilian contractor, Bristow Helicopters, took over responsibility for UK Search and Rescue, under a Private Finance Initiative with newly purchased Sikorsky S-92 and AgustaWestland AW189 aircraft. The new contract means that all UK SAR coverage is now provided by Bristow aircraft.

In 2018, the RAF's vision of a future constellation of imagery satellites was initiated through the launch of the Carbonite-2 technology demonstrator. The 100 kg Carbonite-2 uses commercial off-the-shelf (COTS) components to deliver high-quality imagery and 3D video footage from space. The Royal Air Force celebrated its 100th anniversary on 1 April 2018. It marked the occasion on 10 July 2018 with a flypast over London consisting of 103 aircraft.

Between March 2020 and 2022, the RAF assisted with the response efforts to the COVID-19 pandemic in the United Kingdom as part of Operation Rescript. This saw the service provide repatriation flights and aeromedical evacuations of COVID-19 patients, drivers and call-handlers to support ambulance services and medics to assist with the staffing of hospitals, testing units and vaccination centres. Under Operation Broadshare, they have also been involved with COVID-19 relief operations overseas, repatriating stranded nationals and delivering medical supplies and vaccines to British Overseas Territories and military installations.

The UK's 20-year long operations in Afghanistan came to an end in August 2021, seeing the largest airlift since the Berlin Blockade take place. As part of Operation Pitting, the RAF helped evacuate more than 15,000 people in two weeks. Between April and May 2023, the RAF helped evacuate more than 2,300 people from Sudan due to the 2023 Sudan conflict as part of Operation Polarbear.

In April 2024, Typhoon FGR4s operating from Akrotiri, Cyprus, engaged and destroyed Iranian drones over Iraqi and Syrian airspace during Iran's strikes against Israel.

On 26 and 27 March 2025, Puma helicopters marked their retirement from service with a flypast of locations with a historical link to Puma including Odiham, Andover, Middle Wallop Flying Station, MOD Boscombe Down, Thiepval Barracks, PJHQ, RAF Halton, RAF High Wycombe, RAF Benson, RAF Cosford, RAF Shawbury as well as other places across the UK.

In June 2025, pro-Palestinian activists broke into Brize Norton Royal Air Force base in Oxfordshire, vandalising and tampering with aircraft. Such actions constitute a national security risk. The ensuing arrests garnered media attention, and the group Palestine Action, which claimed responsibility for the break-in, was later proscribed as a terrorist organisation by the UK government. In addition, a decision was made to begin a 'security review' of military bases across the United Kingdom.

During the 2026 Iran war, the RAF flew sorties in defence of British allies, including Cyprus and other Middle Eastern allies. This operation marked its first use of the F-35B to shoot-down drones in combat. The UK-Qatar joint Typhoon squadron was also involved in these sorties. Its Regiment gunners also operated ground-based air defence against Iranian drones.

On 9 May 2026, a specialist UK military team executed a first-of-its-kind emergency humanitarian mission, parachuting onto Tristan da Cunha to treat a British national with suspected hantavirus. A local island resident who disembarked from the virus-hit cruise ship MV Hondius. Oxygen supplies at the island's hospital had reached a critical level. The territory normally operates with just a two-person medical team. Six paratroopers and two military clinicians from the 16 Air Assault Brigade launched the mission. Because of the specialised medical care required, an intensive care nurse and an intensive care doctor were strapped to paratroopers for tandem jumps. The team flew 6,788 km from RAF Brize Norton to Ascension Island. The RAF then flew more than 3,000 km to the drop zone, supported by mid-air refuelling from an Voyager. Medics battled winds exceeding 25 mph to land safely on the island's rocky golf course. Simultaneously, an A400M aircraft air-dropped 3.3 tonnes of vital medical aid and oxygen.

== Structure ==
=== Senior leadership ===
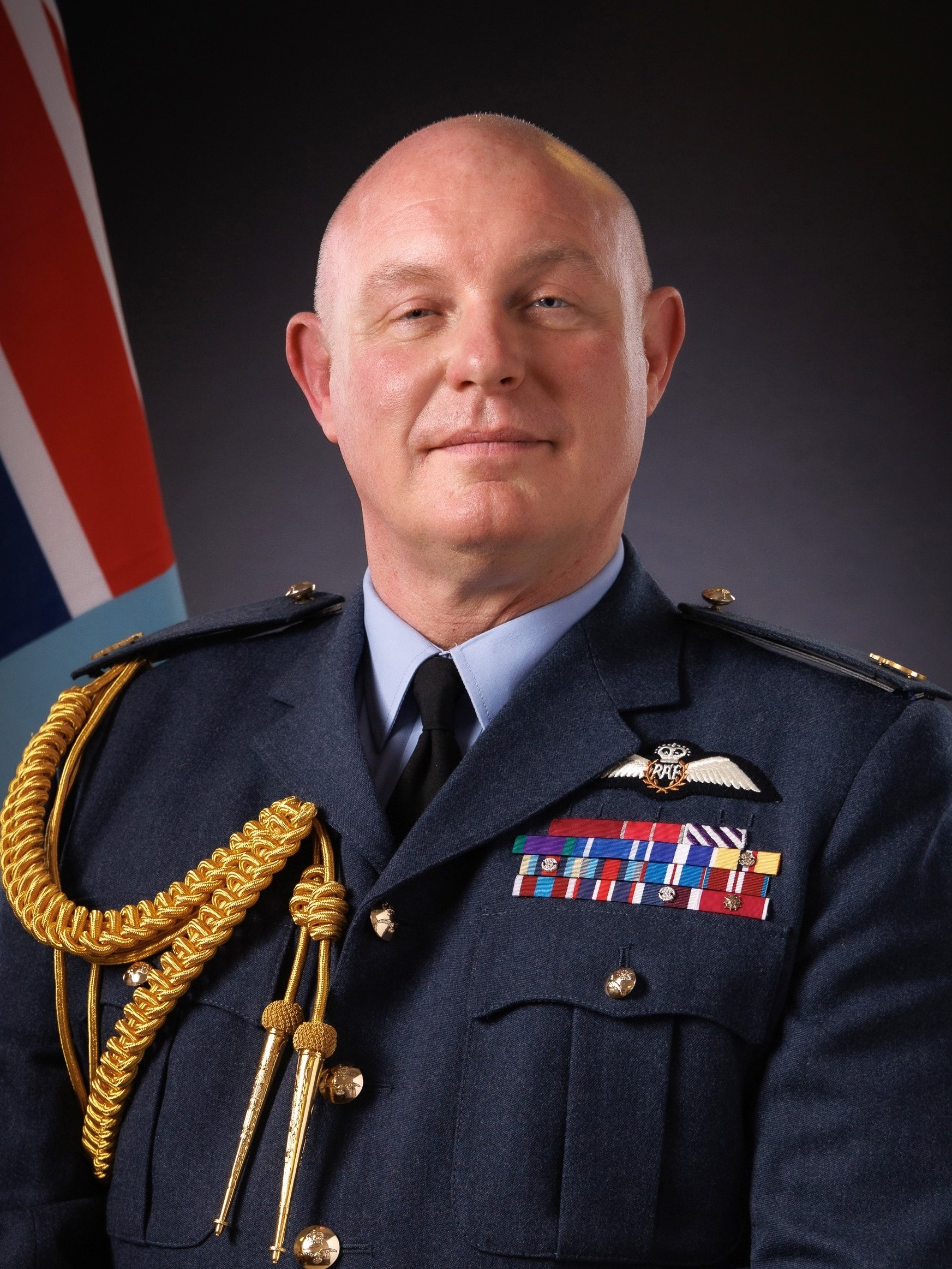
Chief of the Air Staff, Air Chief Marshal Sir Harvey Smyth

The professional head and highest-ranking officer of the Royal Air Force is the Chief of the Air Staff. He reports to the Chief of the Defence Staff, who is the professional head of the British Armed Forces. The incumbent Chief of the Air Staff is Air Chief Marshal Sir Harvey Smyth who was appointed in 2025.

The management of the RAF is the responsibility of the Air Force Board, a sub-committee of the Defence Council which is part of the Ministry of Defence and the body legally responsible for the defence of the United Kingdom and its overseas territories. The Chief of the Air Staff chairs the Air Force Board Standing Committee which decides on the policy and actions required for it to meet the requirements of the Defence Council and His Majesty's Government.

The Chief of the Air Staff is supported by several other senior commanders:

Royal Air Force senior management positions
Title	Rank	NATO rank scale
Chief of the Air Staff	Air Chief Marshal	OF-9
Air and Space Commander	Air Marshal	OF-8
Deputy Chief of the Air Staff	Air Marshal	OF-8
Air Officer Northern Ireland	Air Marshal	OF-8
Assistant Chief of the Air Staff	Air Vice-Marshal	OF-7
Director People	Air Vice-Marshal	OF-7
Director Digital	Civilian	
Director of Resources	Civilian	
Director of Legal Services	Air Vice-Marshal	OF-7
Air Officer Scotland	Air Commodore	OF-6
Air Officer Wales	Air Commodore	OF-6
Chaplain-in-Chief	Revd (Air Vice-Marshal)	OF-7
Warrant Officer of the Royal Air Force	Warrant Officer	OR-9
Non-Executive Directors	Civilian (x5)	

=== Air Command ===
Administrative and operational command of the RAF is delegated by the Air Force Board to Headquarters Air Command, based at RAF High Wycombe in Buckinghamshire. Air Command was formed on 1 April 2007 by combining Strike Command and Personnel and Training Command, resulting in a single command covering the whole itself, led by the chief of the air staff. Through its subordinate groups, Air Command oversees the whole spectrum of its aircraft and operations.

United Kingdom Space Command (UKSC), established 1 April 2021 under the command of Air Vice-Marshal Paul Godfrey is a joint command, but sits "under the Royal Air Force." Godfrey is of equal rank to the commanders of 1, 2, 11, and 22 Groups. The new command has "responsibility for not just operations, but also generating, training and growing the force, and also owning the money and putting all the programmatic rigour into delivering new ..capabilities." UKSC headquarters is at RAF High Wycombe co-located with Air Command.

=== Groups ===
Groups are the subdivisions of operational commands and are responsible for certain types of capabilities or for operations in limited geographical areas. There are five groups subordinate to Air Command, of which four are functional and one is geographically focused:

==== No. 1 Group (Air Combat) ====
No. 1 Group is responsible for its combat aircraft (consisting of the Lightning Force and Typhoon Force) and its intelligence, surveillance, target acquisition, and reconnaissance (ISTAR) capabilities. It oversees stations at its Coningsby and Waddington in Lincolnshire, Lossiemouth in Moray and Marham in Norfolk. The group's Eurofighter Typhoon FGR4 aircraft protect UK and NATO airspace by providing a continuous Quick Reaction Alert capability.

==== No. 2 Group (Air Combat Support) ====
No. 2 Group controls the Air Mobility Force which provides strategic and tactical airlift, air-to-air refuelling and command support air transport (CSAT). The group is also responsible for the Medical Services, Support Force, consisting of its engineering, logistics, intelligence, signals, musical and mountain rescue assets, its Combat and Readiness Force, consisting of its Regiment, and the Air Security Force, consisting of its Police. It oversees stations at Benson and Brize Norton in Oxfordshire, Henlow in Bedfordshire, Honington in Suffolk, Odiham in Hampshire and Northolt in West London.

==== No. 11 Group (Multi-domain operations) ====
No. 11 Group is responsible for integrating operations across the air, cyber and space domains whilst responding to new and evolving threats. It includes the their Battlespace Management Force which controls the UK Air Surveillance and Control System (ASACS). The group oversees stations at Boulmer in Northumberland, Fylingdales in North Yorkshire and Spadeadam in Cumbria.

==== No. 22 Group (Training) ====
No. 22 Group is responsible for the supply of qualified and skilled personnel and provides flying and non-flying training to all three British armed services. It is the end-user of the UK Military Flying Training System which is provided by civilian contractor Ascent Flight Training. The group oversees stations at College Cranwell in Lincolnshire, Cosford and Shawbury in Shropshire, Halton in Buckinghamshire, MOD St Athan in the Vale of Glamorgan, St Mawgan in Cornwall and Valley on Anglesey. The No. 22 Group also manages the Royal Air Force Air Cadets.

=== Stations ===
Map of the Royal Air Force's main stations.
Front-line flying station
Training station
Battlespace management
Support station

An Royal Air Force station is commanded by a group captain. Each station typically hosts several flying and non-flying squadrons or units which are supported by administrative and support wings.

==== United Kingdom ====
Front-line flying operations are focused at eight stations:

- Coningsby, Marham and Lossiemouth (Air Combat)
- Waddington (ISTAR)
- Brize Norton and Northolt (Air Transport)
- Benson and Odiham (Support Helicopter Force operating under Joint Aviation Command)

Flying training takes places at its Barkston Heath, Cranwell, Shawbury and Valley, each forming part of the UK Military Flying Training System which is dedicated to training aircrew for all three UK armed services. Specialist ground crew training is focused at its Cosford, St Mawgan and MOD St. Athan.

Operations are supported by numerous other flying and non-flying stations, with activity focussed at its Honington which coordinates Force Protection and Leeming & Wittering which have a support enabler role.

A Control and Reporting Centre (CRC) at Boulmer is tasked with compiling a Recognised Air Picture of UK air space and providing tactical control of the Quick Reaction Alert Force. In order to achieve this Boulmer is supported by a network of eight Remote Radar Heads (RRHs) spread the length of the UK.

==== Overseas ====
The UK operates permanent military airfields (known as Permanent Joint Operating Bases) in four British Overseas Territories. These bases contribute to the physical defence and maintenance of sovereignty of the British Overseas Territories and enable the UK to conduct expeditionary military operations. Although command and oversight of the bases is provided by Strategic Command, the airfield elements are known as its stations.

- Akrotiri (Sovereign Base Areas of Akrotiri and Dhekelia, Cyprus)
- Ascension Island (Saint Helena, Ascension and Tristan da Cuhna)
- Mount Pleasant (Falkland Islands)
- Gibraltar (Gibraltar)

Four of its squadrons are based overseas. No. 17 Test and Evaluation Squadron is based at Edwards Air Force Base, California, in the United States and works in close cooperation with the U.S. Air Force in the development of the Lockheed Martin F-35B Lightning. No. 80 Squadron is part of the Australia, Canada and United Kingdom Reprogramming Laboratory (ACURL) at Eglin Air Force Base, Florida, and is tasked with compiling and testing the Mission Data File Sets (MDFS) for the F-35. No. 84 Squadron is located at Akrotiri in a search and rescue role. No. 230 Squadron are based at Medicina Lines, Brunei.

=== Squadrons ===
A flying squadron is an aircraft unit which carries out the primary tasks. Its squadrons are somewhat analogous to the regiments of the British Army in that they have histories and traditions going back to their formation, regardless of where they are based or which aircraft they are operating. They can be awarded standards and battle honours for meritorious service. Most flying squadrons are commanded by a wing commander and, for a fast-jet squadron, have a complement of around twelve aircraft.

=== Flights ===
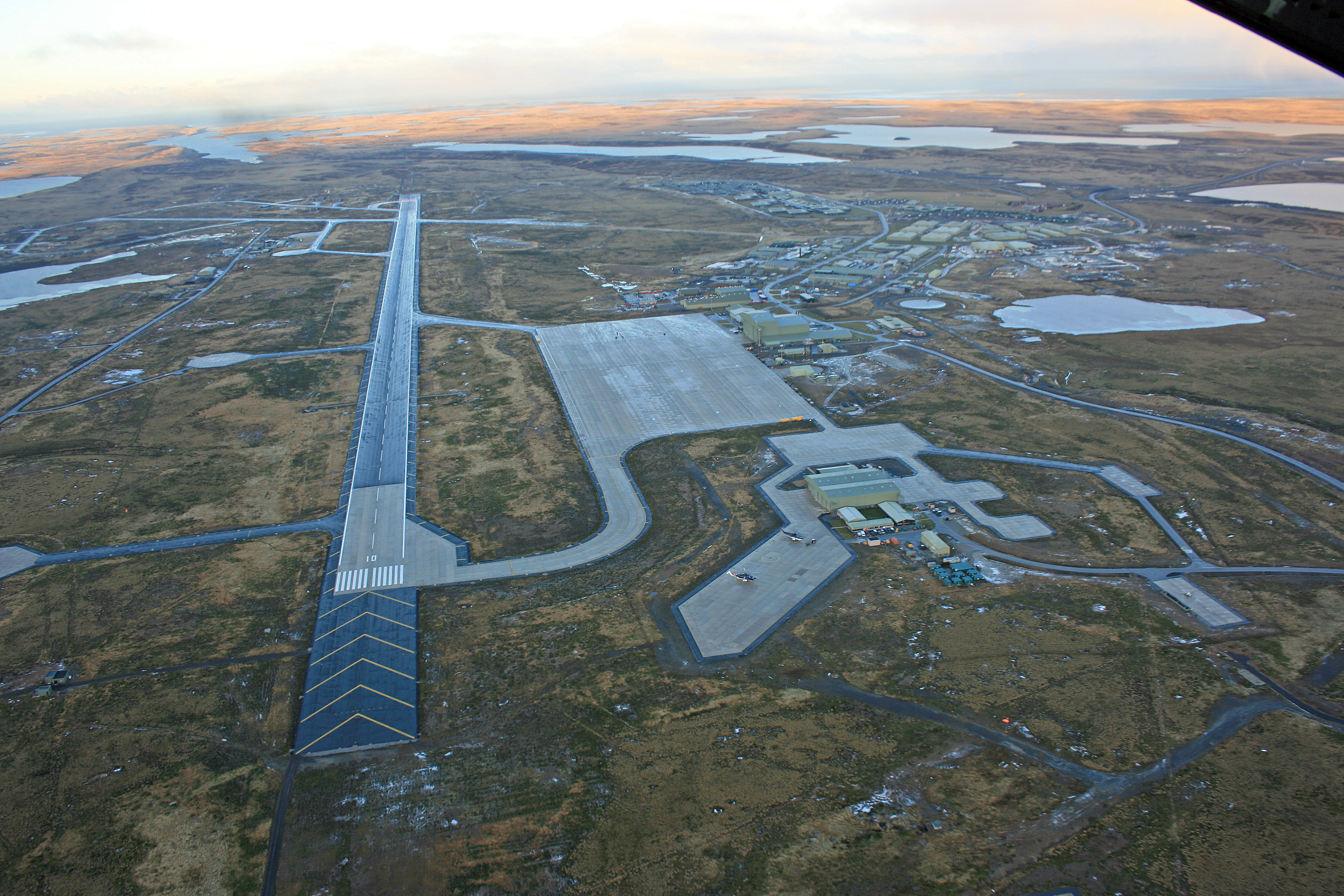
RAF Mount Pleasant, home to No. 1435 Flight providing air defence for the Falkland Islands.

Independent flights are so designated because they are explicitly smaller in size than a squadron. Many independent flights are, or have been, front-line flying units. For example, No. 1435 Flight carries out air defence duties for the Falkland Islands, with four Eurofighter Typhoon fighters based at Mount Pleasant.

=== Support wings and units ===
Support capabilities are provided by several specialist wings and other units.

- Air and Space Warfare Centre (RAF Waddington)
- Airborne Delivery Wing (RAF Brize Norton)
- Mobile Meteorological Unit (RAF Waddington)
- Tactical Communications Wing (RAF Leeming)
- Tactical Medical Wing (RAF Brize Norton)
- Tactical Supply Wing (MOD Stafford)
- No. 1 Air Control Centre (RAF Boulmer)
- No. 1 Air Mobility Wing (RAF Brize Norton)
- No. 1 Intelligence, Surveillance and Reconnaissance Wing (RAF Waddington)
- No. 42 (Expeditionary Support) Wing (RAF Wittering)
- No. 85 (Expeditionary Logistics) Wing (RAF Wittering)
- No. 90 Signals Unit (RAF Leeming)

=== Expeditionary Air Wings ===
Command, control, and support for overseas operations is typically provided through Expeditionary Air Wings (EAWs). Each wing is brought together as and when required and comprises the deployable elements of its home station as well as other support elements from throughout the RAF.

- No. 34 Expeditionary Air Wing (Waddington) – ISTAR operations
- No. 38 Expeditionary Air Wing (Brize Norton) – air transport operations
- No. 121 Expeditionary Air Wing (Coningsby) – multi-role operations
- No. 135 Expeditionary Air Wing (Leeming) – fighter operations
- No. 138 Expeditionary Air Wing (Marham) – fighter operations
- No. 140 Expeditionary Air Wing (Lossiemouth) – fighter operations

Several Expeditionary Air Wings are based overseas:

- No. 901 Expeditionary Air Wing (Al Udeid Air Base, Qatar) – Communication and information systems support
- No. 902 Expeditionary Air Wing (Middle East) – Helicopter support
- No. 903 Expeditionary Air Wing (Akrotiri, Cyprus) – Supports Operation Shader
- No. 905 Expeditionary Air Wing (Mount Pleasant, Falklands Islands) – Protection of British Overseas Territories in the South Atlantic
- No. 906 Expeditionary Air Wing (Middle East) – Air transport support

=== Training schools ===
==== Flying training ====
Its Schools consist of the squadrons and support apparatus that train new aircrew to join front-line squadrons. The schools separate individual streams, but group together units with similar responsibility or that operate the same aircraft type. Some schools operate with only one squadron, and have an overall training throughput which is relatively small; some, like No. 3 Flying Training School, have responsibility for all Elementary Flying Training (EFT), and all of its aircrew will pass through its squadrons when they start their flying careers. No. 2 Flying Training School and No. 6 Flying Training School do not have a front-line training responsibility – their job is to group the University Air Squadrons and the Volunteer Gliding Squadrons together. The commanding officer of No. 2 FTS holds the only full-time flying appointment for a Group Captain and is a reservist.

- Central Flying School (Cranwell) – standardises flying training across the air force and ensures standards and safety are maintained.
- No. 1 Flying Training School (Shawbury) – basic and advanced helicopter training.
- No. 2 Flying Training School (Syerston) – gliding training provided by Volunteer Gliding Squadrons based at airfields throughout the UK.
- No. 3 Flying Training School (Cranwell) – Elementary Flying Training (EFT), Fleet Air Arm and Army Air Corps crews, also operates from Wittering and Barkston Heath.
- No. 4 Flying Training School (Valley) – Basic Fast Jet Training (BFJT) and Advanced Fast Jet Training (AFJT).
- No. 6 Flying Training School (Cranwell) – Initial training provided by University Air Squadrons and Air Experience Flights based at airfields throughout the UK.

==== Non-flying training ====
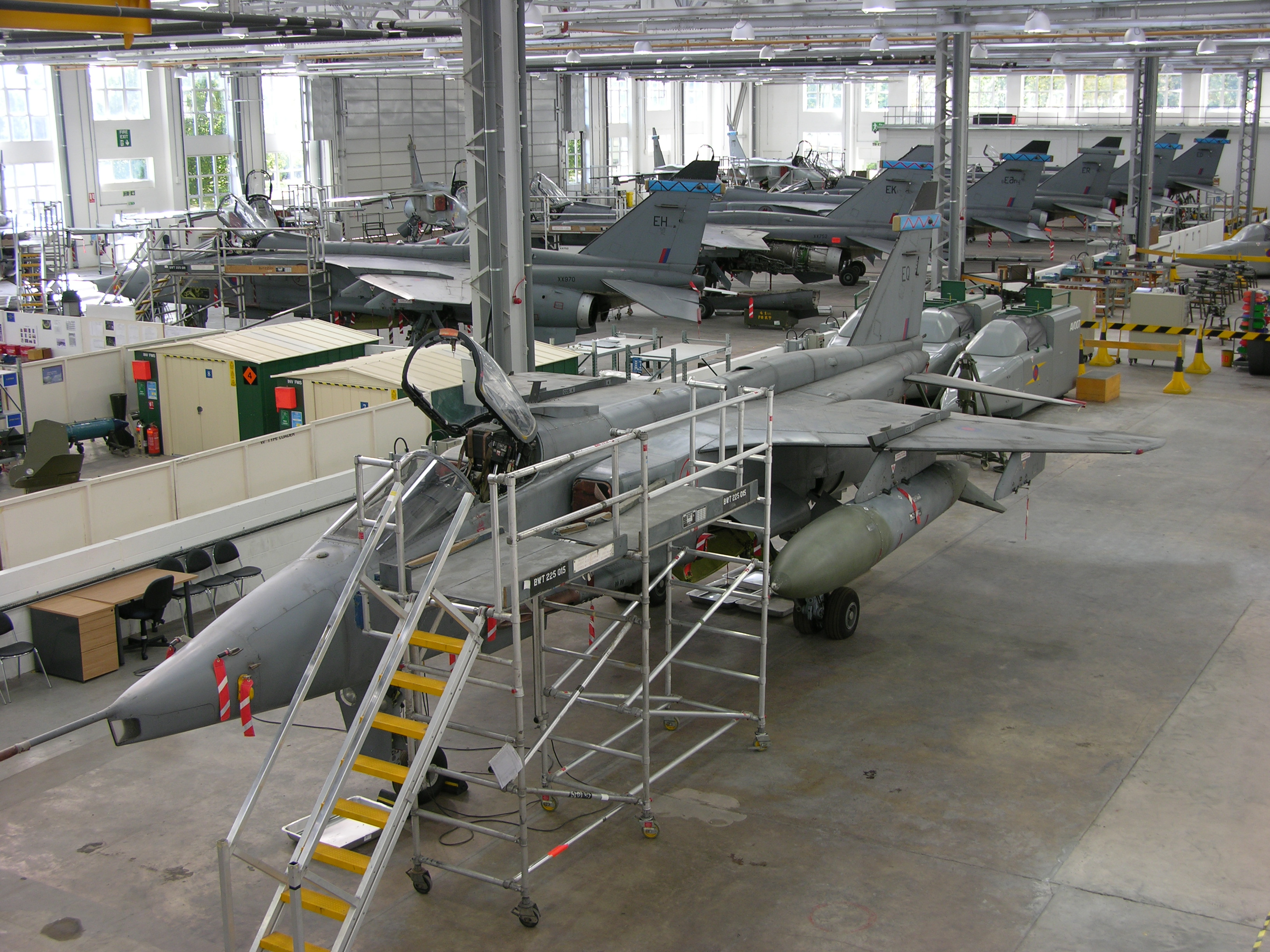
Jaguar aircraft used for training by No.1 School of Technical Training at RAF Cosford

The British military operate a number of joint training organisations, with Air Command leading the provision of technical training through the Defence College of Technical Training (DCTT). It provides training in aeronautical engineering, electro and mechanical engineering, and communication and information systems.

- No. 1 School of Technical Training is based at Cosford and provides personnel with mechanical, avionics, weapons and survival equipment training. Also based at Cosford is the Aerosystems Engineer and Management Training School. Both are part of the Defence School of Aeronautical Engineering.
- No. 4 School of Technical Training is part of the Defence School of Electronic and Mechanical Engineering (DSEME) and is based at MOD St Athan. It provides training to non-aircraft ground engineering technicians.
- No. 1 Radio School and the Aerial Erectors School are based at Cosford and Digby respectively and are part of the Defence School of Communications and Information Systems.

==== Specialist training and education ====
The Royal Air Force operates several units and centres for the provision of non-generic training and education. These include the Royal Air Force Leadership Centre and the Centre for Air Power Studies, both based at Cranwell, and the Air Warfare Centre, based at Waddington and Cranwell. Non-commissioned officer training and developmental courses occur at Halton and officer courses occur at the Joint Services Command and Staff College at Shrivenham.

== Personnel ==
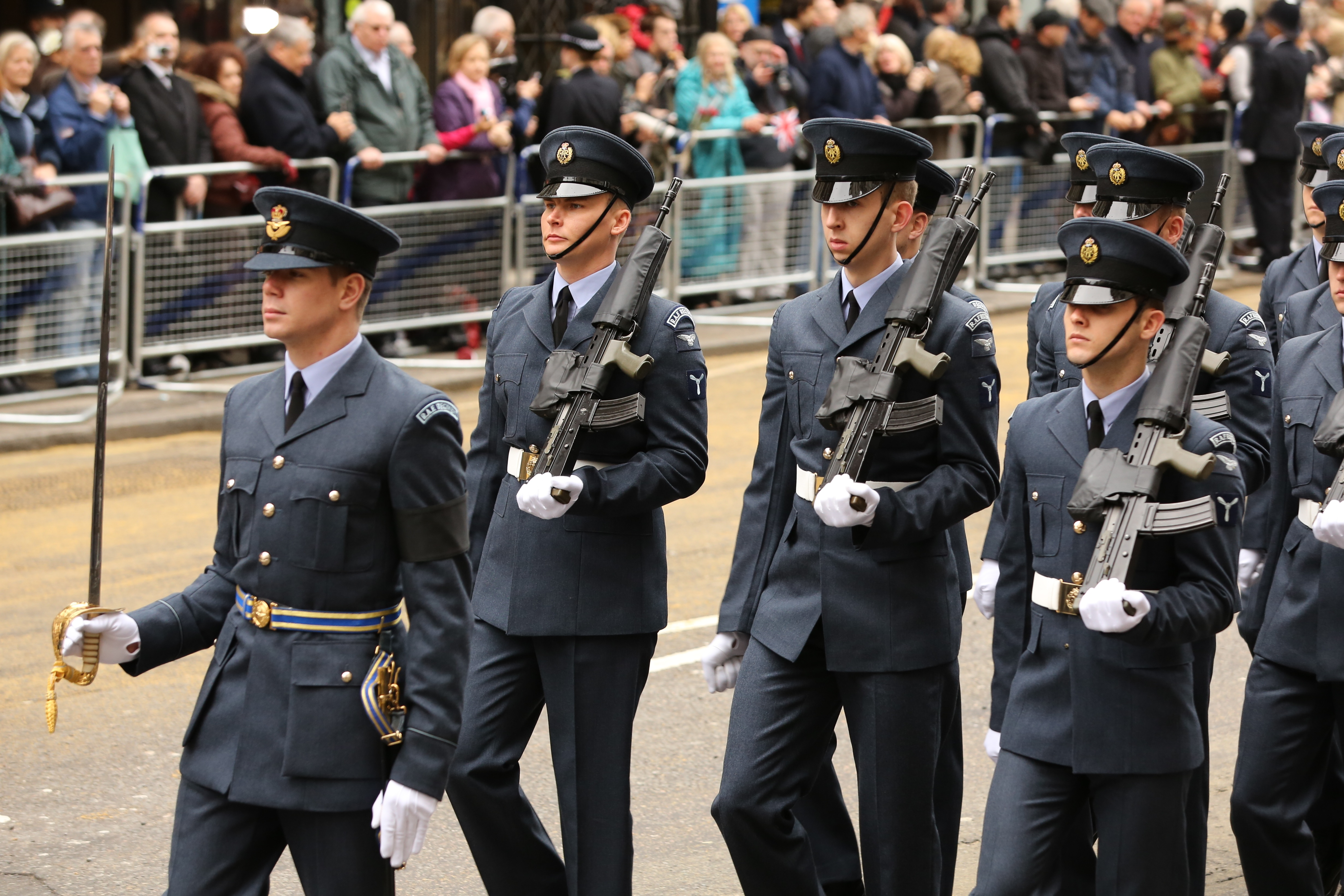
Members of the Regiment on parade, 2013

At its height in 1944 during the Second World War, more than 1,100,000 personnel were serving in the RAF. The longest-lived founding member of the RAF was Henry Allingham, who died on 18 July 2009 aged 113.

As of 1 January 2015, the numbered some 34,200 Regular and 1,940 Royal Auxiliary Air Force personnel, giving a combined component strength of 36,140 personnel. In addition to the active elements of the, (Regular and Royal Auxiliary Air Force), all ex-Regular personnel remain liable to be recalled for duty in a time of need, this is known as the Regular Reserve. In 2007, there were 33,980 RAF Regular Reserves, of which 7,950 served under a fixed-term reserve contract. Publications since April 2013 no-longer report the entire strength of the Regular Reserve, instead they only give a figure for Regular Reserves who serve under a fixed-term reserve contract. They had a strength of 7,120 personnel in 2014.

Figures provided by the International Institute for Strategic Studies from 2012 showed that pilots achieved a relatively high number of flying hours per year when compared with other major NATO allies such as France and Germany. Pilots achieved 210 to 290 flying hours per year. French and German Air Force pilots achieved 180 and 150 flying hours across their fleets respectively. However, as of 2025–26 these numbers had fallen significantly. In the F-35B fleet, monthly flying hours per pilot had already been cut from 10 to approximately 7.5 (or about 90 hours per year), and even this target was said not be being met for all pilots. This was coupled with a shortage of both pilots and engineers. Pilot-to-aircraft ratios for the F-35 were reported at about 1:1, which were argued by some to be "far below the 1.3 to 1.5 considered healthy in most air forces".

=== Officers ===
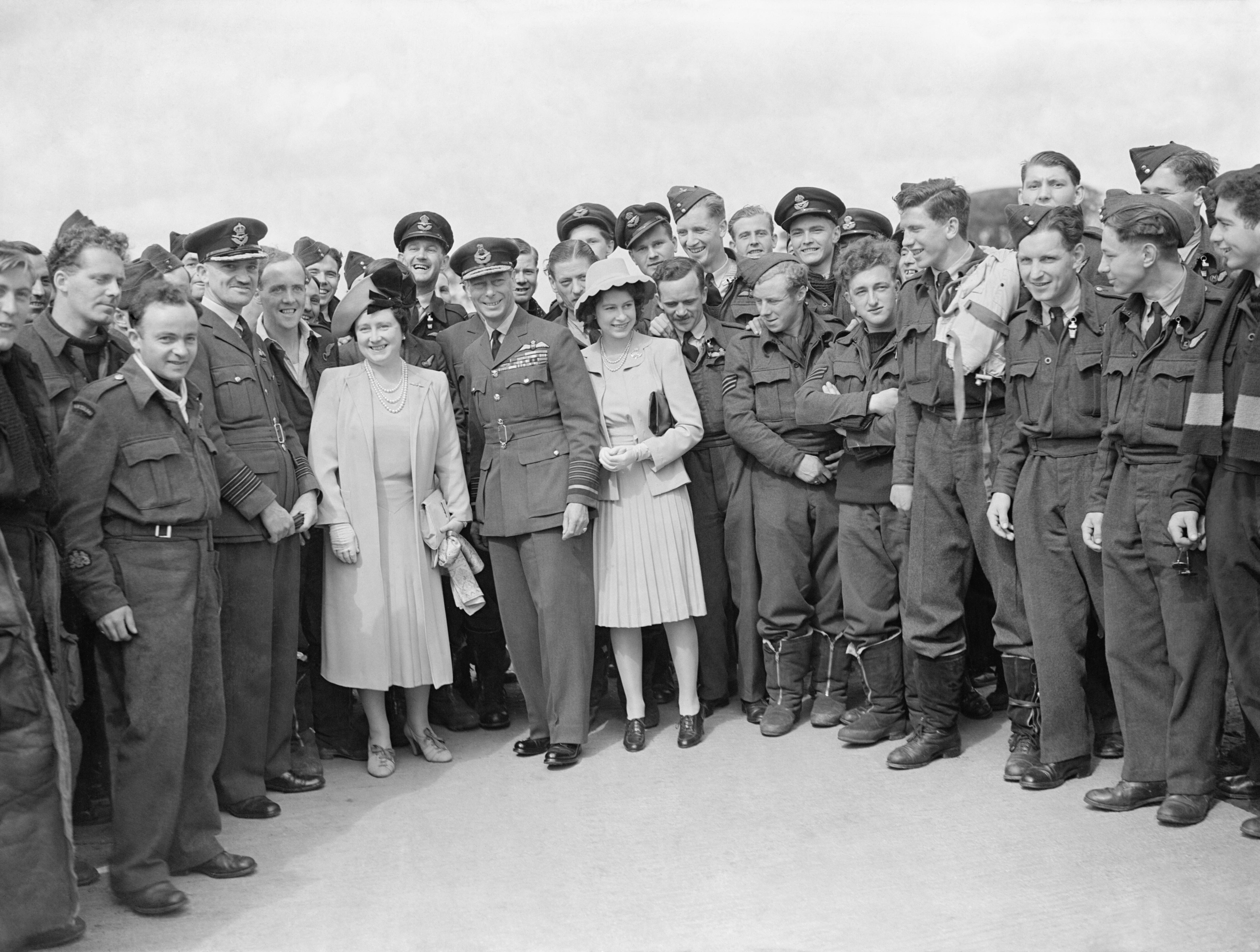
King George VI, Queen Elizabeth, and Princess Elizabeth with its personnel during World War II

Officers hold a commission from the sovereign, which provides the legal authority for them to issue orders to subordinates. The commission of a regular officer is granted after successfully completing the 24-week-long Initial Officer Training course at the College, Cranwell, Lincolnshire.

To emphasise the merger of both military and naval aviation when it was formed, many of the titles of officers were deliberately chosen to be of a naval character, such as flight lieutenant, wing commander, group captain, and air commodore.

In 1952, officers served in one of fourteen branches: Catering; Chaplains; Dental; Education; Equipment; Fighter Control; General Duties (i.e. aircrew); Legal; Medical; Physical Fitness; Provost; Regiment; Secretarial; and Technical. All except General Duties and the Regiment were open to women.

=== Other ranks ===
Other ranks attend the Recruit Training Squadron at Halton for basic training. The titles and insignia of other ranks were based on that of the Army, with some alterations in terminology. Over the years, this structure has seen significant changes: for example, there was once a separate system for those in technical trades, and the ranks of chief technician and junior technician continue to be held only by personnel in technical trades. Other ranks fall into four categories: warrant officers, senior non-commissioned officers, junior non-commissioned officers and airmen. All its warrant officers are equal in terms of rank, but the most senior non-commissioned appointment is known as the Warrant Officer of the Royal Air Force.

From 1952, trades for airmen and airwomen were grouped into 23 trade groups: Accounting and Secretarial; Air Traffic Control and Fire Services; Aircraft Engineering; Airfield Construction; Armament Engineering; Catering; Dental; Electrical and Instrument Engineering; General Duties (i.e. aircrew); General Engineering; General Service; Ground Signalling; Marine Craft; Mechanical Transport; Medical; Music; Photography; Police; Radar Operating; Radio Engineering; Regiment; Safety and Surface; and Supply. All were open to women except Air Traffic Control and Fire Services, Airfield Construction, General Duties, Marine Craft and the Regiment

== Ranks ==
Rank insignia of the commissioned officers of the Royal Air Force
Rank group	Officers of air rank					Senior officers			Junior officers			Officer cadets
NATO code	OF-10	OF-9	OF-8	OF-7	OF-6	OF-5	OF-4	OF-3	OF-2	OF-1		N/A
Insignia												
Rank	Marshal of the Royal Air Force	Air chief marshal	Air marshal	Air vice-marshal	Air commodore	Group captain	Wing commander	Squadron leader	Flight lieutenant	Flying officer	Pilot officer	Officer cadet
Abbreviation	MRAF	Air Chf Mshl	Air Mshl	AVM	Air Cdre	Gp Capt	Wg Cdr	Sqn Ldr	Flt Lt	Fg Off	Plt Off	Off Cdt

Rank insignia of the other ranks of the Royal Air Force
Rank group	Warrant officers	Senior NCOs				Junior NCOs		Aviators			
NATO code	OR-9	OR-7		OR-6	OR-5	OR-4	OR-3	OR-2			OR-1
Insignia											No insignia
Typical appointment	Warrant officer of the Royal Air Force										
Rank	Warrant officer	Flight sergeant	Chief technician	Sergeant		Corporal	Lance corporal (RAF Regiment)	Air specialist (class 1) technician	Air specialist (class 1)	Air specialist (class 2)	Air recruit
Abbreviation	WO	FS	Chf Tech	Sgt		Cpl	LCpl	AS1(T)	AS1	AS2	AR
Aircrew insignia						No equivalent					
Rank	Master aircrew	Flight sergeant aircrew		Sergeant aircrew		No equivalent					
Abbreviation	MAcr	FSAcr		SAcr		No equivalent					

== Aircraft ==
=== Air combat ===
==== Typhoon ====
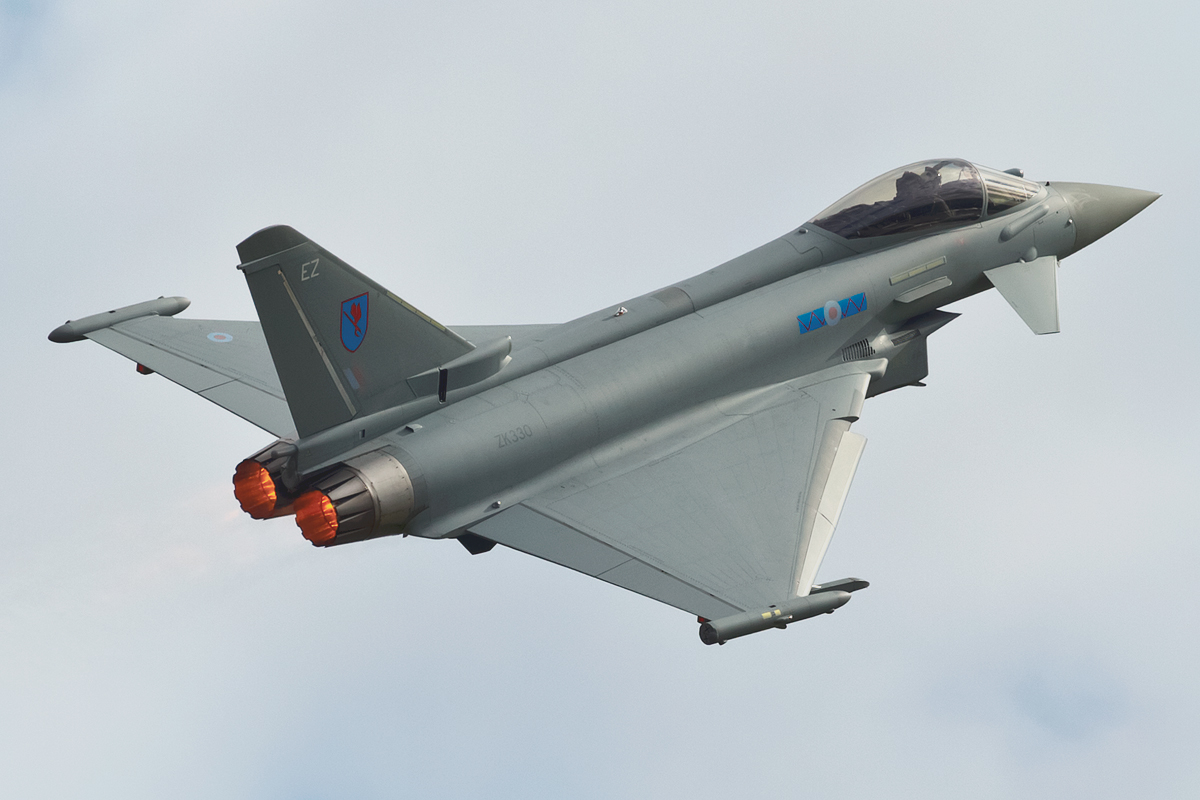
Typhoon FGR4

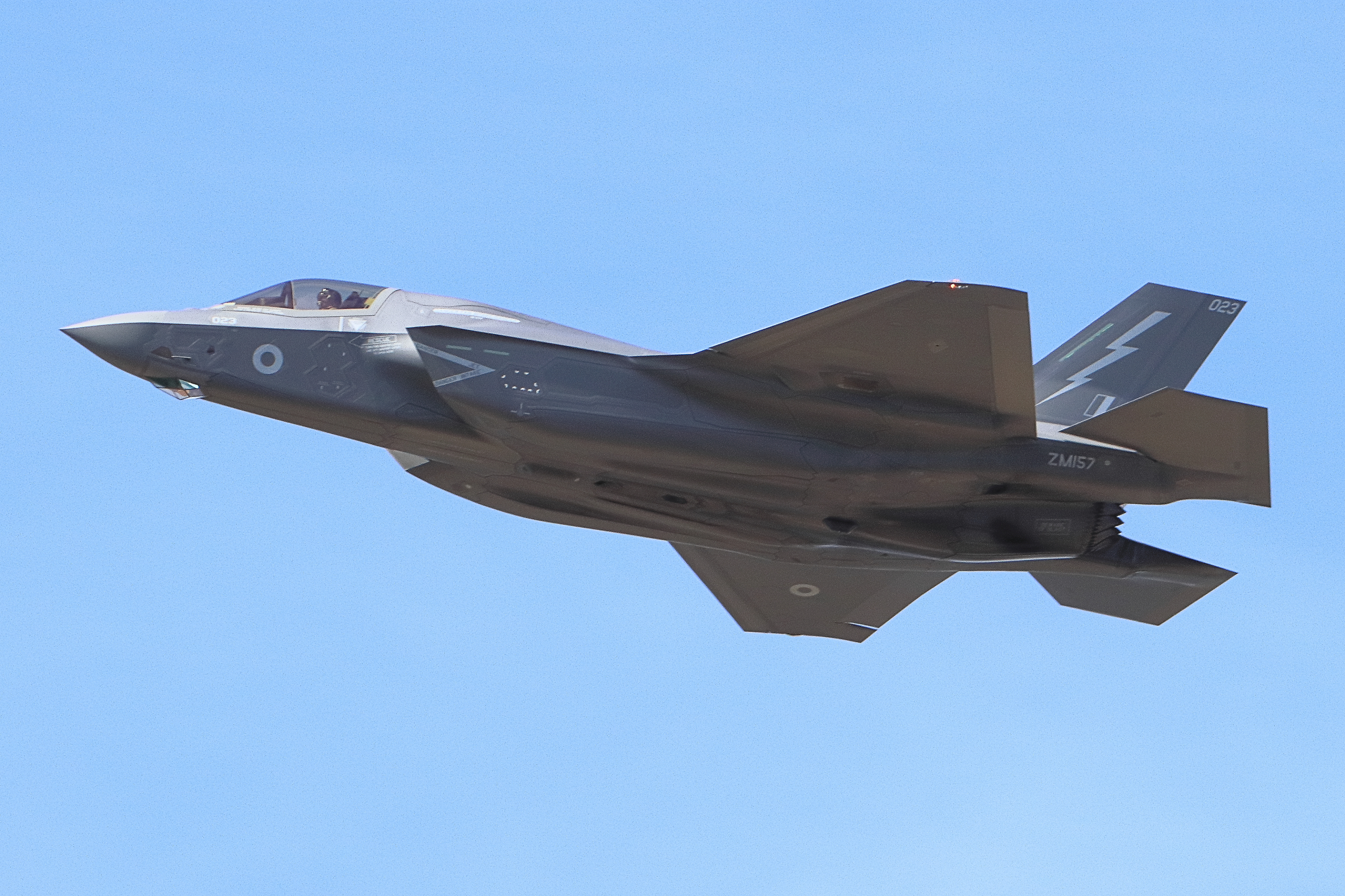
F-35B Lightning

The Eurofighter Typhoon FGR4 is their primary multi-role air defence and ground attack fighter aircraft, following the retirement of the Panavia Tornado F3 in late March 2011. With the completion of 'Project Centurion' upgrades, the Typhoon FGR4 took over ground attack duties from the Panavia Tornado GR4, which was retired on 1 April 2019. The Typhoon is tasked with defending UK airspace, while also frequently deploying in support of NATO air defence missions in the Baltic (Operation Azotize), Black Sea (Operation Biloxi), Iceland (Icelandic Air Policing) and Poland (Operation Chessman).

They have seven front-line Typhoon squadrons, plus an Operational Conversion Unit (OCU), and Operational Evaluation Unit (OEU); No. 3 (Fighter) Squadron, No. XI (F) Squadron, No. 12 Squadron (joint RAF / Qatar Air Force), No. 29 Squadron (OCU), and No. 41 Test and Evaluation Squadron (OEU) based at Coningsby; with No. 1 (F) Squadron, No. II (Army Cooperation) Squadron, No. 6 Squadron, and No. IX (Bomber) Squadron based at Lossiemouth. Additionally, four Typhoons (Faith, Hope, Charity, and Desperation) are based at Mount Pleasant on the Falkland Islands, forming No. 1435 Flight, where they provide air defence. It was originally suggested that an eighth front-line Typhoon squadron could be formed; however, the 2021 Defence Command Paper announced the retirement of 24 Tranche 1 Typhoons by 2025, and a commitment to seven front-line squadrons. On 31 March 2025, the majority of Tranche 1 Typhoons were withdrawn from use, with the last four remaining as part of No. 1435 Flight until 2027.

The Typhoon made its combat debut in support of Operation Ellamy in 2011, and has been supporting Operation Shader since December 2015. Typhoons have also been supporting Operation Poseidon Archer since January 2024. The Typhoon made its first air-to-air kill in December 2021, shooting down a small hostile drone near Al-Tanf base, Syria, with an ASRAAM.

==== Lightning ====
The Lockheed Martin F-35 Lightning is a single-seat, single-engine, all-weather stealth multirole combat aircraft. It is intended to perform both air superiority and strike missions while also providing electronic warfare and intelligence, surveillance, and reconnaissance capabilities. The F-35B, with the ability to perform short take-offs and vertical-landings (STOVL), is jointly operated by them and the naval Fleet Air Arm (FAA), who regularly operate from the Royal Navy's two Queen Elizabeth-class aircraft carriers. The F-35A is currently on order to allow the RAF to participate in NATO's nuclear mission. Originally, a total of 138 F-35B Lightnings were planned; however, the 2021 Defence Command Paper amended this to a commitment to increase the fleet beyond the current order of 48. In June 2025, the second phase procurement plan was announced, with the purchase of 12 F-35As and 17 F-35Bs, taking the fleet up to 75 jets ordered. By March 2026, 48 F-35Bs had been delivered to them (though one of these crashed in November 2021). The F-35B has an out of service date (OSD) of 2069.

The first squadron to operate the F-35B was No. 17 Test and Evaluation Squadron at Edwards AFB, California, accepting its first aircraft in 2014. No. 617 (The Dambusters) Squadron officially reformed on 18 April 2018 as the first operational Lightning squadron. The first four aircraft arrived at Marham from the United States in June 2018, with a further five arriving in August 2018. The Lightning was declared combat ready in January 2019. The second UK based F-35B squadron to be formed was No. 207 Squadron on 1 August 2019 as the OCU for both and Royal Navy pilots. The second front line F-35B squadron to be formed was 809 Naval Air Squadron (FAA) on 8 December 2023, and is crewed by a mix of Royal Navy and personnel, as are the other F-35B squadrons.

At the 2025 NATO Summit at The Hague, Prime Minister Keir Starmer announced it will acquire at least twelve nuclear capable F-35As. This marks the return of a nuclear role for the for the first time since 1998, when the UK retired the WE.177 bombs from service. According to the MoD, the F-35As will be based at Marham and will help the stand-up of a third front line F-35 Lightning squadron. The OCU, No. 207 Squadron, will conduct day-to-day operations with the F-35A in a training role, due to their increased flight time and decreased maintenance requirements. The 2026 Defence Investment Plan did not confirm the order or specific timing for additional F-35B aircraft, though it noted that 12 F-35A aircraft would likely be ordered for delivery in the early 2030s.

=== Intelligence, surveillance, target acquisition, and reconnaissance (ISTAR) ===
==== Shadow ====
Eight Shadows, six Shadow R1+ and two Shadow R2 are operated by No. 14 Squadron from Waddington, these aircraft are King Air 350CERs that have been specially converted for the ISTAR role. Four Shadow R1s were originally ordered in 2007 due to an Urgent Operational Requirement, and began the conversion process to the ISTAR role in 2009. The 2026 Defence Investment Plan indicated these aircraft were to be superseded by autonomous systems.

==== Protector ====
The General Atomics Protector RG1 was officially introduced into their service on 17 Jun 2025 with 31 Squadron, with operational flying beginning in late 2025. On 7 October 2015, it was revealed that Protector would be a certifiable derivative of the MQ-9B SkyGuardian with enhanced range and endurance. In 2016, it was indicated that at least sixteen aircraft would be purchased with a maximum of up to twenty-six. In July 2018, a General Atomics US civil-registered SkyGuardian was flown from North Dakota to Fairford for the Royal International Air Tattoo where it was given their markings. In July 2020, the Ministry of Defence signed a contract for three Protectors with an option on an additional thirteen aircraft. The 2021 Defence Command Paper confirmed the order for 16 Protectors, despite the fact that the 2015 SDSR originally laid out plans for more than 20. The first Protector RG1 (PR009) was delivered to Waddington in September 2023. No. 31 Squadron was reformed as the first Protector squadron on 11 October 2023, having been earmarked for the role in 2018. As of June 2025, ten Protector UAVs were in service with the remaining 6 aircraft to be delivered by the end of the year.

==== RC-135W Rivet Joint ====
Three Boeing RC-135W Rivet Joints replaced the Hawker Siddeley Nimrod R1 fleet in the signals intelligence role under the Airseeker Programme and are flown by No. 51 Squadron. The Nimrod fleet was retired in 2011, following which the RAF co-manned aircraft of the US Air Force until the three RC-135s entered RAF service between 2014 and 2017. The aircraft were Boeing KC-135R Stratotanker tankers converted to RC-135W standard in the most complex combined Foreign Military Sales case and co-operative support arrangement that the UK had undertaken with the United States Air Force since the Second World War.

The Rivet Joint received its first operational deployment in August 2014, when it was deployed to the Middle East to fly missions over Iraq and Syria as part of Operation Shader. The RC-135W's OSD is 2035.

==== Wedgetail ====
They are expecting to take initial delivery in end of 2025 of three E-7 Wedgetail Airborne Warning and Control Systems (AWACS) aircraft that will be designated Wedgetail AEW1 and operated by 8 Squadron at Lossiemouth. The expected in-service date has been repeatedly delayed and is now expected in late 2026. Wedgetail provides crucial Airborne Early Warning and Control (AEW&C) capabilities. It generates high-resolution radar data and shares it in real-time through advanced communication links.

==== Other ISTAR Units ====
Based at Waddington, No. 54 Squadron and No. 56 Squadron act as the OCU and OEU for the ISTAR fleet respectively.

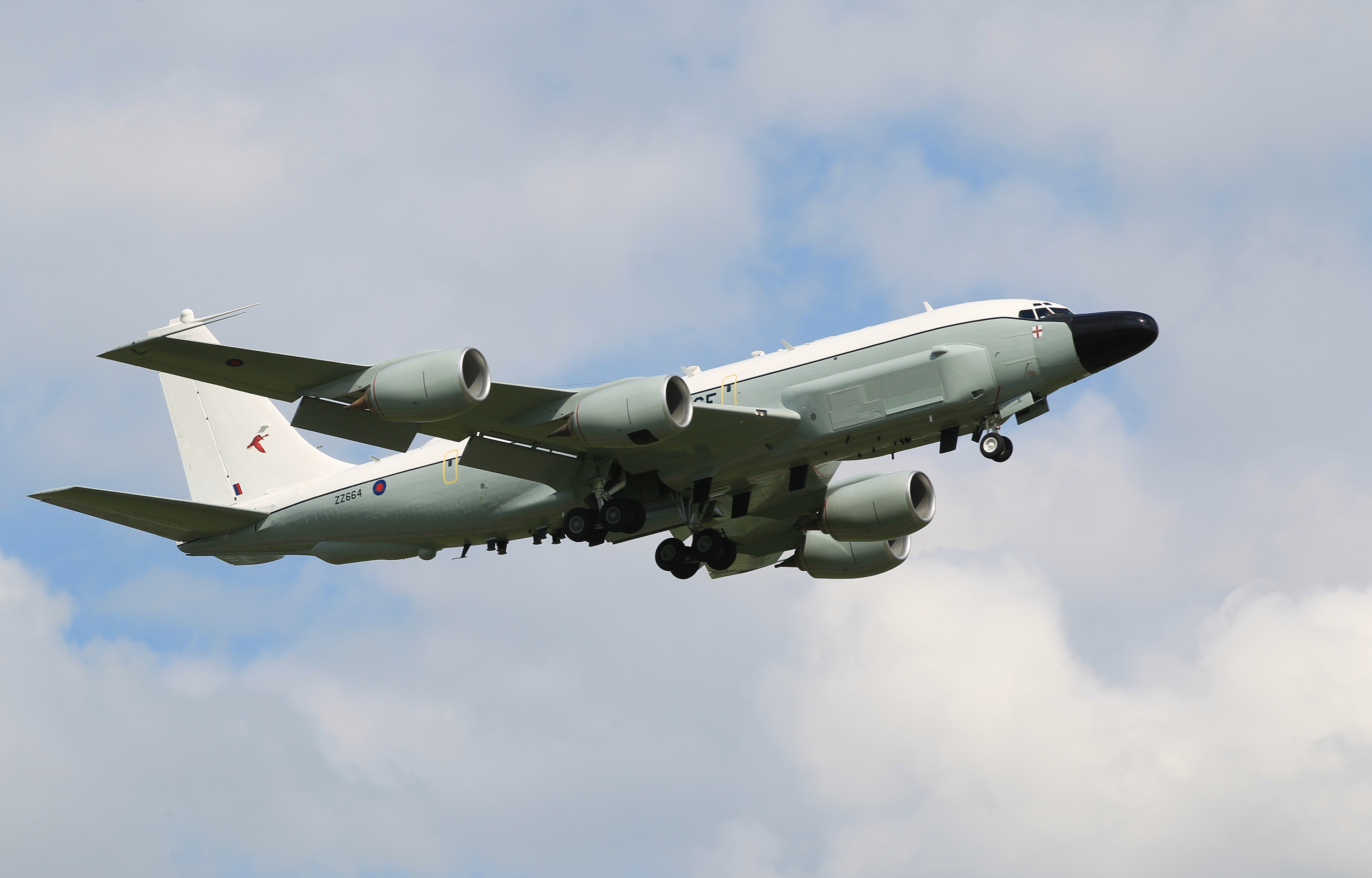
RC-135W Rivet Joint

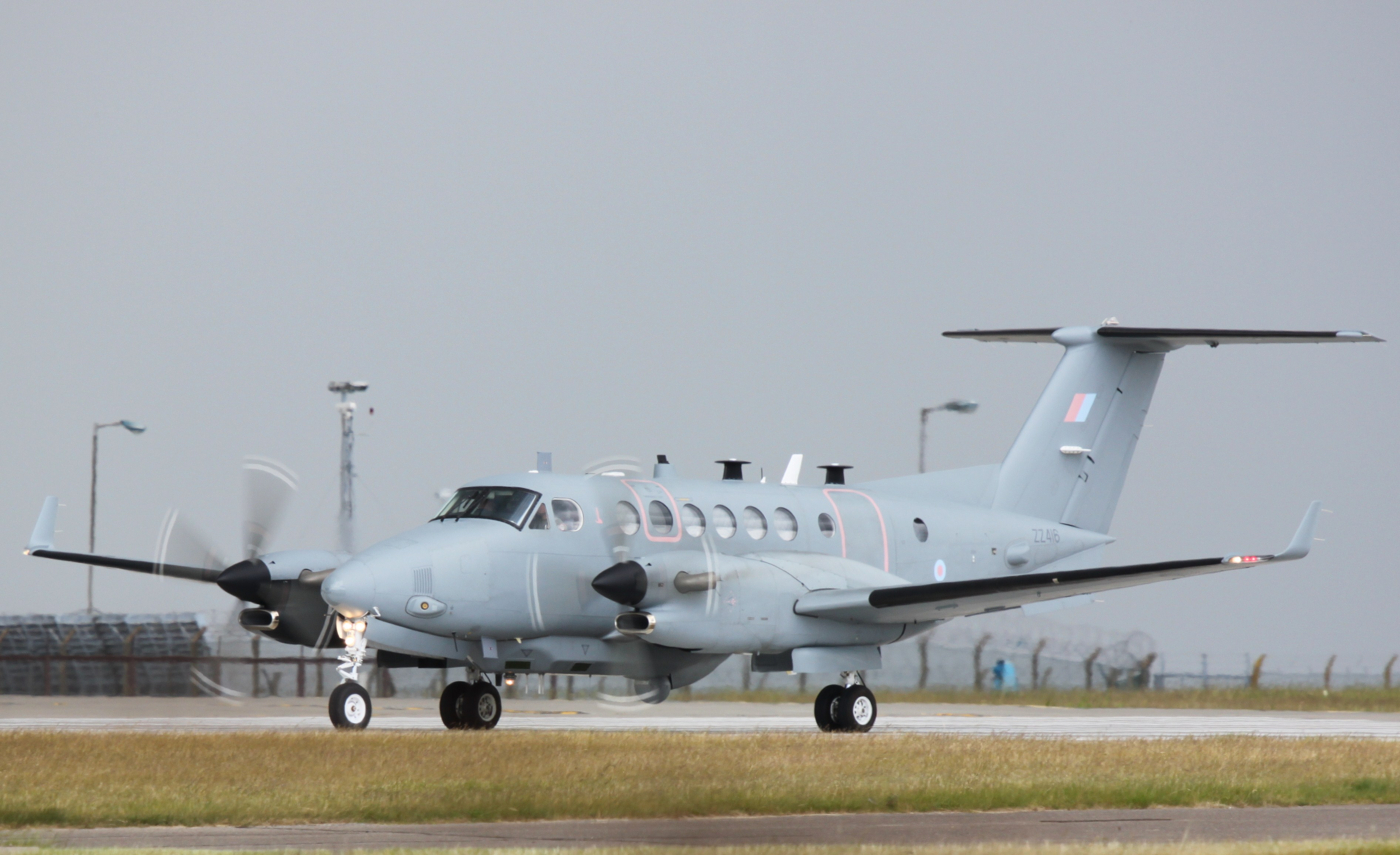
Shadow R1

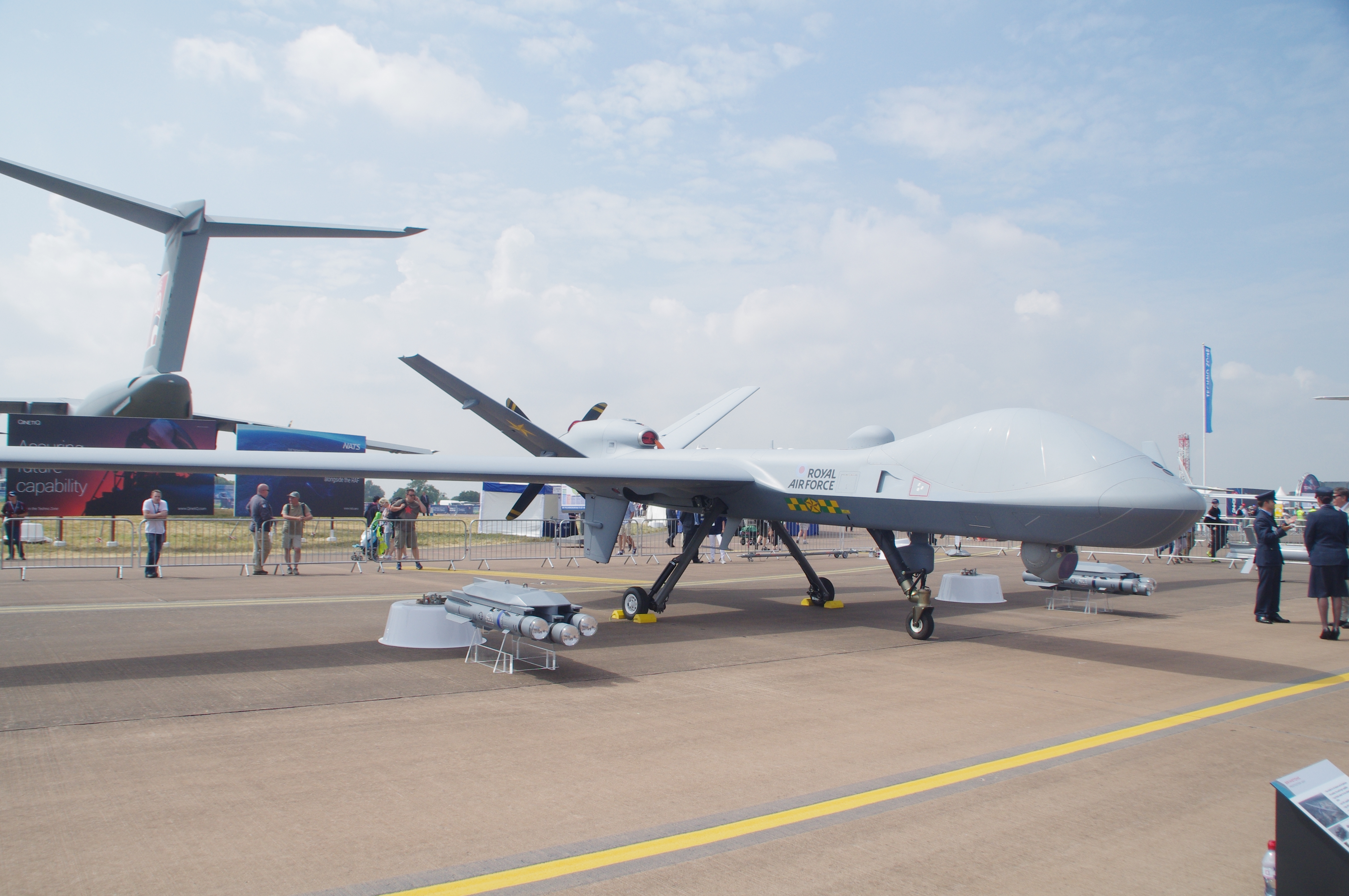
Protector RG1

=== Maritime patrol ===
==== Poseidon MRA1 ====
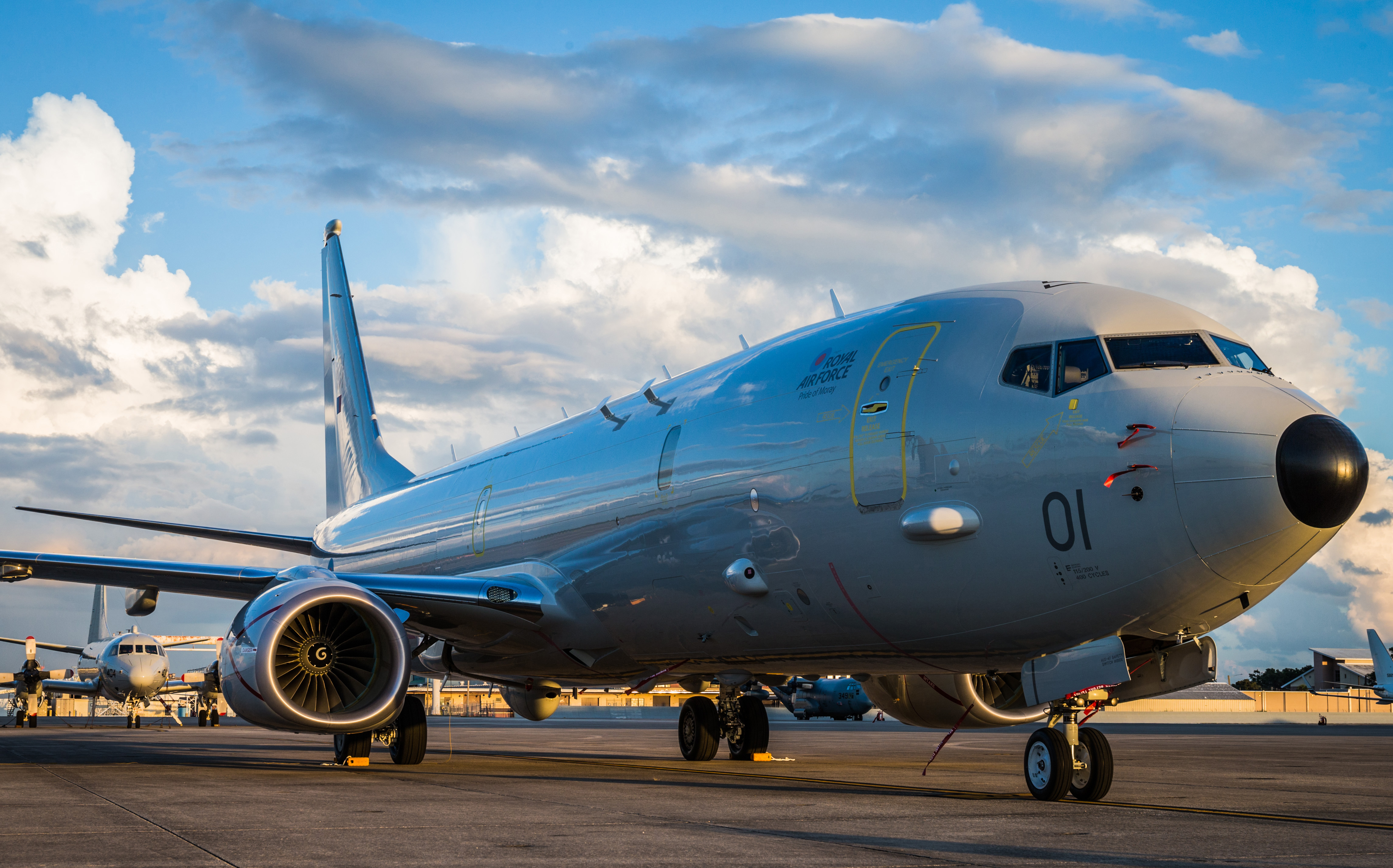
Poseidon MRA1

Nine Boeing Poseidon MRA1 were ordered by the British government in November 2015 in its Strategic Defence and Security Review for surveillance, anti-submarine and anti-surface ship warfare, filling a capability gap in maritime patrol that had been left since the cancellation of the BAE Systems Nimrod MRA4 programme in the 2010 SDSR. On 13 July 2017, it was announced that No. 120 Squadron and No. 201 Squadron, both former Nimrod MR2 squadrons, would operate the Poseidon and be based at RAF Lossiemouth. No. 120 Squadron was stood up on 1 April 2018, with No. 201 Squadron reforming on 7 August 2021. No. 54 Squadron was the OCU for the Poseidon fleet between 2020 and 2023. No. 42 (Torpedo Bomber) Squadron has been the OCU for the Poseidon since September 2023.

The first production Poseidon MRA1 ZP801 made its initial flight on 13 July 2019. ZP801 arrived at Kinloss Barracks, the former home of the Nimrod, on 4 February 2020, filling a decade long gap in maritime capability. The Poseidon was declared combat ready in April 2020. The Poseidon carried out its first operational mission on 3 August 2020, when the Russian warship Vasily Bykov was tracked. A Poseidon MRA1 arrived at Lossiemouth for the first time in October 2020. The ninth, and final Poseidon arrived at Lossiemouth on 11 January 2022.

=== Air mobility ===
==== C-17A Globemaster III ====
No. 99 Squadron operate eight Boeing C-17A Globemaster III in the heavy strategic airlift role from Brize Norton, Oxfordshire. Four C-17A were originally leased from Boeing in 2000, These four were subsequently purchased outright, followed by a fifth delivered on 7 April 2008 and a sixth delivered on 11 June 2008. The MOD said there was "a stated departmental requirement for eight" C-17s and a seventh was subsequently ordered, to be delivered in December 2010. In February 2012 the purchase of an eighth C-17 was confirmed; the aircraft arrived at Brize Norton in May 2012. As with all US Foreign Military Sales, the aircraft retains its US designation rather than getting a UK style designation.

==== Atlas C.1 ====
The Airbus Atlas C1 (A400M) replaced the fleet of C-130 Hercules, initially replacing the C1/C3 (C-130K) which were withdrawn from use on 28 October 2013, having originally entered service in 1967. Based at Brize Norton, the Atlas fleet is operated by No. 30 Squadron and No. LXX Squadron. The first Atlas C1 (ZM400) was delivered to them in November 2014. Originally, twenty-five A400Ms were ordered in the initial batch; the total initial purchase then dropped to twenty-two. The final aircraft in the initial order of 22 aircraft was delivered in May 2023. In February 2023, the Chief of the Air Staff indicated that up to six additional aircraft were planned for delivery by 2030. However, the 2026 defence investment plan made no mention of acquiring any additional aircraft. The C-130J Hercules was retired from service on 30 June 2023.

No. XXIV Squadron acts as the Air Mobility OCU (AMOCU) for the Globemaster and Atlas, while No. 206 Squadron is the OEU.

==== Voyager KC2/3 ====
Air transport tasks are also carried out by the Airbus Voyager KC2/3, flown by No. 10 Squadron and No. 101 Squadron. The first Voyager (ZZ330) arrived in the UK for testing at MOD Boscombe Down in April 2011, and entered service in April 2012. The Voyager received approval from the MOD on 16 May 2013 to begin air-to-air refuelling flights and made its first operational tanker flight on 20 May 2013 as part of a training sortie with Tornado GR4s. By 21 May 2013, the Voyager fleet had carried more than 50,000 passengers and carried more than 3,000 tons of cargo. A total of fourteen Voyagers form the fleet, with nine allocated to sole RAF use (three KC2s and six KC3s). One Voyager, known as Vespina, performs a VIP transport role for the Royal Family, the Prime Minister, and other government ministers alongside its normal transport and aerial refuelling roles; it is painted in a 'Global Britain' livery and is fitted with business class-style seats. As the Voyagers lack a refuelling boom, they have requested a memorandum of understanding (MoU) with the USAF allowing the UK access to tankers equipped with refuelling booms for its RC-135W Rivet Joint .

==== Envoy CC1 ====
Known as the Envoy IV CC1 in British service, the aircraft are based at Northolt and are operated by a mixed civilian and No. 32 (The Royal) Squadron crew. This arrangement will remain until 2026 when the fleet will be placed on the military register.

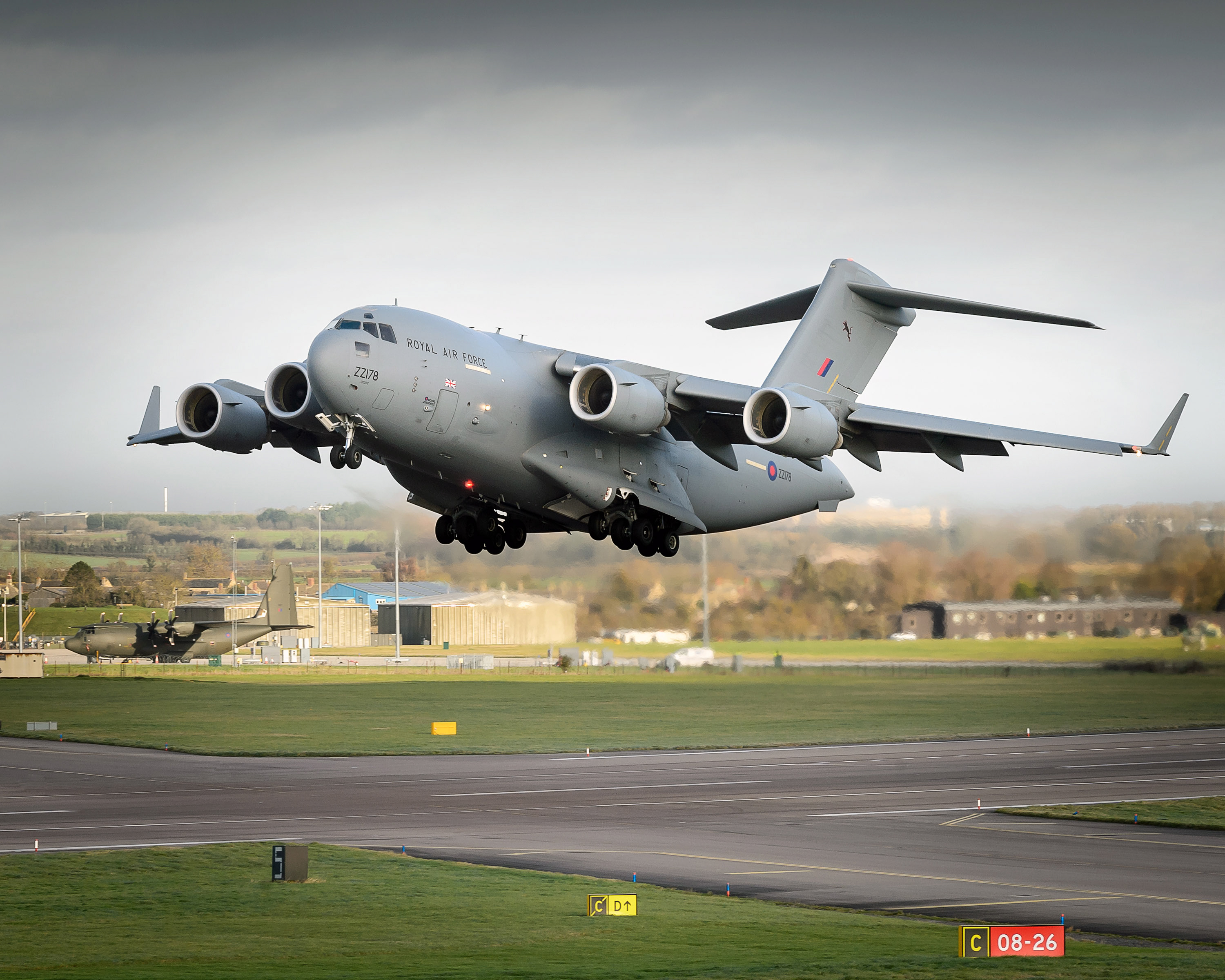
C-17A Globemaster III

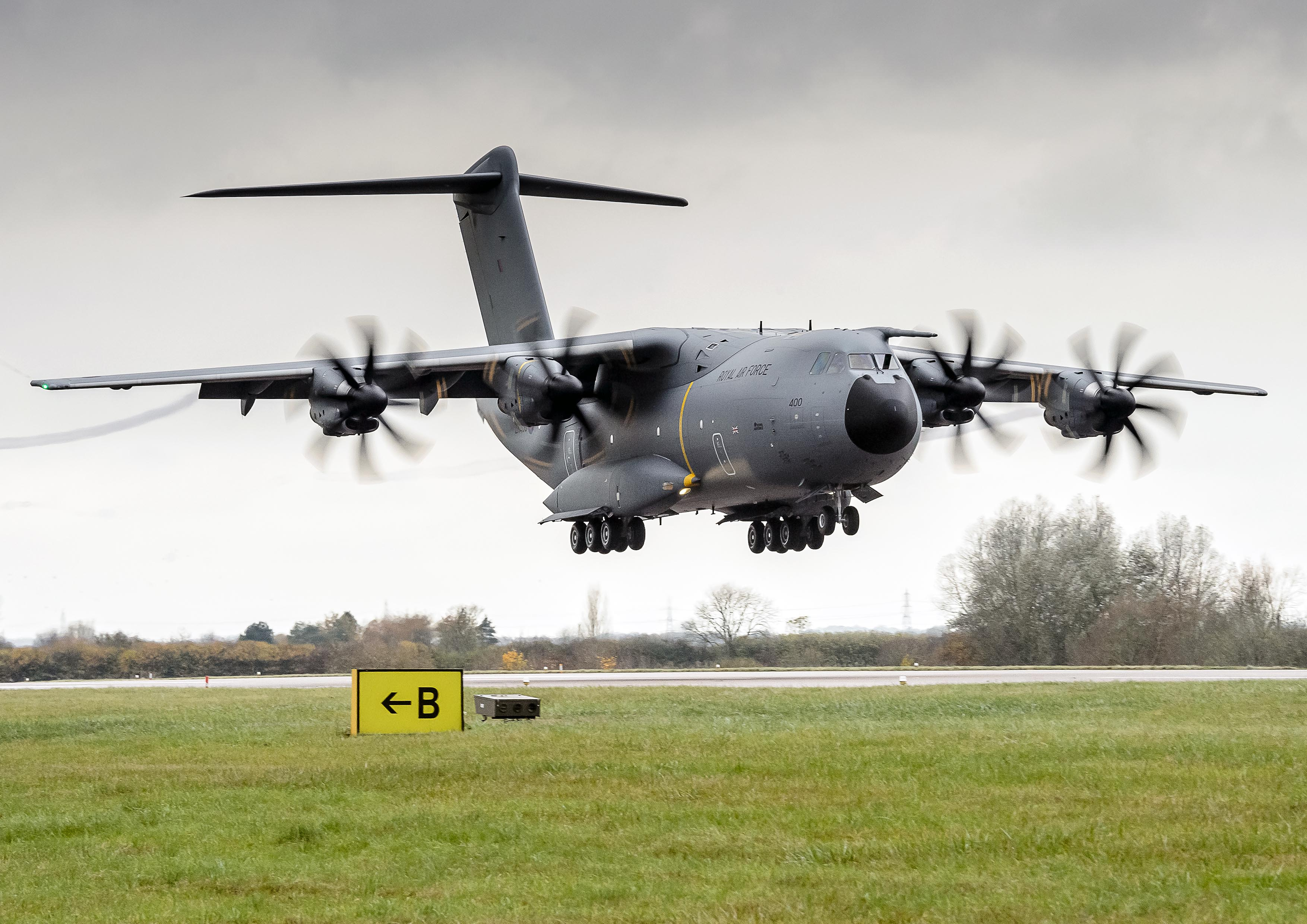
Atlas C1 (A400M)

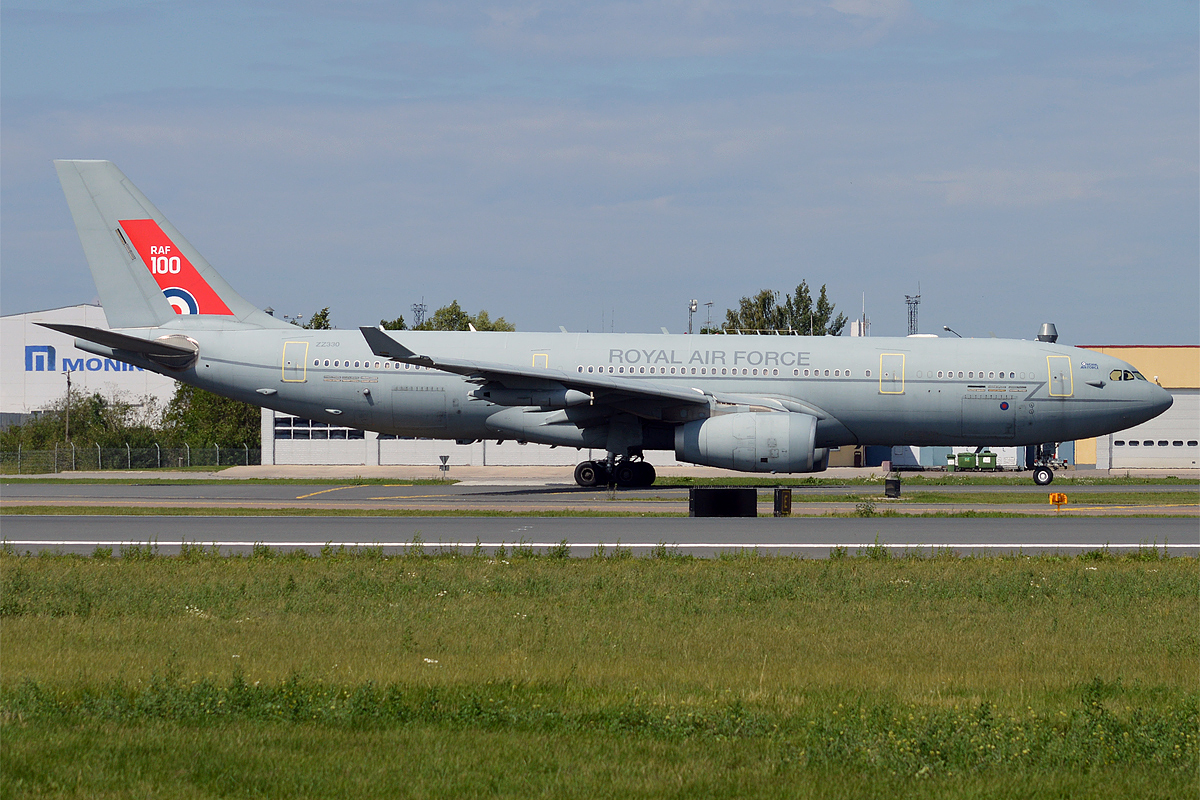
Voyager KC2 (A330 MRTT)

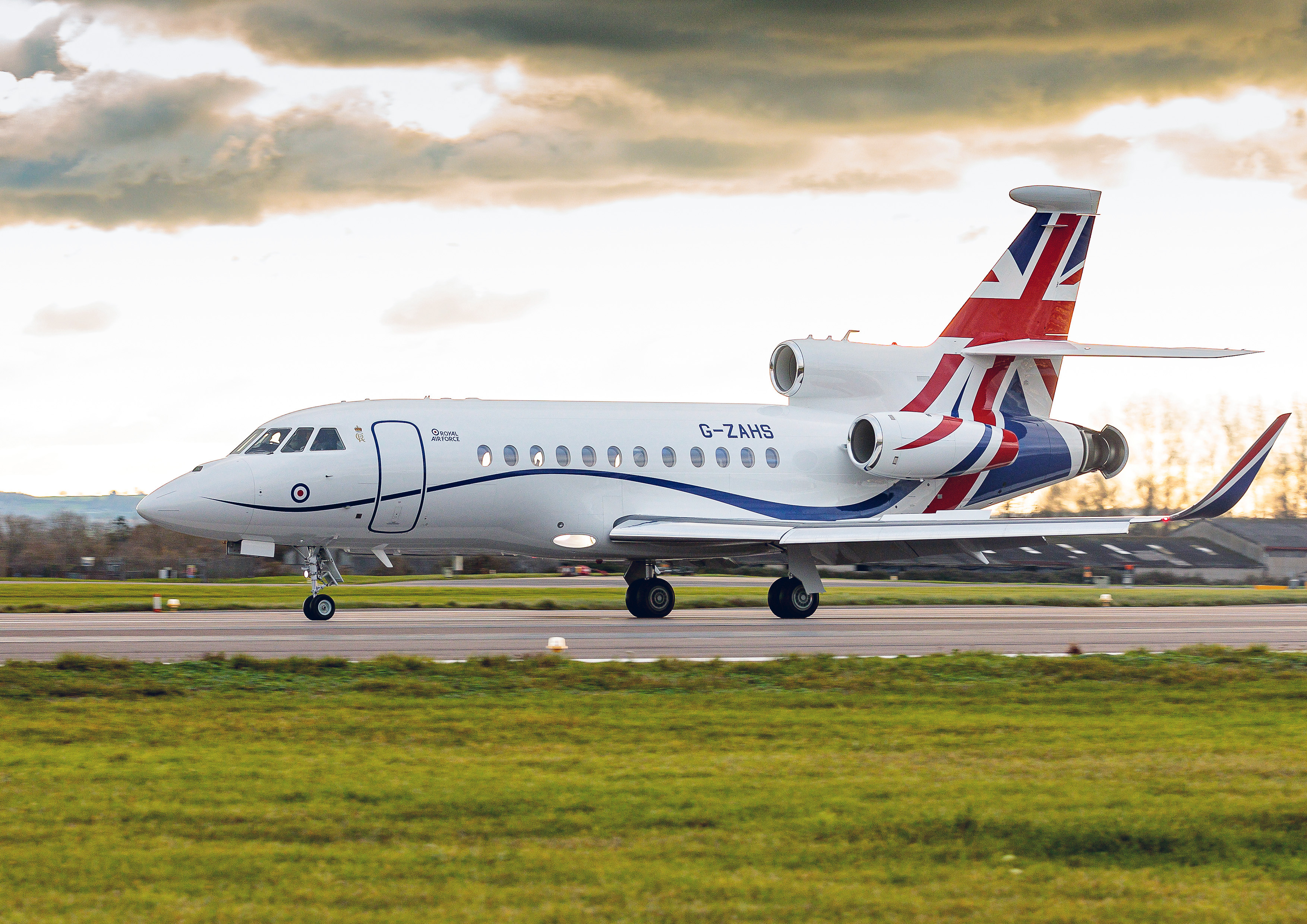
Envoy IV CC1

=== Helicopters ===
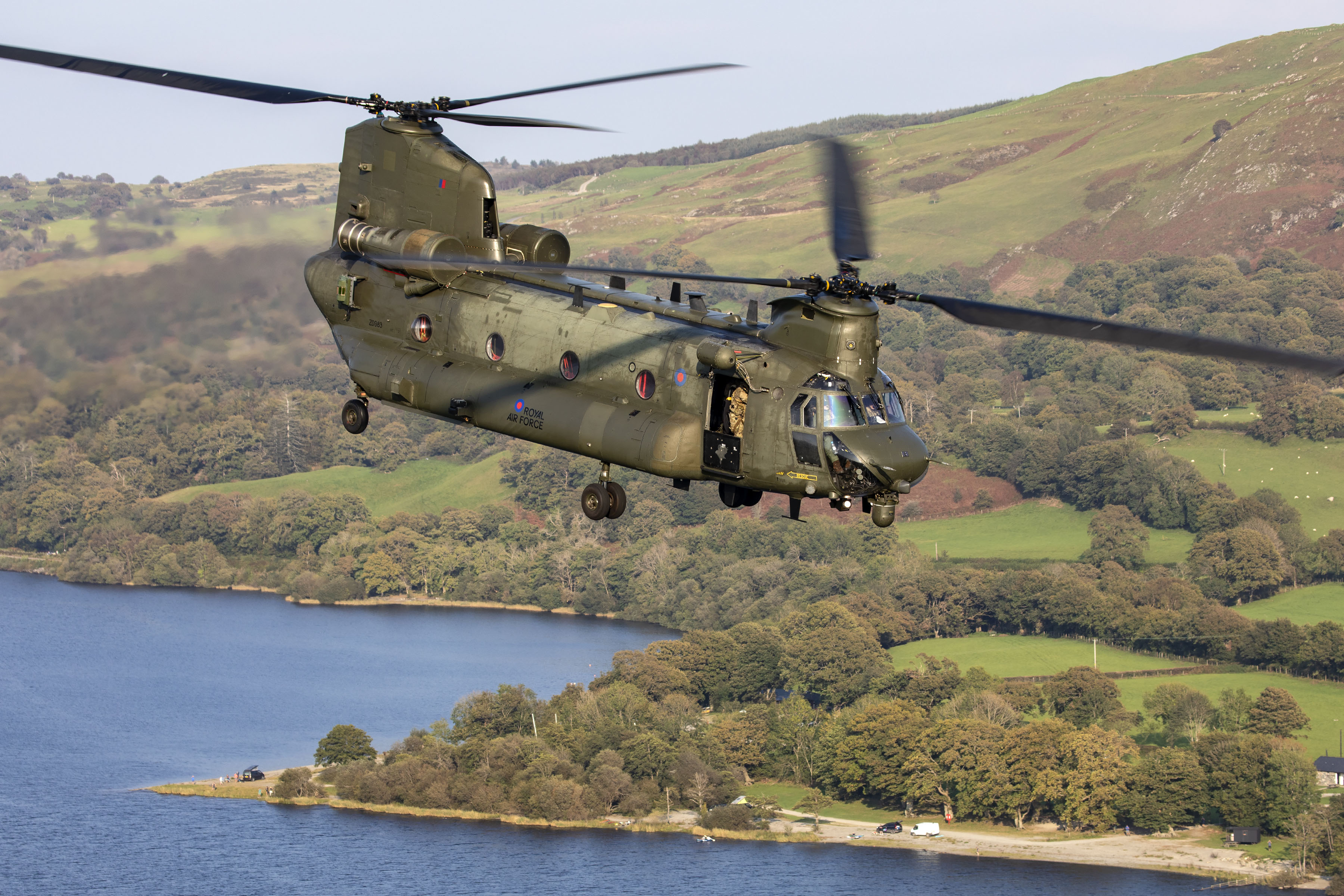
Boeing Chinook HC6A

Its helicopters support the British Army by moving troops and equipment to and around the battlefield. Helicopters are also used in a variety of other roles, including in support of its ground units and heavy-lift support for the Royal Marines. The support helicopters are organised into the tri-service Joint Aviation Command (JAC), along with helicopters from the British Army and Royal Navy. No. 22 Squadron, based at Benson, is the OEU for JAC.

==== Chinook HC5/HC6/HC6A ====
The large twin-rotor Boeing Chinook is the its heavy-lift support helicopter. Originally ordered in 1978, with subsequent orders in 1995, 2011, and 2018 (yet to be finalised), the Chinook is operated by No. 7 Squadron, No. 18 (B) Squadron and No. 27 Squadron at Odiham and No. 28 (AC) Squadron (Support Helicopter OCU) at Benson. Since being first delivered in 1980, the Chinook has been involved in numerous operations: the Falklands War (1982); Operation Granby (1991); Operation Engadine (1999); Operation Barras (2000); Operation Herrick (2002–2014); Operation Telic (2003–2011); Operation Ruman (2017); and Operation Newcombe (2018–2022). The 54-strong fleet of Chinooks currently has an OSD in the 2040s.

=== Training aircraft ===
The UK's military flying training has been privatised through a public-private partnership, known as the UK Military Flying Training System (UKMFTS). Training is provided by Ascent Flight Training, a consortium of Lockheed Martin and Babcock International. New aircraft were procured to reduce the training gap between the older generation Grob Tutor T1, Short Tucano T1 and Beechcraft King Air T1 aircraft, and the RAF's modern front-line aircraft, including advanced systems and glass cockpits. UKMFTS also relies far more on synthetic training to prepare aircrew for the front line, where advanced synthetic training is commonplace.

==== Initial training ====
The Grob Tutor T1 equips fifteen University Air Squadrons, which provide university students an opportunity to undertake a training syllabus, which includes first solo, as well as air navigation, aerobatics and formation flying. These units are co-located with Air Experience Flights, which share the same aircraft and facilities and provide air experience flying to the Air Training Corps and Combined Cadet Force. The Tutor is also flown by No. 16 Squadron and No. 115 Squadron based at Wittering.

Volunteer Gliding Squadrons also provide air experience flying to cadets using the Grob Viking T1 conventional glider. Due to an airworthiness issue in April 2014, the Viking fleet and the Grob Vigilant T1 fleet were grounded for a two-year period, although Viking operations have subsequently resumed. The Vigilant was unexpectedly withdrawn from service in May 2018, a year earlier than planned. A contract tender was initiated in February 2018 to replace this capability from 2022 onwards.

==== Elementary training ====
The Grob Prefect T1 was introduced to its service in 2016 as its elementary trainer. The 23-strong fleet is based at Cranwell and Barkston Heath in Lincolnshire where they are operated by No. 57 Squadron. On completion of elementary training, aircrew are then streamed to either fast jet, multi-engine, or rotary training.

==== Basic fast jet training ====
Basic fast jet training is provided on the Beechcraft Texan T1, which replaced the Short Tucano T1 in November 2019. The Texan is a tandem-seat turboprop aircraft, featuring a digital glass cockpit. It is operated by No. 72 (F) Squadron based at Valley in Anglesey which provides lead-in training and Royal Navy fighter pilots prior to advanced training on the BAE Hawk T2. The first two Texans were delivered in February 2018 and by December 2018 ten aircraft had arrived at Valley. Four additional Texans were delivered on 3 November 2020.

==== Advanced fast jet training ====
The BAE Hawk T2 is flown by No. IV Squadron and No. XXV (F) Squadron based at Valley. The latter provides initial Advanced Fast Jet Training (AFJT), while pilots who graduate on to the former squadron learn tactical and weapons training. After advanced training aircrew go on to an Operational Conversion Unit (OCU) where they are trained to fly either the Typhoon FGR4 (No. 29 Squadron at Coningsby) or F-35B Lightning (No. 207 Squadron at Marham) in preparation for service with a front-line squadron. The OCUs use operational aircraft alongside simulators and ground training, although in the case of the Typhoon a two-seater training variant exists which is designated the Typhoon T3.

On 15 October 2020, it was announced a joint Qatari Air Force Hawk squadron (similar to No. 12 Squadron) would be formed in the future. On 1 April 2021, it was further elaborated that this squadron would be stood up in September 2021 at Leeming, North Yorkshire. The Joint Hawk Training Squadron received its first two Hawk Mk.167s at Leeming on 1 September 2021. On 24 November 2021, the Joint Hawk Training Squadron became 11 Squadron QEAF when it reformed at Leeming.

==== Multi-engine training ====
Multi-Engine aircrew, weapon systems officer (WSO) and weapon systems operator (WSOp) students are trained on the Embraer Phenom T1. It is operated by No. 45 Squadron based at RAF Cranwell.

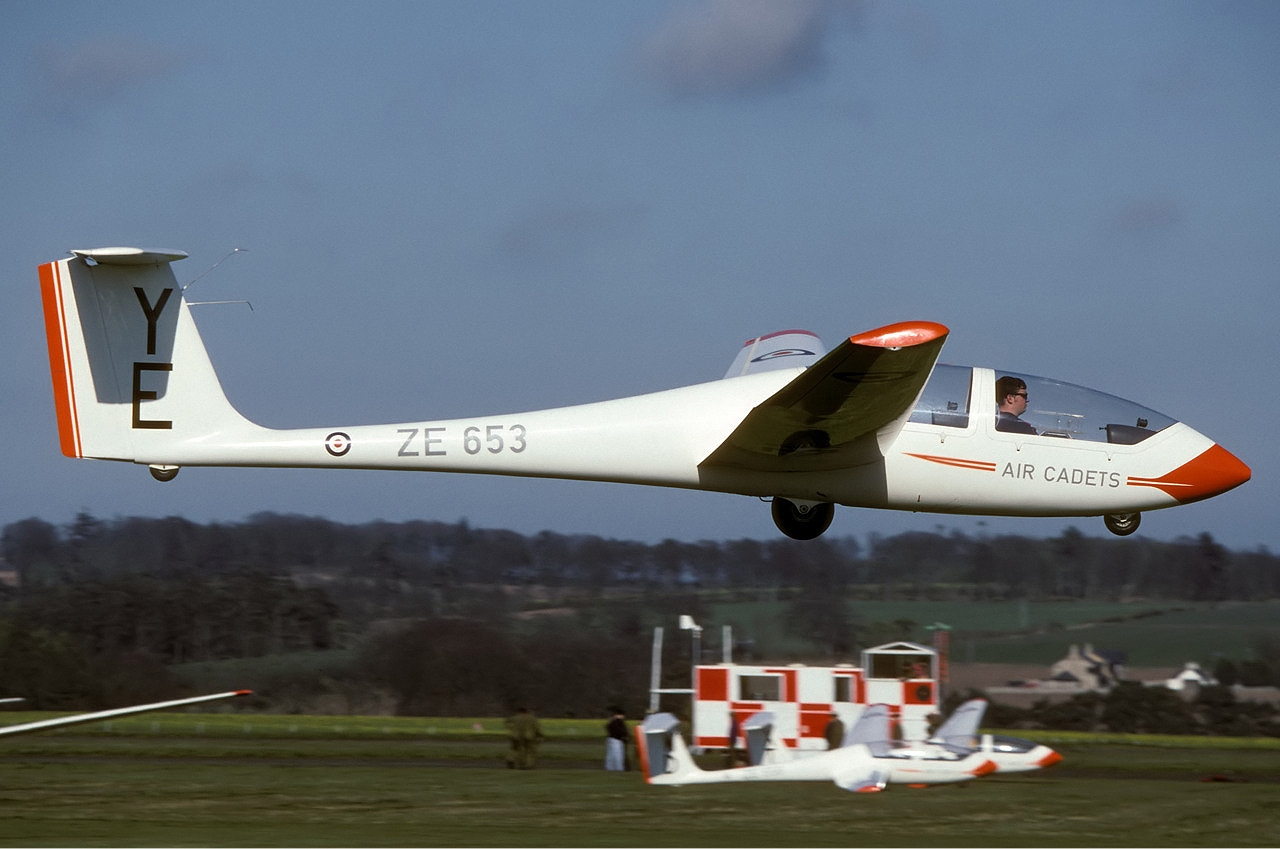
Viking T1

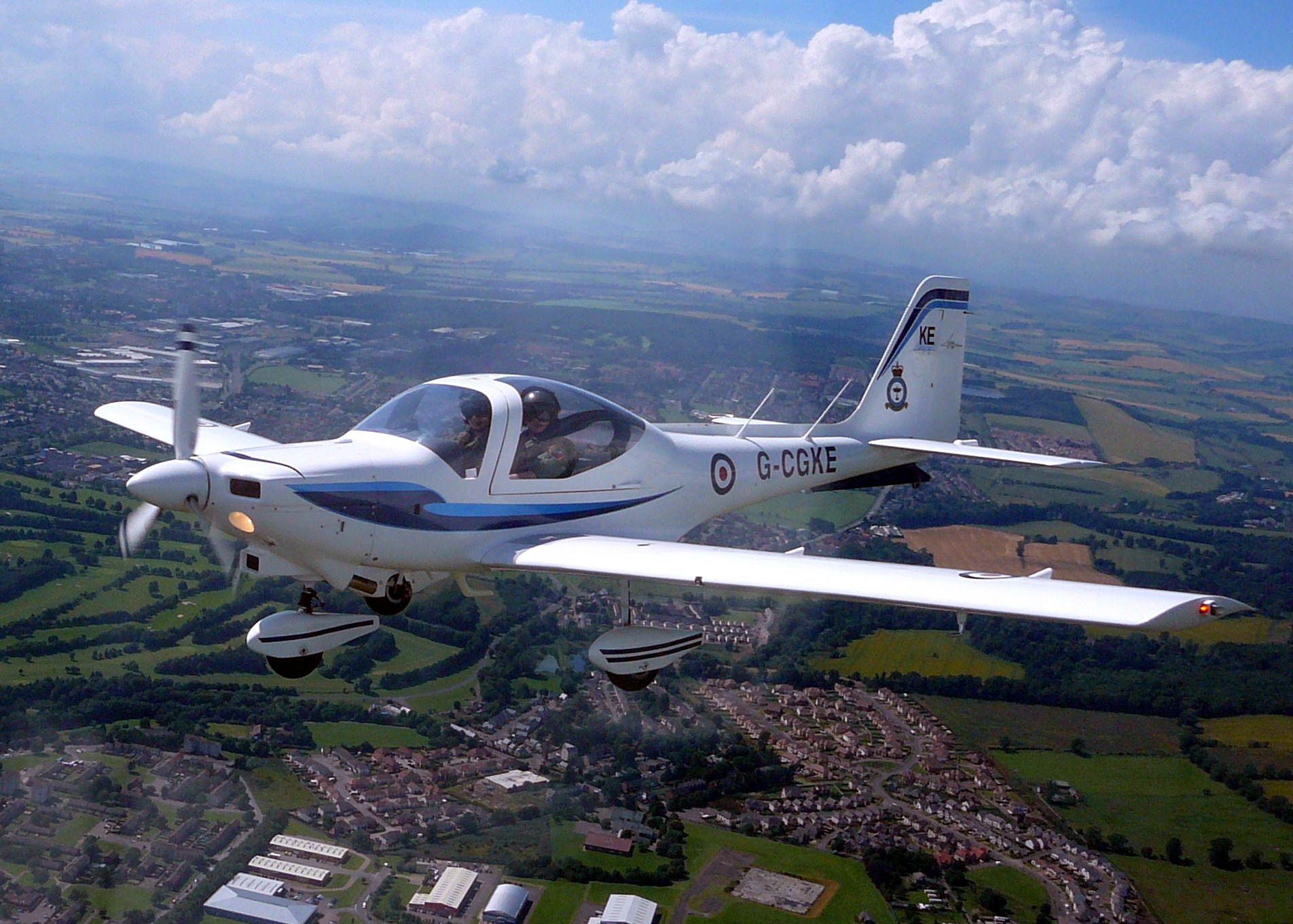
Tutor T1

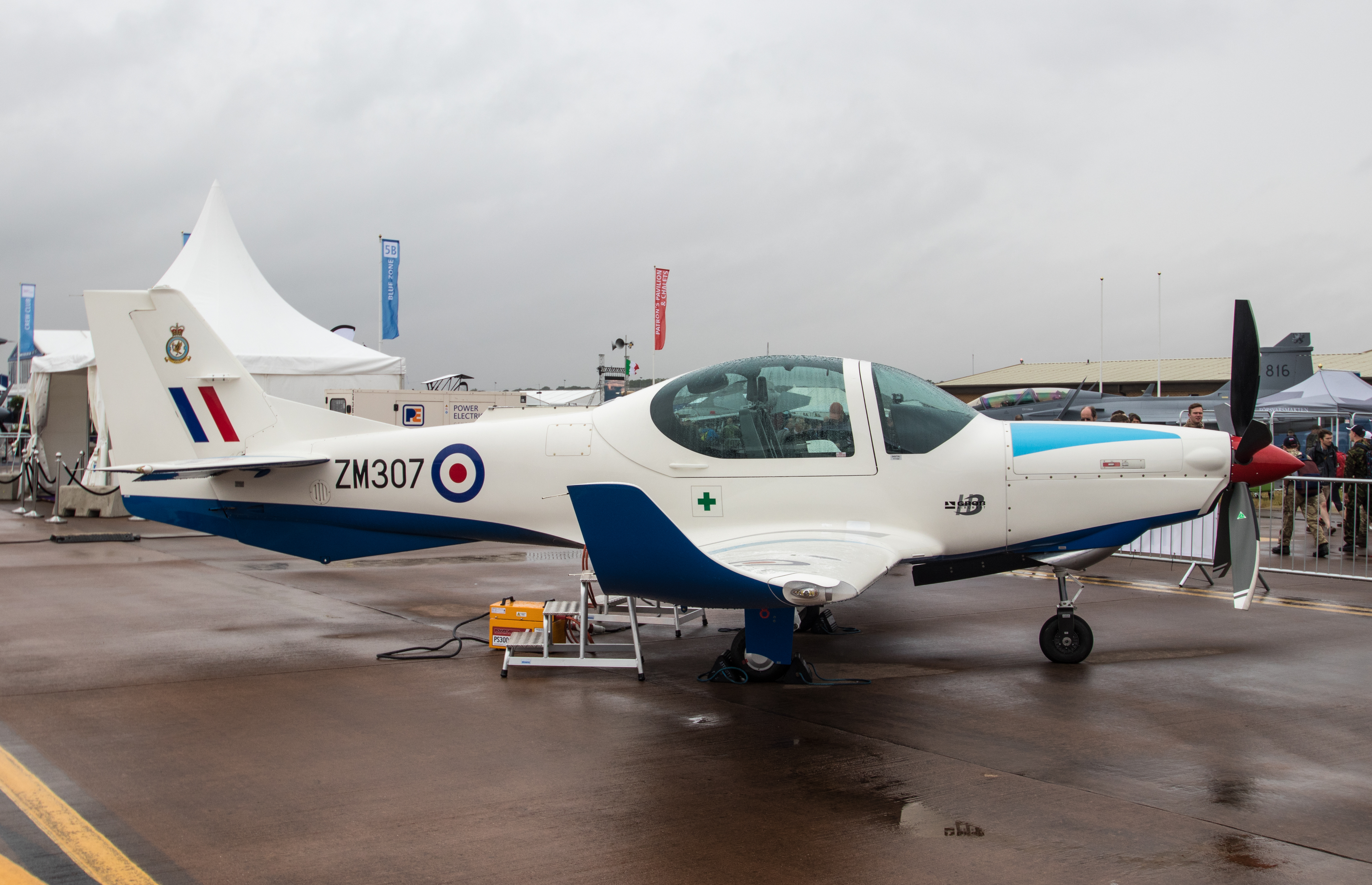
Prefect T1

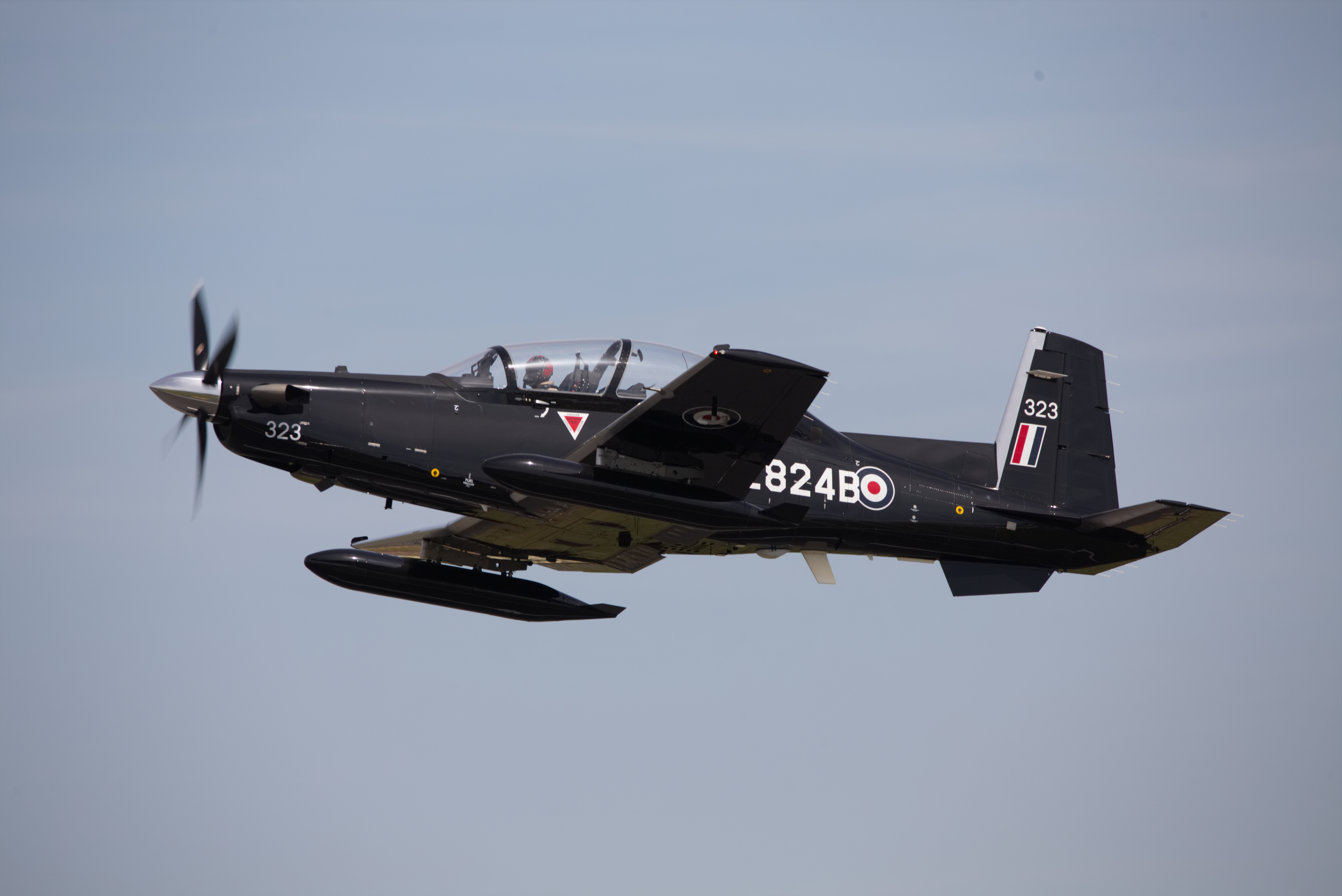
Texan T1

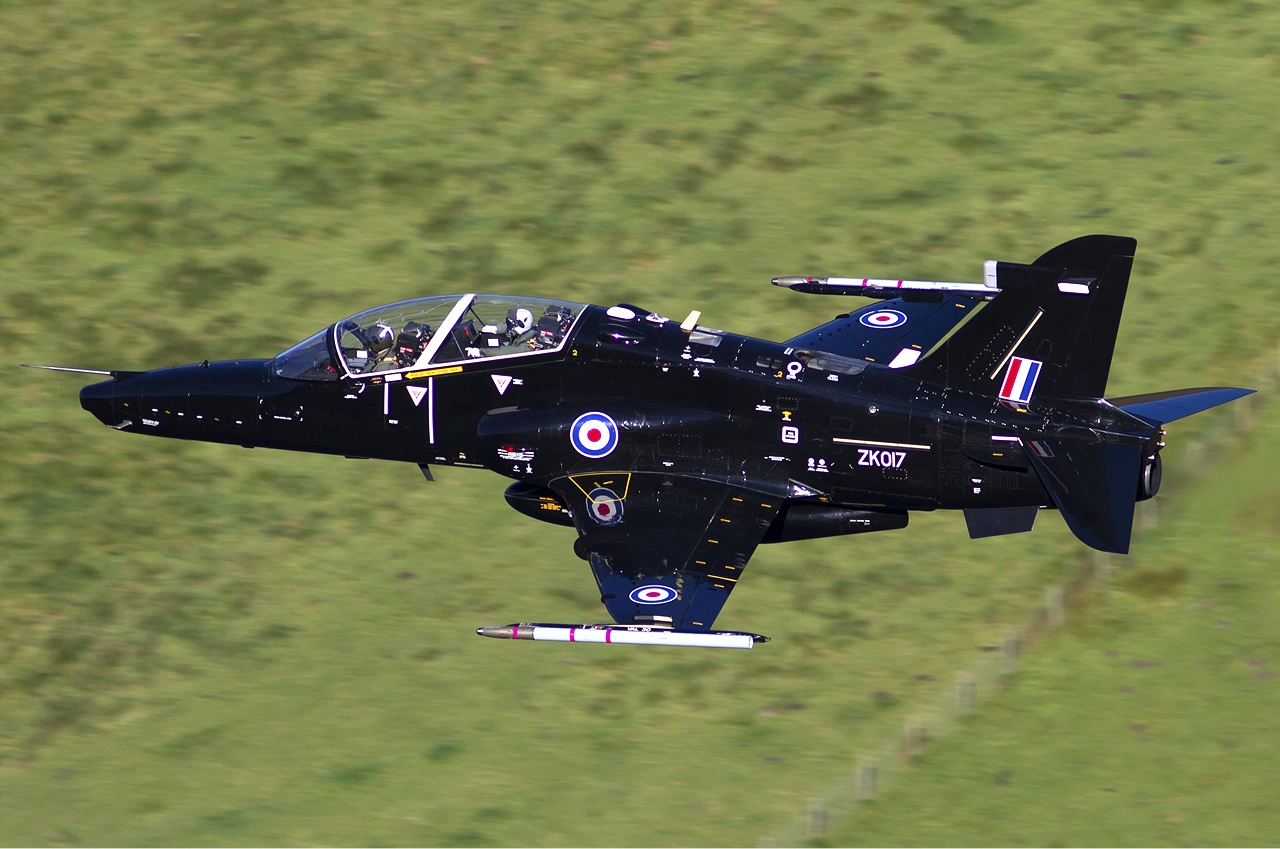
Hawk T2

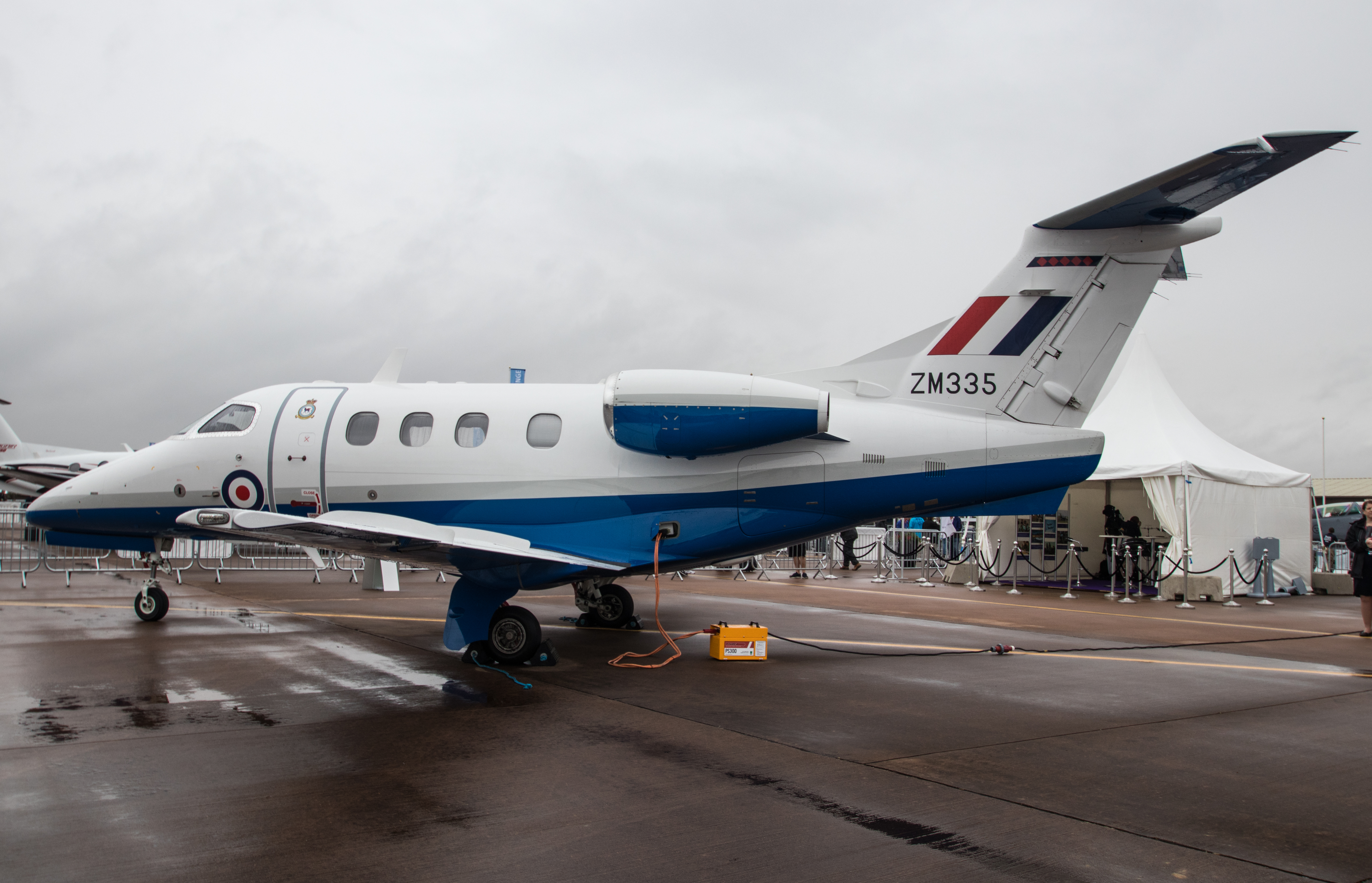
Phenom T1

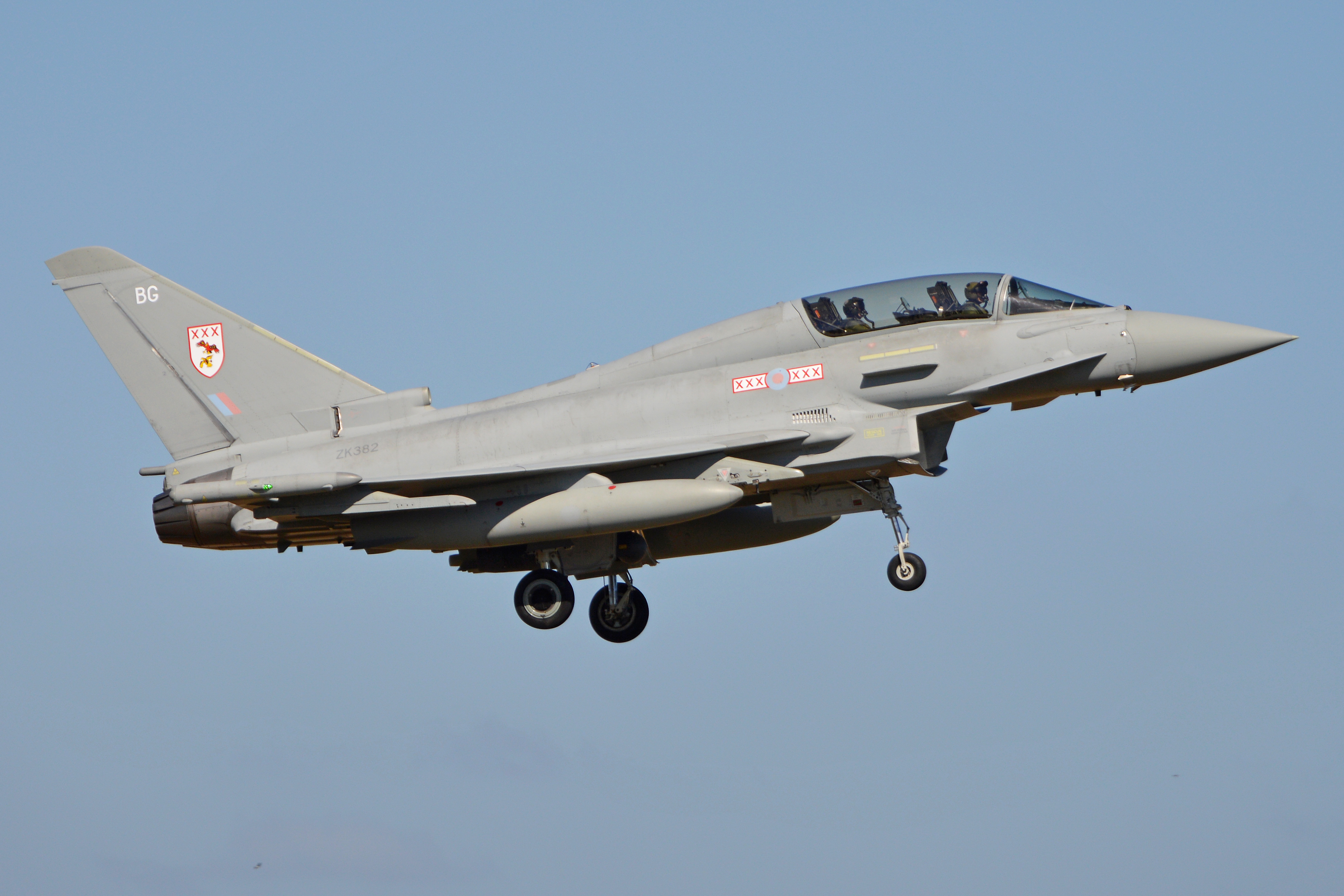
Typhoon T3

==== Rotary Training ====
No. 1 Flying Training School (No. 1 FTS) (formerly the Defence Helicopter Flying School) is based at Shawbury in Shropshire and provides basic helicopter pilot training for all UK armed forces. It flies twenty-nine Airbus Juno HT1. No. 1 FTS comprises two main elements, 2 Maritime Air Wing (2 MAW) and No. 9 Regiment. 2 MAW includes No. 660 Squadron of the Army Air Corps (AAC) and 705 Naval Air Squadron and provide basic helicopter flying training. No. 9 Regiment comprises No. 60 Squadron of the RAF and No. 670 Squadron of the AAC in the advanced helicopter flying training. No. 202 Squadron is also part of No. 1 FTS and operates the Airbus Jupiter HT1 at Valley.

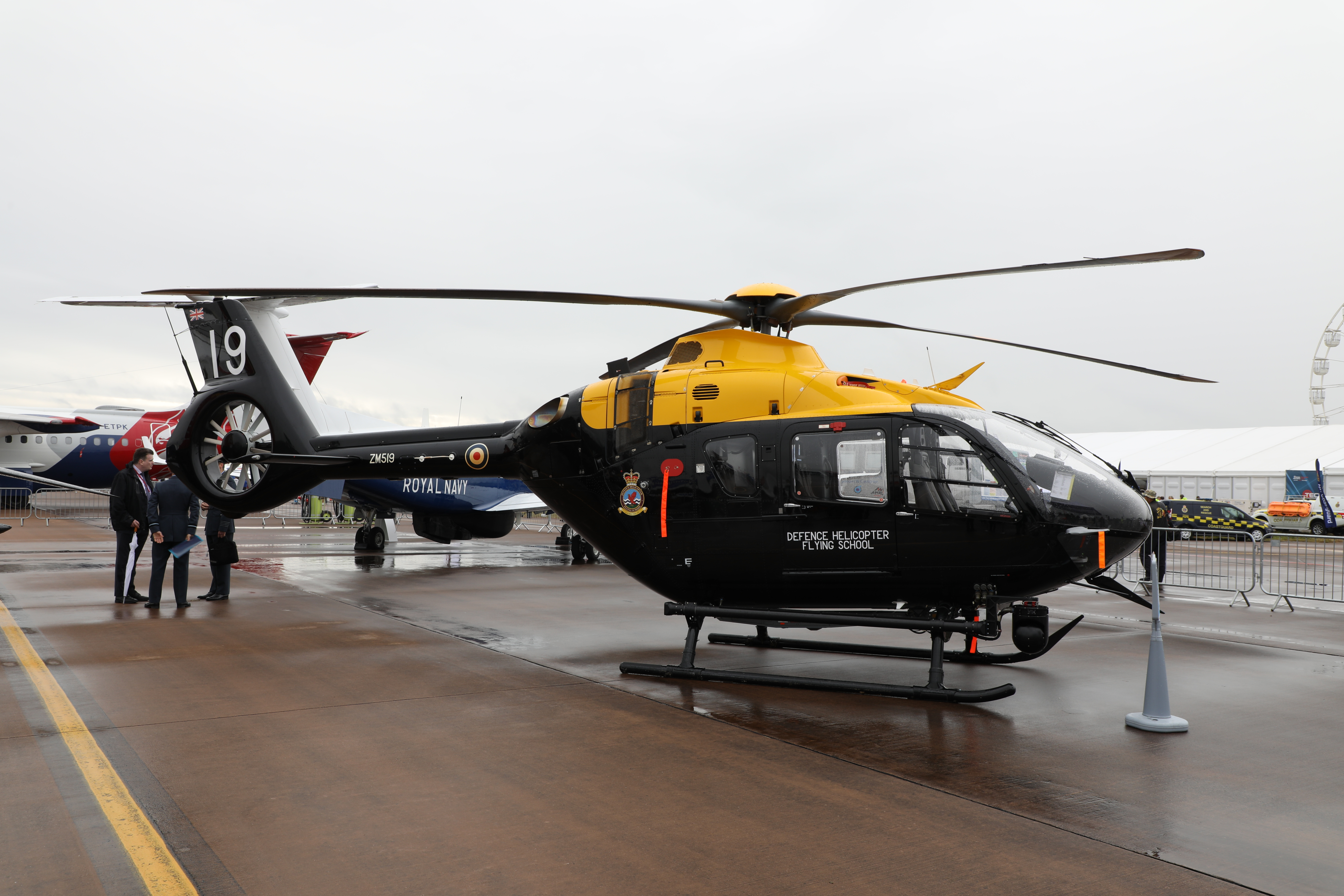
Juno HT1

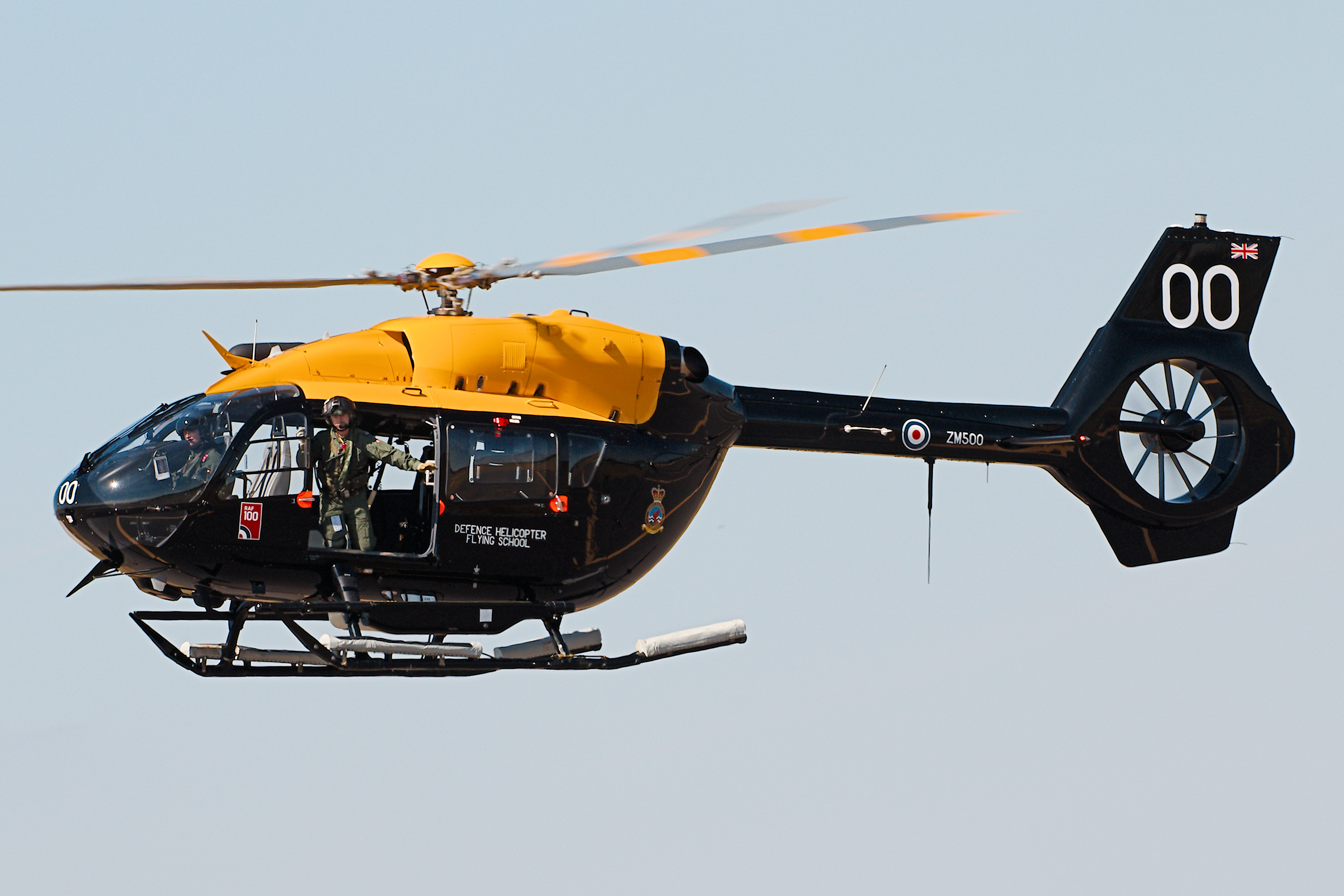
Jupiter HT1

=== Future aircraft ===
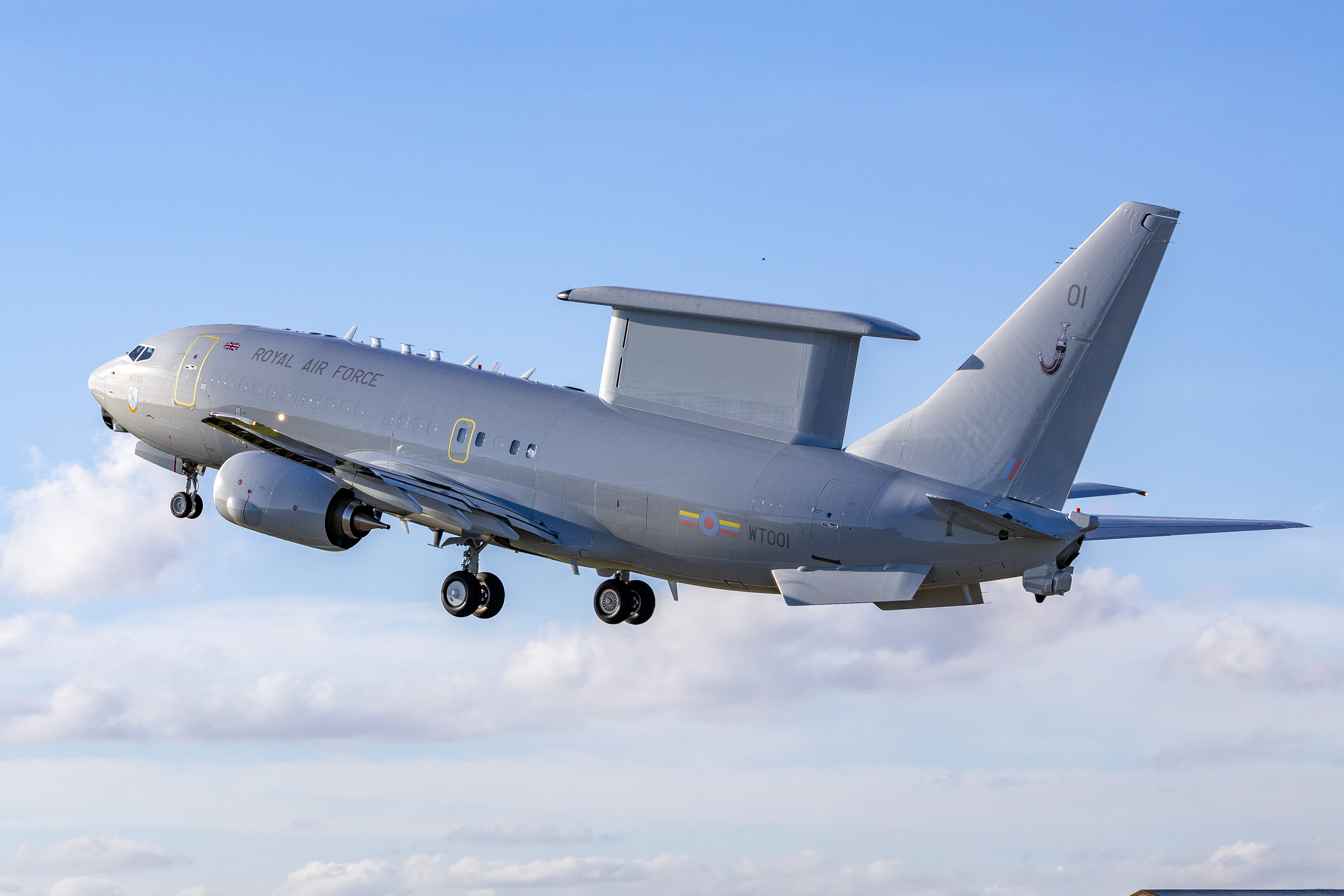
A Boeing E-7 Wedgetail of the Royal Air Force (November 2024)

In July 2014, the House of Commons Defence Select Committee released a report on the future force structure that envisaged a mixture of unmanned and manned platforms, including further F-35, Protector RG1, a service life extension for the Typhoon (which would otherwise end its service in 2030) or a possible new manned aircraft. In July 2018, at the Farnborough Airshow, the Defence Secretary announced a £2bn investment for BAE Systems, MBDA and Leonardo to develop a new British 6th Generation Fighter to replace Typhoon in 2035 under Project Tempest.

On 22 March 2019, the defence secretary announced the UK had signed a $1.98 billion deal to procure five Boeing E-7 Wedgetails to replace the ageing Boeing E-3D Sentry AEW1 fleet in the Airborne Early Warning and Control (AEW&C) role. As of May 2020, the first E-7 is expected to enter its service in 2023 with the final aircraft arriving in late 2025 or early 2026. In December 2020, it was announced that the Wedgetail AEW1 will be based at Lossiemouth. The 2021 Defence Command Paper cut the Wedgetail order down to three aircraft. The Sentry AEW1s were officially withdrawn on 28 September 2021. This left a prolonged capability gap since, by 2025, the in-service date for Wedgetail had slipped into 2026.

==== Medium Helicopter programme ====
The Medium Helicopter (NMH) programme was announced in the 2021 Defence and Security Industrial Strategy as a plan to replace several ageing rotary-wing aircraft operated by the British Armed Forces. In May 2022 the Ministry of Defence launched a competition for up to 44 helicopters.

By November 2022, four manufacturers had entered proposals: Airbus Helicopters with the Airbus H175M, Boeing with the MH-139 Grey Wolf, Leonardo with the Leonardo AW149, and Sikorsky with the Sikorsky UH-60 Black Hawk. Boeing’s proposal did not proceed to the final stage of the competition, while Airbus and Lockheed Martin (representing Sikorsky) later withdrew their bids in 2024.

On 2 March 2026, the Ministry of Defence confirmed the selection of the AW149 to fulfil the NMH requirement. The initial contract provided for 23 helicopters, replacing the Puma HC2 fleet on a one-for-one basis following its retirement in March 2025. The aircraft will assume the medium-lift transport role previously carried out by the Puma force, which had been operated by No. 33 Squadron and No. 230 Squadron from RAF Benson.

== Symbols, flags, emblems and uniform ==
Royal Air Force Ensign

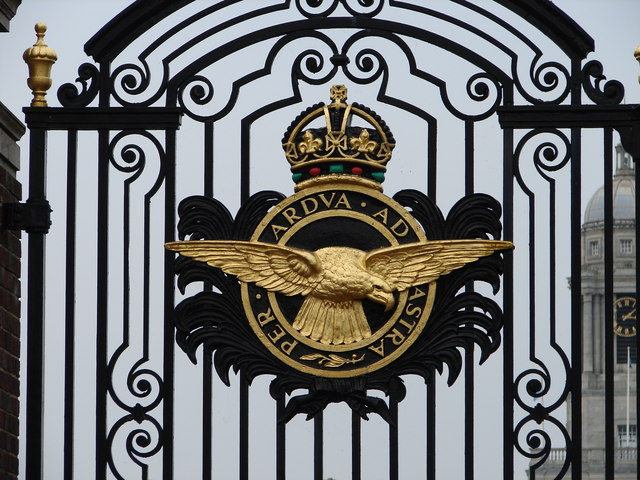
The badge of the Royal Air Force on the gates of RAF College Cranwell

Following the tradition of the other British armed services, it has adopted symbols to represent it, use as rallying devices for members and promote esprit de corps. British aircraft in the early stages of the First World War carried the Union Flag as an identifying feature; however, this was easily confused with Germany's Iron Cross motif. In October 1914, therefore, the French system of three concentric rings was adopted, with the colours reversed to a red disc surrounded by a white ring and an outer blue ring. The relative sizes of the rings have changed over the years and during the Second World War an outer yellow ring was added to the fuselage roundel. Aircraft serving in the Far East during the Second World War had the red disc removed to prevent confusion with Japanese aircraft. Since the 1970s, camouflaged aircraft carry low-visibility roundels, either red and blue on dark camouflage, or washed-out pink and light blue on light colours. Most non-camouflaged training and transport aircraft retain the traditional red-white-blue roundel.

Its motto is Per Ardua ad Astra and is usually translated from Latin as "Through Adversity to the Stars", but its official translation is "Through Struggle to the Stars". The choice of motto is attributed to a junior officer named J S Yule, in response to a request for suggestions from a commander of the Royal Flying Corps, Colonel Sykes.

The badge of the Royal Air Force was first used in August 1918. In heraldic terms, it is: "In front of a circle inscribed with the motto Per Ardua ad Astra and ensigned by the Imperial Crown an eagle volant and affronté head lowered and to the sinister". Although there have been debates among airmen over the years about whether the bird was originally meant to be an albatross or an eagle, the consensus is that it was always an eagle.

== Ceremonial functions and display ==
=== Red Arrows ===
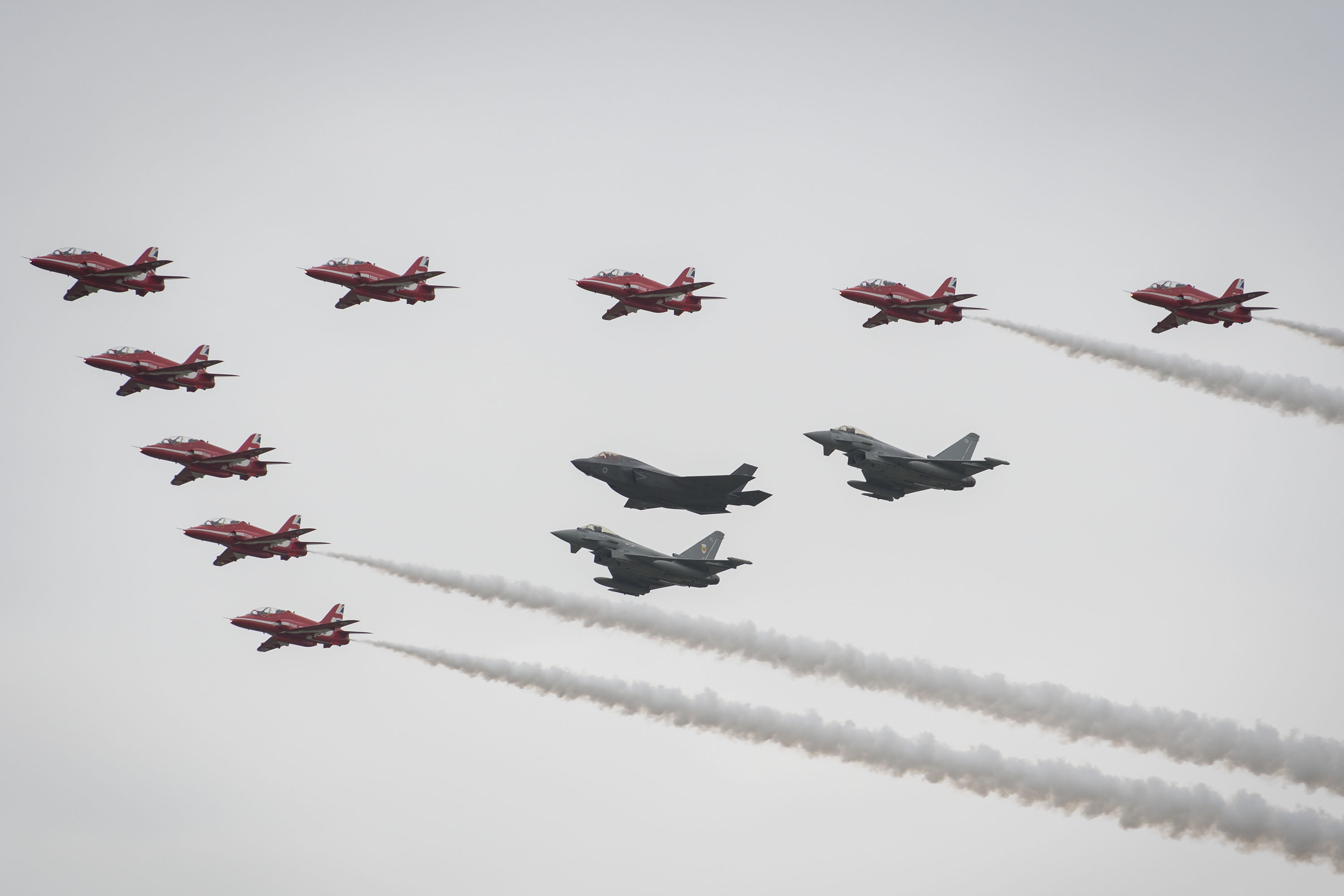
The Red Arrows in formation with an F-35B and a pair of Typhoons at the Royal International Air Tattoo in 2016

The Red Arrows, officially known as the Royal Air Force Aerobatic Team, is the aerobatics display team of the Royal Air Force based at Waddington. The team was formed in late 1964 as an all-star team, replacing a number of unofficial teams that had been sponsored by commands. The Red Arrows badge shows the aircraft in their trademark Diamond Nine formation, with the motto Éclat, a French word meaning "brilliance" or "excellence".

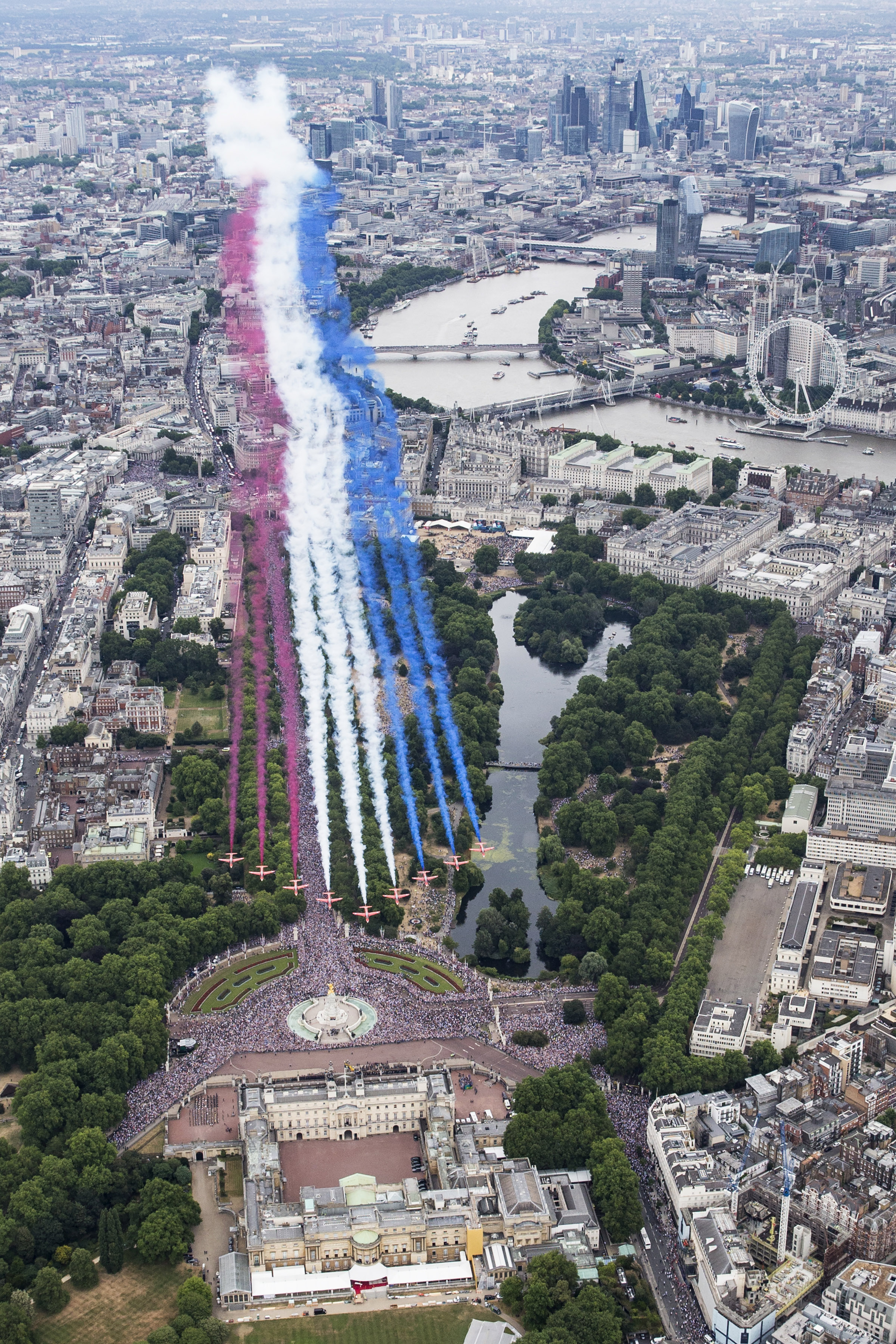
The Red Arrows flying over London in 2018 during the RAF centenary celebrations

Initially, they were equipped with seven Folland Gnat trainers inherited from the RAF Yellowjacks display team. This aircraft was chosen because it was less expensive to operate than front-line fighters. In their first season, they flew at sixty-five shows across Europe. In 1966, the team was increased to nine members, enabling them to develop their Diamond Nine formation. In late 1979, they switched to the BAE Hawk trainer. The Red Arrows have performed more than 4,700 displays in fifty-six countries worldwide.

=== Battle of Britain Memorial Flight ===
The Battle of Britain Memorial Flight (BBMF) is a Royal Air Force unit providing that operates historic aircraft from WW2 era for ceremonial and commemoration purposes. Formed in 1957, BBMF comprises Spitfire and Hurricane fighters to represent the main types that fought in the Battle of Britain, but also an Avro Lancaster to commemorate Bomber Command and a Dakota to commemorate airborne forces contribution. The aircraft are regularly seen at events commemorating the Second World War and upon British State occasions, notably Trooping the Colour, Royal Weddings, key Royal Birthdays and Jubilee ceremonies.

=== King's Colour Squadron, Royal Air Force Regiment ===
The King's Colour Squadron is the unit of the Royal Air Force charged with the safe-keeping of the King's Colour for the Royal Air Force in the United Kingdom and the only dedicated Ceremonial drill unit of the RAF. Since its formation, it has been formed exclusively by Officers and Gunners of No. 63 Squadron Regiment. KCS, as its known, is task with representing the UK and State and Ceremonial events (such as Remembrance Day at the Cenotaph, opening of Parliament and repatriation ceremonies). They also mount a guard a Buckingham Palace, Windsor Castle and the Tower of London, in place of the Army's Brigade of Guards each year.

=== Royal Air Force Music ===
Headquarters Royal Air Force Music Services, located at Northolt, supports professional musicians who perform at events around the globe in support of its goals. The Central Band of the Royal Air Force was established in 1920. Other bands include the Band of the Royal Air Force College, the Band of the Royal Air Force Regiment and the Band of the Royal Auxiliary Air Force.

=== Trooping the Colour ===
The Royal Air Force, and its predecessor, the Royal Flying Corps, has provided the flypast for Trooping the Colour since 1913. The RFC performed its first flypast for King George V's Official Birthday over Laffin's Plain, Aldershot.

== See also ==
- List of all aircraft current and former of the United Kingdom
- List of military aircraft operational during World War II
- List of Royal Air Force stations
- Structure of the Royal Air Force
- Royal Air Force Air Cadets
- Royal Air Force Museum
- RAF News

== Sources ==
- Aloni, Shlomo (2001). Arab–Israeli Air Wars 1947–82. London: Osprey. ISBN 978-1-84176-294-4.
- Biddle, Tami Davis (2002). Rhetoric and Reality in Air Warfare: The Evolution of British and American Ideas about Strategic Bombing, 1914–1945. Princeton: Princeton University Press. ISBN 978-1-4008-2497-7.
- Bowyer, Chaz (1980). History of the RAF. London: Allen. ISBN 978-0-7110-1005-5.
- Dean, Maurice (1979). The Royal Air Force and Two World Wars. London: Cassell.
- Connolly, Corvin J. (2001). Marshal of the Royal Air Force Sir John Cotesworth Slessor and the Anglo-American Air Power Alliance, 1940–1945. Texas A&M Press.
- Cox, Jafna L. (1985). "A splendid training ground: the importance to the Royal Air Force of its role in Iraq, 1919–32". Journal of Imperial and Commonwealth History. 13 (2): 157–184.
- Davis, Richard B. (2006). Bombing the European Axis Powers: A Historical Digest of the Combined Bomber Offensive 1939–1945. Air University Press. Archived from the original on 21 December 2016.
- Gooderson, Ian (2013). Air Power at the Battlefront: Allied Close Air Support in Europe 1943–45. Routledge.
- Heaton, Colin D.; Lewis, Anne-Marie (2008). Night Fighters: Luftwaffe and RAF Air Combat Over Europe, 1939–1945. Naval Institute Press.
- Heyman, Charles (2013). The Armed Forces of the United Kingdom (2014–2015). Barnsley: Pen and Sword. ISBN 978-1-78346-351-0.
- Hoffman, Bruce (1989). British Air Power in Peripheral Conflict, 1919–1976 (PDF) (Report). RAND. Archived from the original on 28 July 2020.
- International Institute for Strategic Studies (2010). Hackett, James (ed.). The Military Balance 2010. London: Routledge. ISBN 978-1-85743-557-3.
- International Institute for Strategic Studies (2012). Hackett, James (ed.). The Military Balance 2012. London: Routledge. ISBN 978-1-85743-642-6.
- Lee, David (1984). Eastward: A History of the Royal Air Force in the Far East, 1945–1972. Seven Hills Books.
- Lee, David (1980). Flight from the Middle East: A History of the Royal Air Force in the Arabian Peninsula and Adjacent Territories, 1945–1972. HM Stationery Office.
- Maiolo, Joseph (2010). Cry Havoc: How the Arms Race Drove the World to War, 1931–1941.
- Miller, Russell (2016). Boom: The Life of Viscount Trenchard, Father of the Royal Air Force. Weidenfeld. ISBN 978-0-297-87105-7.
- Philpott, Ian, ed. (2008). Royal Air Force History: Royal Air Force – an Encyclopaedia of the Inter-War Years. Vol. 1–2.
- Rawlings, John D. R. (1984). The History of the Royal Air Force.
- Richards, Denis; Pilgrim, David (1954). Royal Air Force, 1939–1945: The Fight at Odds.
- Ritchie, Sebastian (2011). The RAF, Small Wars and Insurgencies: Later Colonial Operations, 1945–1975 (Report).
- Robertson, Bruce (1967). Aircraft Markings of the World 1912–1967. London: Harleyford. ISBN 978-0-900435-09-6.
- Saunders, Hilary (1945). Per Ardua: The Rise of British Air Power, 1911–1939. Oxford UP.
- Sinnott, Colin S. (2014). The RAF and Aircraft Design: Air Staff Operational Requirements 1923–1939. Routledge.
- Smith, Malcolm (1984). British Air Strategy Between the Wars. Oxford: The Clarendon Press.
- Smith, Gordon Scott (1966). RAF War Plans and British Foreign Policy 1935–1940 (Thesis). MIT Dept. of Political Science.
- Spencer, Alex M. (2020). British Imperial Air Power: The Royal Air Forces and the Defense of Australia and New Zealand Between the World Wars. Indiana: Purdue University Press. ISBN 978-1-55753-940-3.
- Werrell, Kenneth P. (1986). "The strategic bombing of Germany in World War II: Costs and accomplishments". Journal of American History. 73 (3): 702–713. JSTOR 1902984.
