= Dis =

Dis, DIS or variants may refer to:

== Arts and entertainment ==
=== Music ===
- Dis (album), by Jan Garbarek, 1976
- Dís, a soundtrack album by Jóhann Jóhannsson, 2004
- "Dis", a song by The Gazette from the 2003 album Hankou Seimeibun
- "dis–", music from Mika Arisaka from the anime series Infinite Ryvius

=== Other uses in arts and entertainment ===
- DIS (collective), a collaborative art project, and their DIS Magazine
- Drowned in Sound (DiS), a British webzine
- Dis – en historie om kjærlighet, or A Story About Love, a 1995 Norwegian film
- Dis, translated as In a Dark Wood, a 2006 Dutch novel by Marcel Möring

== Businesses and organisations ==
- The Walt Disney Company, NYSE stock symbol DIS
  - Disney Interactive Studios, a defunct video game developer and publisher
- Daegu International School, in South Korea
- Dili International School, in East Timor
- Dubai International School, in the United Arab Emirates
- Dominican International School, in Taipei, Taiwan

== Government and military ==
- Defence Intelligence Staff, a former British government agency
- Defence Industrial Strategy, a British government policy
- Defense Investigative Service, a former American government agency
- Digital and Intelligence Service, a service branch of the Singapore Armed Forces
- Dipartimento delle Informazioni per la Sicurezza (Department of Information Security), an Italian intelligence agency
- Directorate of Intelligence and Security, a Botswanan intelligence agency
- Mikoyan-Gurevich DIS, a Soviet military plane

== People ==
- Vladislav Petković Dis (1880–1917), Serbian poet
- Désiré Keteleer (1920–1970), or "Dis" Keteleer, a Belgian cyclist
- D. I. Suchianu (1895–1985), or "D.I.S.", Romanian social scientist and film critic

== Places ==
- Ad Dis, Yemen
  - Ad Dis district

== Religion and mythology ==
- Dīs Pater, a Roman god of the underworld
  - Dis (Divine Comedy), a fictional city that contains the lower circles of hell
- Dís, female spirit or goddess associated with fate in Norse mythology

== Science and technology ==
- Dis virtual machine, that executes Limbo code
- Draft International Standard, a stage in standardization process of the International Organization for Standardization
- Distributed Interactive Simulation, a standard for conducting wargaming across multiple computers
- DIS, a system with a dedicated, discrete graphics processing unit
- Deep inelastic scattering, a kind of scattering process in particle physics

== Transportation ==
- Disneyland Resort station, Hong Kong, MTR station code DIS
- Diss railway station, South Norfolk, England, National Rail station code DIS
- Dolisie Airport, Republic of the Congo, IATA airport code DIS

== Other uses ==
- Diš (cuneiform), with various meanings
- Dis (skipper), a genus of butterflies
- Ampelodesmos mauritanicus, Maltese name for plant species
- Dís, the Ancient Greek term for two

== See also ==
- Diss (disambiguation)
- Diz Disley (1931–2010), Anglo-Canadian jazz guitarist and graphic designer
