= British Armed Forces =

Combined military forces of the United Kingdom

- Badge of the Ministry of Defence

- Flag of the Ministry of Defence
- Founded: 1546; 480 years ago (Royal Navy); 1660; 366 years ago (British Army); 1918; 108 years ago (Royal Air Force)
- Service branches: HM Naval Service; Royal Navy; Royal Marines; British Army; Royal Air Force
- Headquarters: Ministry of Defence, London

Leadership
- Head of the Armed Forces: King Charles III
- Prime Minister: Andy Burnham
- Secretary of State for Defence: Wes Streeting
- Chief of the Defence Staff: Air Chief Marshal Sir Rich Knighton
- Vice-Chief of the Defence Staff: General Dame Sharon Nesmith
- Senior Enlisted Advisor to the Chiefs of Staff Committee: Warrant Officer Class 1 Sarah Cox

Personnel
- Military age: 16–17 (with parental consent); 18 (without and to serve in combat)
- Conscription: No (Note: National Service ended in 1960, though periods of deferred service still had to be completed. The last national servicemen were discharged in 1963.)
- Active personnel: 137,970 regular forces personnel (April 2026); 4,460 Gurkhas (April 2026)
- Reserve personnel: 32,030 volunteer reserve personnel (April 2026)

Expenditure
- Budget: £68.3 billion (2026/27) (~US$92.4 billion)
- Percent of GDP: 2.58% (2026)

Industry
- Domestic suppliers: Babcock International; BAE Systems; MBDA; Qinetiq; Rolls-Royce Holdings; Serco
- Foreign suppliers: United States; Israel; South Korea; Germany; France; Netherlands; Sweden; Spain; Finland; Canada; Norway
- Annual imports: $568.1 million (2014–2022)
- Annual exports: $1.074 billion (2014–2022)

Related articles
- History: Military history of the United Kingdom; Warfare directory of the United Kingdom; Conflicts involving the United Kingdom; Battles involving the United Kingdom
- Ranks: Officer ranks; Navy; Army; Air Force; Other ranks; Navy; Army; Air Force

His Majesty's Armed Forces, also known colloquially as the British Armed Forces, are the unified military forces responsible for the defence of the United Kingdom, its Overseas Territories and the Crown Dependencies. They also promote the UK's wider interests, support international peacekeeping efforts and provide humanitarian aid.

Since the formation of the united Kingdom of Great Britain in 1707 (later succeeded by the United Kingdom of Great Britain and Ireland in 1801, and finally by the United Kingdom of Great Britain and Northern Ireland in 1927), the British Armed Forces have seen action in most major wars involving the world's great powers, including the Seven Years' War, the Napoleonic Wars, the Crimean War, the First World War and the Second World War. Britain's victories in most of these wars allowed it to influence world events and establish itself as one of the world's leading military and economic powers. The British Armed Forces consist of: the Royal Navy, a blue-water navy with a fleet of 62 commissioned and active ships, together with the Royal Marines, a highly specialised amphibious light infantry force; the British Army, the UK's land warfare branch; and the Royal Air Force, a technologically sophisticated air force with a diverse operational fleet consisting of both fixed-wing and rotary aircraft. The British Armed Forces include standing forces, the Regular, Volunteer and Sponsored Reserves.

King Charles III, sovereign of the United Kingdom, is the commander-in-chief and is styled as Head of the Armed Forces, with officers and personnel swearing allegiance to him. Long-standing constitutional convention, however, has vested de facto executive authority, by the exercise of royal prerogative, in the Prime Minister and the Secretary of State for Defence. The Prime Minister (acting with the Cabinet) makes the key decisions on the use of the armed forces. The UK Parliament approves the continued existence of the British Army by passing an Armed Forces Act at least once every five years, as required by the Bill of Rights 1689. Only a "standing army" requires reapproval by Parliament; the Royal Navy, Royal Air Force, and the Royal Marines, and any other forces are not included in the requirement. The armed forces are managed by the Defence Council.

The United Kingdom is one of five recognised nuclear powers, a permanent member of the United Nations Security Council, a founding and leading member of NATO and party to the AUKUS security pact and the Five Power Defence Arrangements. Overseas garrisons and training facilities are maintained at Ascension Island, Bahrain, Belize, Bermuda, British Indian Ocean Territory, Brunei, Canada, Cyprus, the Falkland Islands, Germany, Gibraltar, Kenya, Montserrat, Nepal, Qatar, Singapore and the United States. The British Armed Forces provided military training to approximately 140 countries in 2024–25.

== History ==
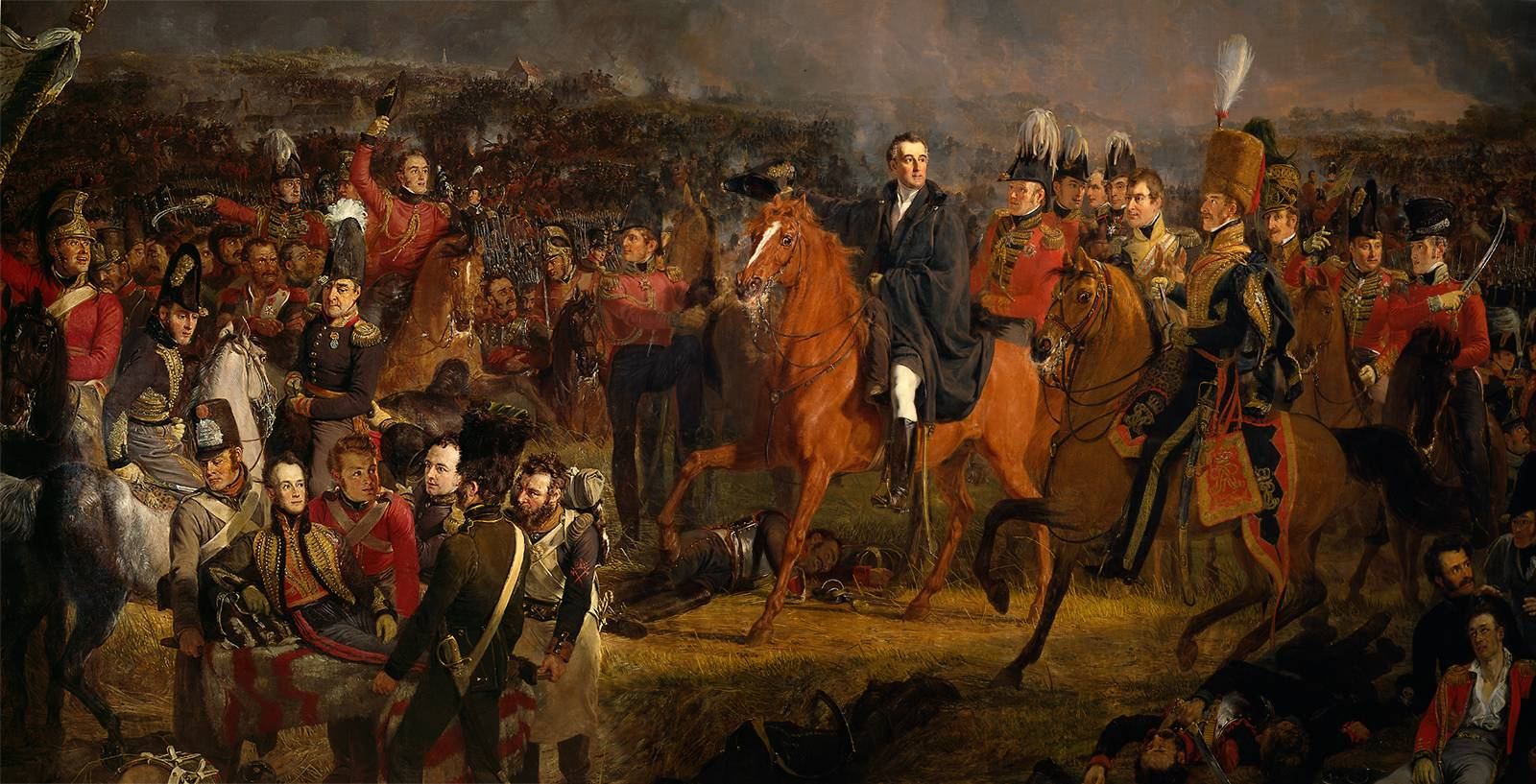
Arthur Wellesley, 1st Duke of Wellington at the Battle of Waterloo, 1815

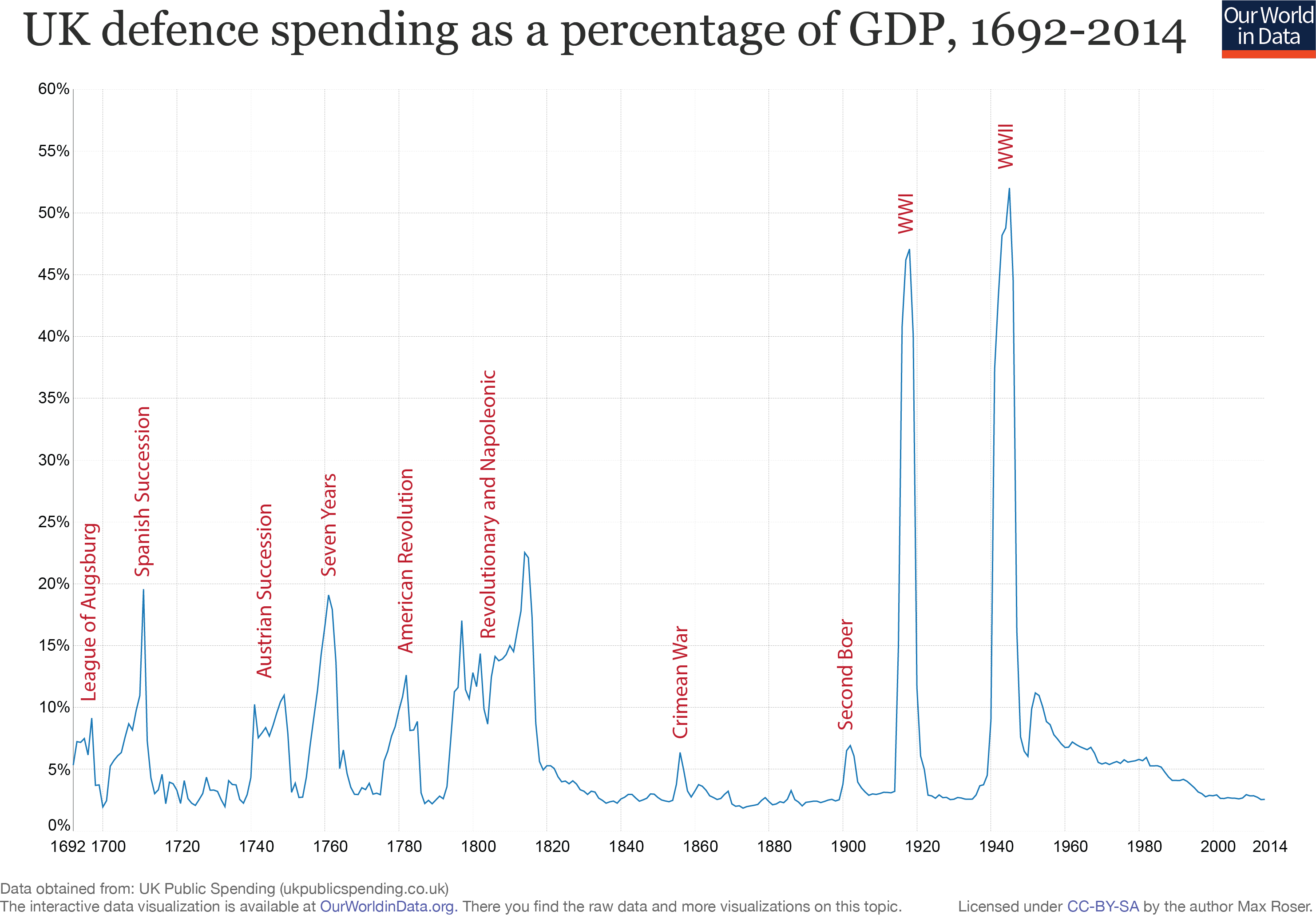
Defence spending in the UK

=== Organisation ===
With the Acts of Union 1707, the armed forces of England and Scotland were merged into the armed forces of the Kingdom of Great Britain.

There were originally several naval and several military regular and reserve forces, although most of these were consolidated into the Royal Navy or the British Army during the 19th and 20th Centuries (the Royal Naval Air Service and Flying Corps of the British Army, by contrast, were separated from their parent forces in 1918 and amalgamated to form a new force, the Royal Air Force, which would have complete responsibility for naval, military and strategic aviation until the Second World War). Naval forces included the Royal Navy, the Waterguard, later renamed the HM Coastguard, and Sea Fencibles and River Fencibles formed as and when required for the duration of emergencies. The Merchant Navy and offshore fishing boat crews were also important manpower reserves for the armed naval forces. Any seaman was liable to impressment, with many so conscripted especially during the two decades of conflict from the French Revolution until the end of the Napoleonic Wars, and from 1835 registered on the Register of Seamen to identify them as a potential resource, and many of their seamen would serve part time in the Royal Navy Reserve, created under the Naval Reserve Act 1859, and Royal Naval Volunteer Reserve, created in 1903.

The British military (those parts of the British Armed Forces tasked with land warfare, as opposed to the naval forces) historically was divided into several military forces, of which the British Army (also referred to historically as the 'Regular Army' and the 'Regular Force') was only one. The oldest of these organisations was the Militia Force (also referred to as the Constitutional Force), which (in the Kingdom of England) was originally the main military defensive force (there otherwise were originally only royal bodyguards, including the Yeomen Warders and the Yeomen of the Guard, with armies raised only temporarily for expeditions overseas), made up of civilians embodied for annual training or emergencies, and had used various schemes of compulsory service during different periods of its long existence.

The Militia was originally an all infantry force, organised at the city or county level, and members were not required to serve outside of their recruitment area, although the area within which militia units in Britain could be posted was increased to anywhere in the Britain during the 18th century, and Militia coastal artillery, field artillery, and engineers units were introduced from the 1850s. The Yeomanry was a mounted force that could be mobilised in times of war or emergency. Volunteer Force units were also frequently raised during wartime, which did not rely on compulsory service and hence attracted recruits keen to avoid the Militia. These were seen as a useful way to add to military strength economically during wartime, but otherwise as a drain on the Militia and so were not normally maintained in peacetime, although in Bermuda prominent propertied men were still appointed Captains of Forts, taking charge of maintaining and commanding fortified coastal artillery batteries and manned by volunteers (reinforced in wartime by embodied militiamen), defending the colony's coast from the 17th century to the 19th century (when all of the batteries were taken over by the regular Royal Artillery). The militia system was extended to several English (subsequently British) colonies, beginning with Virginia and Bermuda. In some colonies, Troops of Horse or other mounted units similar to the Yeomanry were also created. The militia and volunteer units of a colony were generally considered to be separate forces from the Home Militia Force and Volunteer Force in the United Kingdom, and from the militia forces and volunteer forces of other colonies. Where a colony had more than one militia or volunteer unit, they would be grouped as a militia or volunteer force for that colony, such as the Jamaica Volunteer Defence Force, which comprised the St. Andrew Rifle Corps, or Kingston Infantry Volunteers, the Jamaica Corps of Scouts, and the Jamaica Reserve Regiment, but not the Jamaica Militia Artillery. In smaller colonies with a single militia or volunteer unit, that single unit would still be considered to be listed within a force, or in some case might be named a force rather than a regiment or corps, such as is the case for the Falkland Islands Defence Force and the Royal Montserrat Defence Force. The militia, yeomanry, and volunteer forces collectively were known as the reserve forces, auxiliary forces, or local forces. Officers of these forces could not sit on courts-martial of regular forces personnel. The Mutiny Act did not apply to members of the Reserve Forces.

The other regular military force that existed alongside the British Army was the Board of Ordnance, which included the Ordnance Military Corps (made up of the Royal Artillery, Royal Engineers, and the Royal Sappers and Miners), as well as the originally-civilian Commissariat Stores and transport departments, as well as barracks departments, ordnance factories and various other functions supporting the various naval and military forces. The English Army, subsequently the British Army once Scottish regiments were moved onto its establishment following the Union of the Kingdoms of Scotland and England, was originally a separate force from these, but absorbed the Ordnance Military Corps and various previously civilian departments after the Board of Ordnance was abolished in 1855. The Reserve Forces (which referred to the Home Yeomanry, Militia and Volunteer Forces before the 1859 creation of the British Army Regular Reserve by Secretary of State for War Sidney Herbert, and re-organised under the Reserve Force Act 1867) were increasingly integrated with the British Army through a succession of reforms over the last two decades of the 19th century (in 1871, command of the Auxiliary Forces in the British Isles was taken from the Lords-Lieutenant of counties and transferred to the War Office, though colonial governors retained control of their militia and volunteer forces, and by the end of the century, at the latest, any unit wholly or partly funded from Army funds was considered part of the British Army) and the early years of the 20th century, whereby the Reserve Forces units mostly lost their own identities and became numbered Territorial Force sub-units of regular British Army corps or regiments (the Home Militia had followed this path, with the Militia Infantry units becoming numbered battalions of British Army regiments, and the Militia Artillery integrating within Royal Artillery territorial divisions in 1882 and 1889, and becoming parts of the Royal Field Artillery or Royal Garrison Artillery in 1902 (though retaining their traditional corps names), but was not merged into the Territorial Force when it was created in 1908 (by the merger of the Yeomanry and Volunteer Force). The Militia was instead renamed the Special Reserve, and was permanently suspended after the First World War (although a handful of Militia units survived in the United Kingdom, its colonies, and the Crown Dependencies). Unlike the Home, Imperial Fortress, and Crown Dependency Militia and Volunteer units and forces that continued to exist after the First World War, although parts of the British military, most were not considered parts of the British Army unless they received Army funds, as was the case for the Bermuda Militia Artillery and the Bermuda Volunteer Rifle Corps, which was generally only the case for those in the Channel Islands or the Imperial Fortress colonies (Nova Scotia, before Canadian Confederation, Bermuda, Gibraltar, and Malta). Today, the British Army is the only Home British military force (unless the Army Cadet Force and the Combined Cadet Force are considered), including both the regular army and the forces it absorbed, though British military units organised on Territorial lines remain in British Overseas Territories that are still not considered formally part of the British Army, with only the Royal Gibraltar Regiment and the Royal Bermuda Regiment (an amalgam of the old Bermuda Militia Artillery and Bermuda Volunteer Rifle Corps) appearing on the British Army order of precedence and in the Army List.

Confusingly, and similarly to the dual meaning of the word Corps in the British Army. As an example, the 1st Battalion of the King's Royal Rifle Corps was in 1914 part of the 6th Brigade that was part of the 2nd Infantry Division, which was itself part of 1st Army Corps), the British Army sometimes also used the term expeditionary force or field force to describe a body made up of British Army units, most notably the British Expeditionary Force, or of a mixture of British Army, Indian Army, or Imperial auxiliary units, such as the Malakand Field Force (this is similarly to the naval use of the term task force). In this usage, force is used to describe a self-reliant body able to act without external support, at least within the parameters of the task or objective for which it is employed.

=== British Empire ===
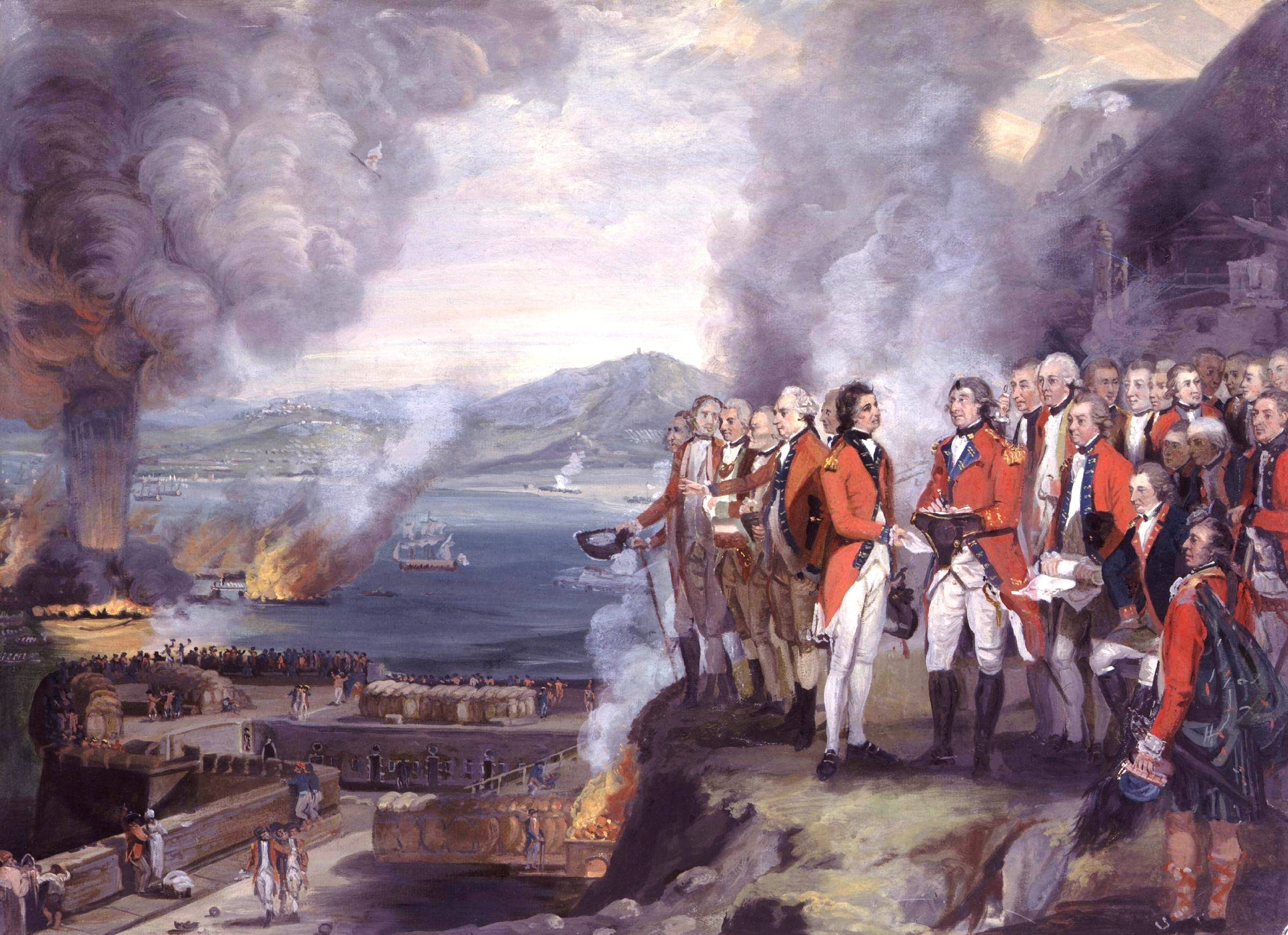
The Great Siege of Gibraltar, showing the defeat of the Franco-Spanish assault in September 1782

During the latter half of the 17th century, and in particular, throughout the 18th century, British foreign policy sought to contain the expansion of rival European powers through military, diplomatic, and commercial means, especially of its chief competitors Spain, the Netherlands, and France. This saw Britain engage in several intense conflicts over colonial possessions and world trade, including a long string of Anglo-Spanish and Anglo-Dutch wars, as well as a series of "world wars" with France, such as; the Seven Years' War (1756–1763), the French Revolutionary Wars (1792–1802) and the Napoleonic Wars (1803–1815). During the Napoleonic wars, the Royal Navy's victory at Trafalgar (1805) under the command of Horatio Nelson (aboard HMS Victory) marked the culmination of British maritime supremacy, and left the Navy in a position of uncontested hegemony at sea. By 1815 and the conclusion of the Napoleonic Wars, Britain had risen to become the world's dominant great power and the British Empire subsequently presided over a period of relative peace, known as Pax Britannica.

With Britain's old rivals no-longer a threat, the 19th century saw the emergence of a new rival, the Russian Empire, and a strategic competition in what became known as The Great Game for supremacy in Central Asia. Britain feared that Russian expansionism in the region would eventually threaten the Empire in India. In response, Britain undertook several pre-emptive actions against perceived Russian ambitions, including the First Anglo-Afghan War (1839–1842), the Second Anglo-Afghan War (1878–1880) and the British expedition to Tibet (1903–1904). During this period, Britain also sought to maintain the balance of power in Europe, particularly against Russian expansionism, who at the expense of the waning Ottoman Empire had ambitions to "carve up the European part of Turkey". This ultimately led to British involvement in the Crimean War (1854–1856) against the Russian Empire.

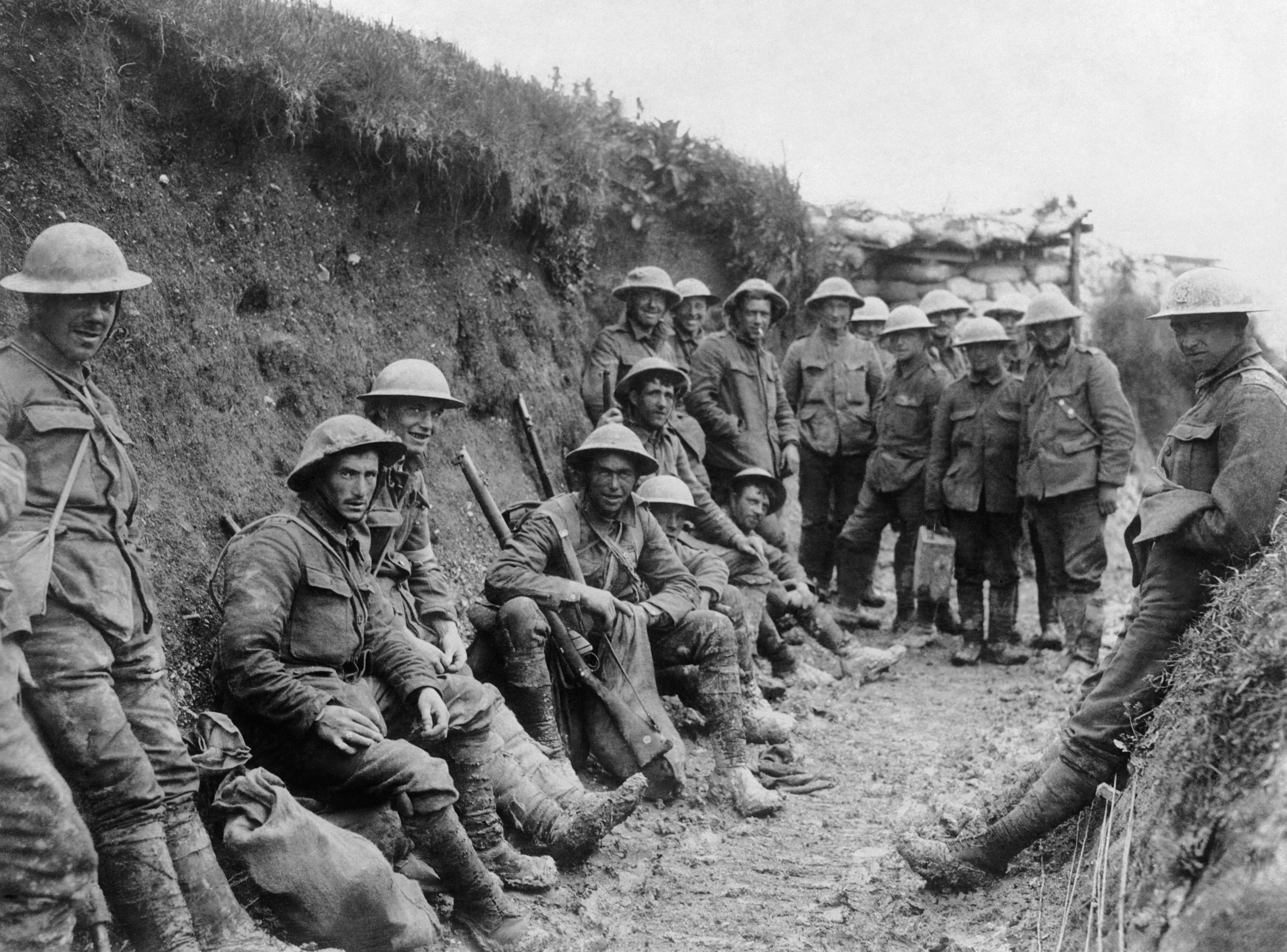
Royal Irish Rifles soldiers at the Battle of the Somme in 1916

=== First World War ===
The beginning of the 20th century served to reduce tensions between Britain and the Russian Empire, partly due to the emergence of a unified German Empire. The era brought about an Anglo-German naval arms race, which encouraged significant advancements in maritime technology, including Dreadnoughts, torpedoes, submarines, and, in 1906, Britain determined that its only likely naval enemy was Germany. The accumulated tensions in European relations finally broke out into the hostilities of the First World War (1914–1918), in what is recognised today, as the most devastating war in British military history, with nearly 800,000 men killed and over 2 million wounded. Allied victory resulted in the defeat of the Central Powers, the end of the German Empire, the Treaty of Versailles and the establishment of the League of Nations.

=== Second World War ===
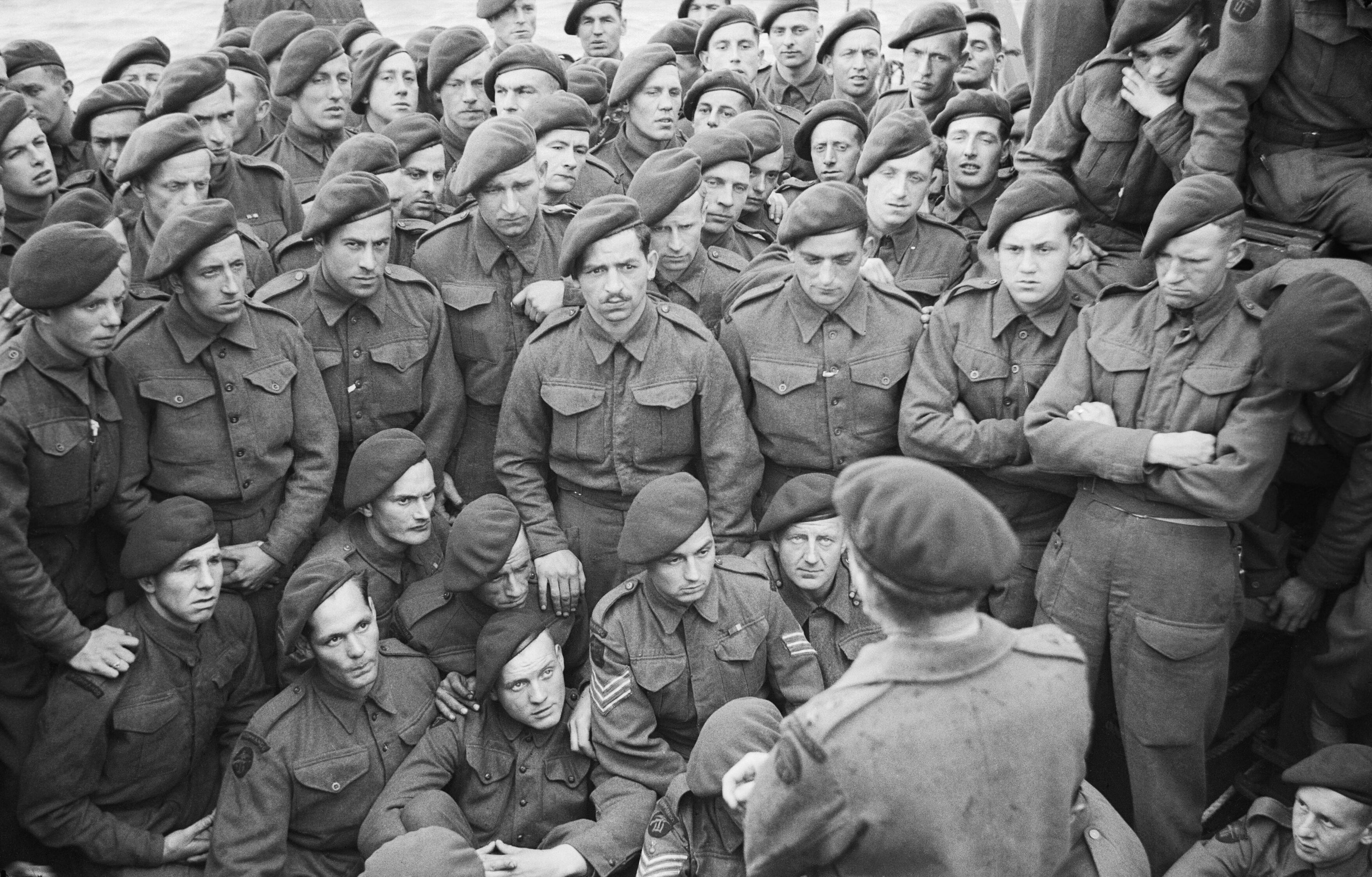
Men of No. 4 Commando being briefed before the Normandy landings in 1944

Germany was defeated in the First World War, but by 1933 fascism had given rise to Nazi Germany, which under the leadership of Adolf Hitler re-militarised in defiance of the Treaty of Versailles. Once again tensions accumulated in European relations, and following Germany's invasion of Poland in September 1939, the Second World War began (1939–1945). The conflict was the most widespread in British history, with British Empire and Commonwealth troops engaged in military campaigns in Europe, North Africa, the Middle East, and the Far East. Approximately 390,000 British Empire and Commonwealth troops died. Allied victory resulted in the defeat of the Axis powers and the establishment of the United Nations, replacing the League of nations.

=== Cold War ===
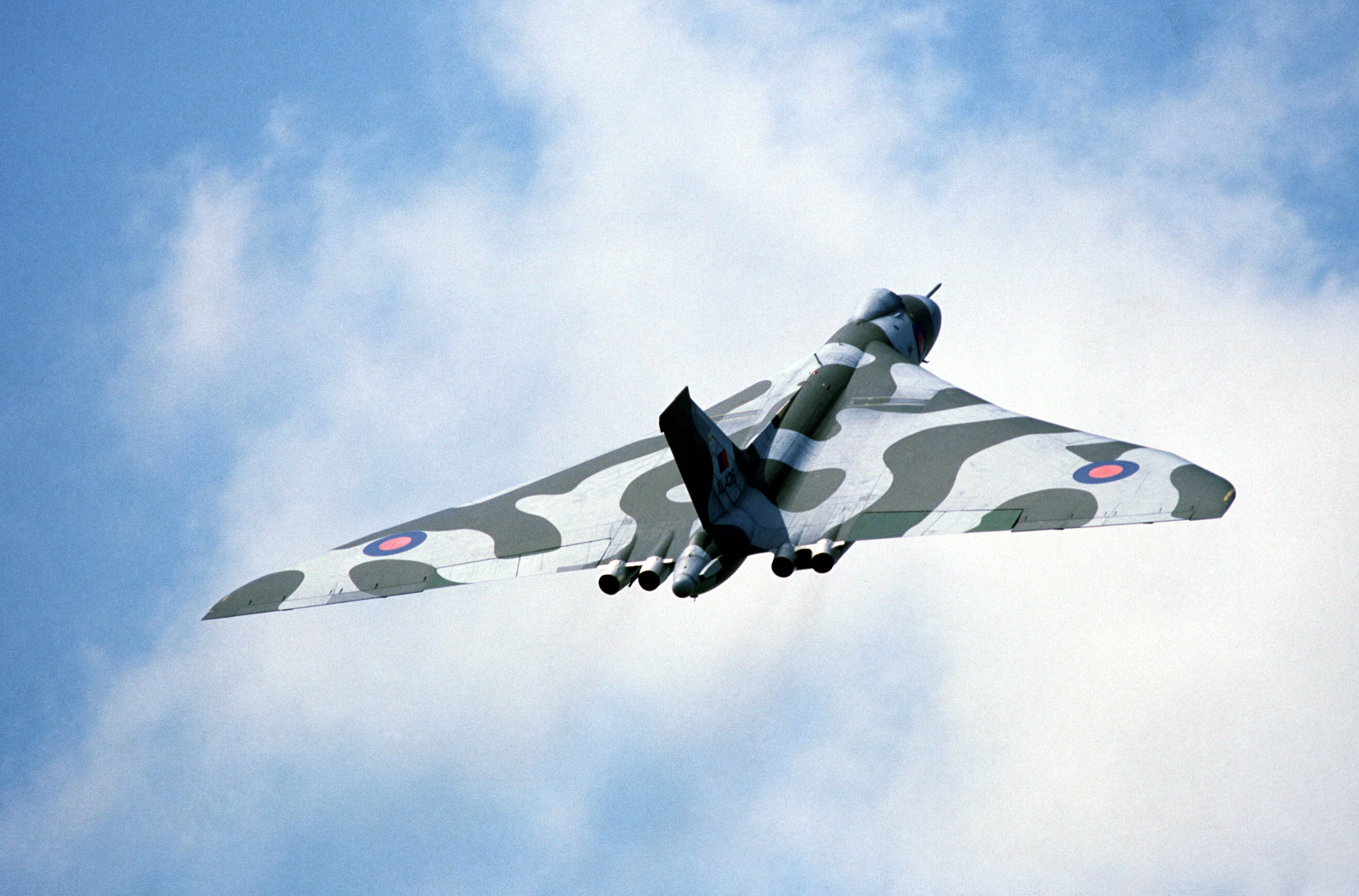
The Vulcan Bomber was the mainstay of Britain's airborne nuclear capability for much of the Cold War.

Post–Second World War economic and political decline, as well as changing attitudes in British society and government, were reflected by the armed forces' contracting global role, and later epitomised by its political defeat during the Suez Crisis (1956). Reflecting Britain's new role in the world and the escalation of the Cold War (1947–1991), the country became a founding member of the NATO military alliance in 1949. Defence Reviews, such as those in 1957 and 1966, announced significant reductions in conventional forces, the pursuement of a doctrine based on nuclear deterrence, and a permanent military withdrawal east of Suez. By the mid-1970s, the armed forces had reconfigured to focus on the responsibilities allocated to them by NATO. The British Army of the Rhine and RAF Germany consequently represented the largest and most important overseas commitments that the armed forces had during this period, while the Royal Navy developed an anti-submarine warfare specialisation, with a particular focus on countering Soviet submarines in the Eastern Atlantic and North Sea.

While NATO obligations took increased prominence, Britain nonetheless found itself engaged in several low-intensity conflicts, including a spate of insurgencies against colonial occupation. However, the Dhofar Rebellion (1962–1976) and The Troubles (1969–1998) emerged as the primary operational concerns of the armed forces. Perhaps the most important conflict during the Cold War, at least in the context of British defence policy, was the Falklands War (1982).

Since the end of the Cold War, an increasingly international role for the armed forces has been pursued, with re-structuring to deliver a greater focus on expeditionary warfare and power projection. This entailed the armed forces often constituting a major component in peacekeeping and humanitarian missions under the auspices of the United Nations, NATO, and other multinational operations, including: peacekeeping responsibilities in the Balkans and Cyprus, the 2000 intervention in Sierra Leone and participation in the UN-mandated no-fly zone over Libya (2011). Post-9/11, the armed forces became heavily committed to the war on terror (2001–present), with lengthy campaigns in Afghanistan (2001–2021) and Iraq (2003–2009), and more recently as part of the Military intervention against ISIL (2014–present). Britain's military intervention against Islamic State was expanded following a parliamentary vote to launch a bombing campaign over Syria; an extension of the bombing campaign requested by the Iraqi government against the same group. In addition to the aerial campaign, the British Army has trained and supplied allies on the ground, and the Special Air Service, the Special Boat Service, and the Special Reconnaissance Regiment (British special forces) have carried out various missions on the ground in both Syria and Iraq.

The armed forces have also been called upon to assist with national emergencies through the provisions of the military aid to the civil authorities (MACA) mechanism. This has seen the armed forces assist government departments and civil authorities responding to flooding, food shortages, wildfires, terrorist attacks and the COVID-19 pandemic; The armed forces' support to the latter falls under Operation Rescript, described as the UK's "biggest ever homeland military operation in peacetime" by the Ministry of Defence. Figures released by the Ministry of Defence on 31 March 2016 show that 7,185 British Armed Forces personnel have lost their lives in medal earning theatres since the end of the Second World War.

In 2025, under Prime Minister Keir Starmer, the UK published a new Strategic Defence Review (SDR) calling for a shift to "warfighting readiness". Major investments were announced, including the expansion of the SSN-AUKUS attack submarine program to up to 12 boats, acquisition of long-range weapons and advanced air-defence systems, and a possible entry into NATO's nuclear-sharing scheme via the F-35A platform.

== Today ==
=== Command ===
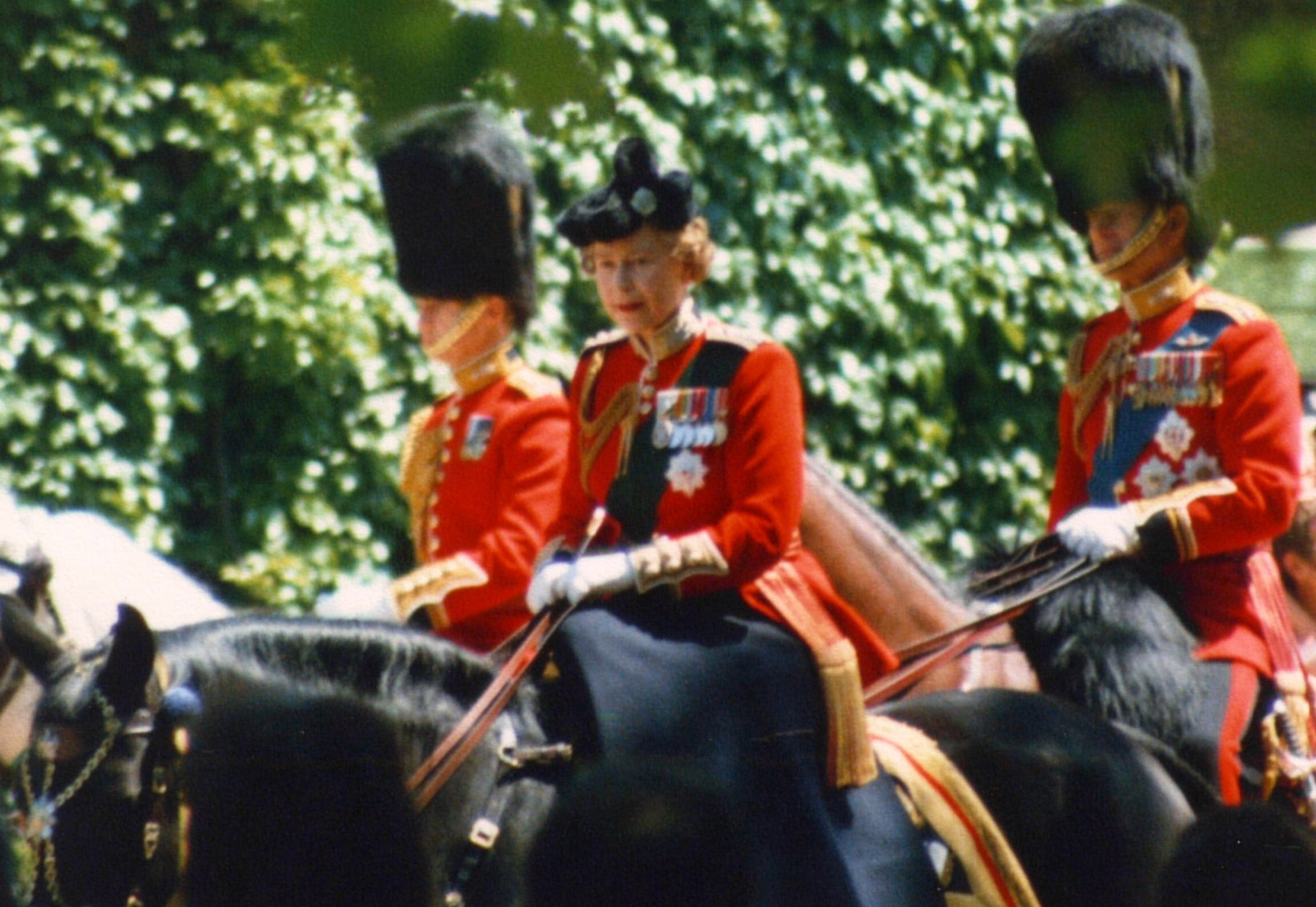
Then Commander-in-Chief Queen Elizabeth II riding Burmese at the 1986 Trooping the Colour ceremony

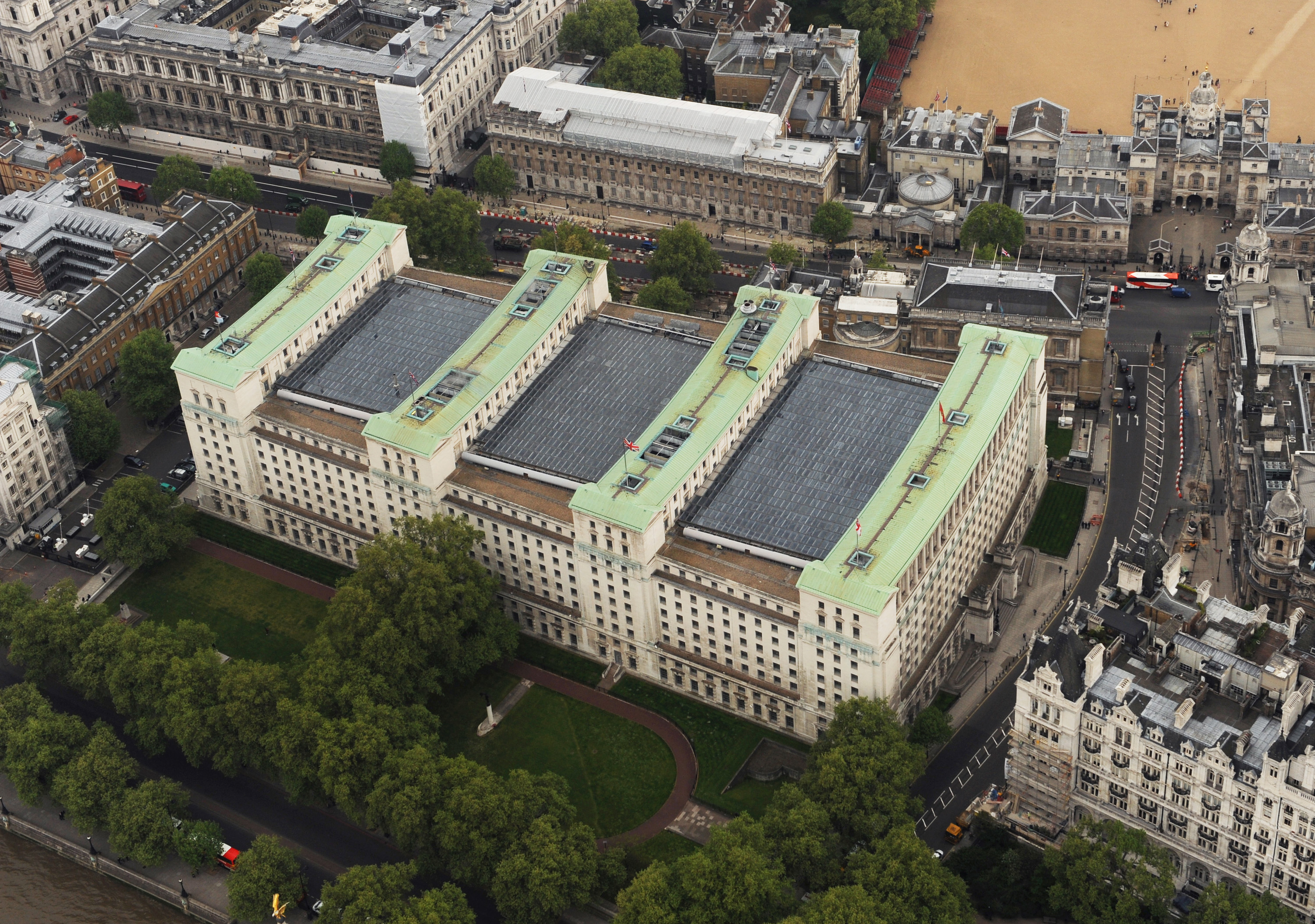
The Ministry of Defence building at Whitehall, Westminster, London

King Charles III, sovereign of the United Kingdom, is the Head of the Armed Forces, with officers and personnel swearing allegiance to him. Long-standing constitutional convention, however, has de facto vested military authority and associated royal prerogative powers in the prime minister and the secretary of state for defence, with the former (acting with the support of the Cabinet) making the key decisions on the use of the armed forces. As the prime minister is not the formal head of the armed forces, the chief of the defence staff could refuse a direction by them to use the UK's nuclear arsenal.

The Ministry of Defence (Note: The current structure of defence management in Britain was set in place in 1964 when the modern-day Ministry of Defence (MoD) was created (an earlier form had existed since 1940). The MoD assumed the roles of the Admiralty, the War Office and the Air Ministry). The MOD is the government department charged with formulating and executing defence policy. It currently employs 56,860 civilian staff members as of 1 October 2015. The department is administered by the secretary of state for defence who is assisted by the Minister of State for the Armed Forces, Minister for Defence Procurement, and Minister for Veterans' Affairs. Responsibility for the management of the forces is delegated to several committees: the Defence Council, Chiefs of Staff Committee, Defence Management Board, and three single-service boards. The Defence Council, composed of senior representatives of the services and the Ministry of Defence, provides the "formal legal basis for the conduct of defence". The three constituent single-service committees (Admiralty Board, Army Board and Air Force Board) are chaired by the Secretary of State for Defence.

The chief of the defence staff (CDS) is the senior-most officer of the armed forces and is an appointment that can be held by an admiral, air chief marshal or general. Before the practice was discontinued in the 1990s, those who were appointed to the position of CDS had been elevated to the most senior rank in their respective service. The CDS, along with the Permanent Under Secretary, is the principal military adviser to the Secretary of State. All three services have their own respective professional chiefs; the First Sea Lord for the Royal Navy, the chief of the general staff for the Army and the chief of the air staff for the Royal Air Force.

=== Personnel ===
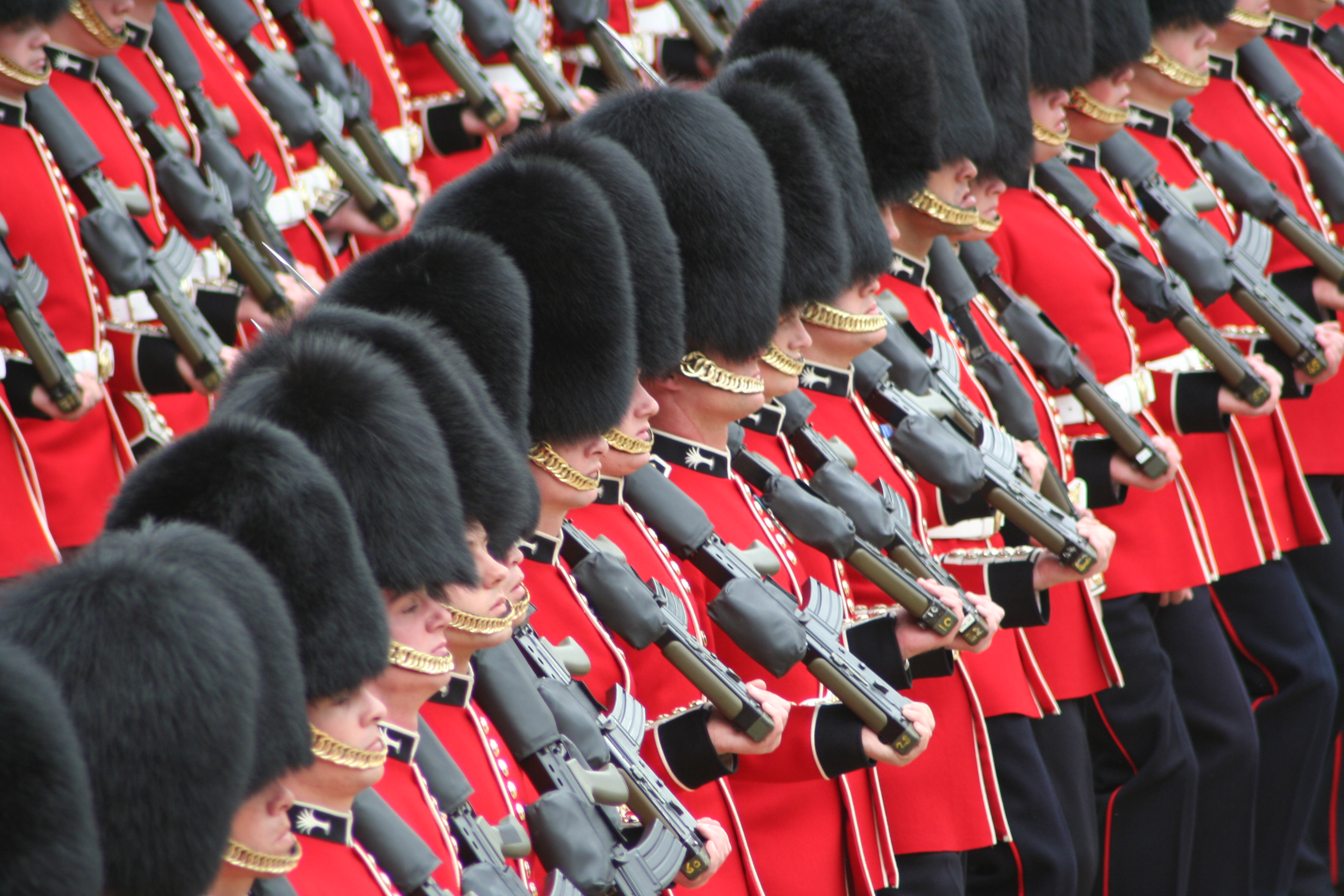
Welsh Guards Trooping the Colour

As of 1 July 2025 the British Armed Forces are a professional force with a total strength of 180,779 personnel, consisting of 136,117 UK Regulars and 4,127 Gurkhas, 31,967 Volunteer Reserves and 8,568 "Other Personnel". (Note: Other Personnel includes personnel of the Military Provost Guard Service, Regular Reserves called up for duty and the Sponsored Reserves.) As a percentage breakdown of UK Service Personnel, 77.1% are UK Regulars and Gurkhas, 18.8% are Volunteer Reserves and 4.1% are composed of Other Personnel. In addition, all ex-Regular personnel retain a "statutory liability for service" and are liable to be recalled (under Section 52 of the Reserve Forces Act (RFA) 1996) for duty during wartime, which is known as the Regular Reserve. MoD publications since April 2013 no longer report the entire strength of the Regular Reserve; instead, they only give a figure for Regular Reserves who serve under a fixed-term reserve contract. These contracts are similar in nature to those of the Volunteer Reserve.

The distribution of personnel between the services and categories of service on 1 April 2026 was as follows:

Service	Regular	Volunteer Reserve	Other personnel	Total
Navy	32,520	3,230	2,550	38,300
Army and Gurkhas	78,830	25,730	4,920	109,480
Air Force	31,080	3,070	1,470	35,630
Total	142,430	32,030	8,940	183,410

On 1 April 2024, most personnel in the UK Regular Forces were stationed in the United Kingdom (around 96%).

Of the 5,700 personnel stationed overseas, around two thirds were in Europe (66%), while 14% were stationed in North America, 6% in North Africa and the Middle East, 6% in Asia and 5% in Sub-Saharan Africa. 1,230 personnel were distributed across several regions in Germany, primarily North Rhine-Westphalia as part of British Army Germany. However, up to 750 of these were Locally Engaged Civilians.

=== Defence expenditure ===
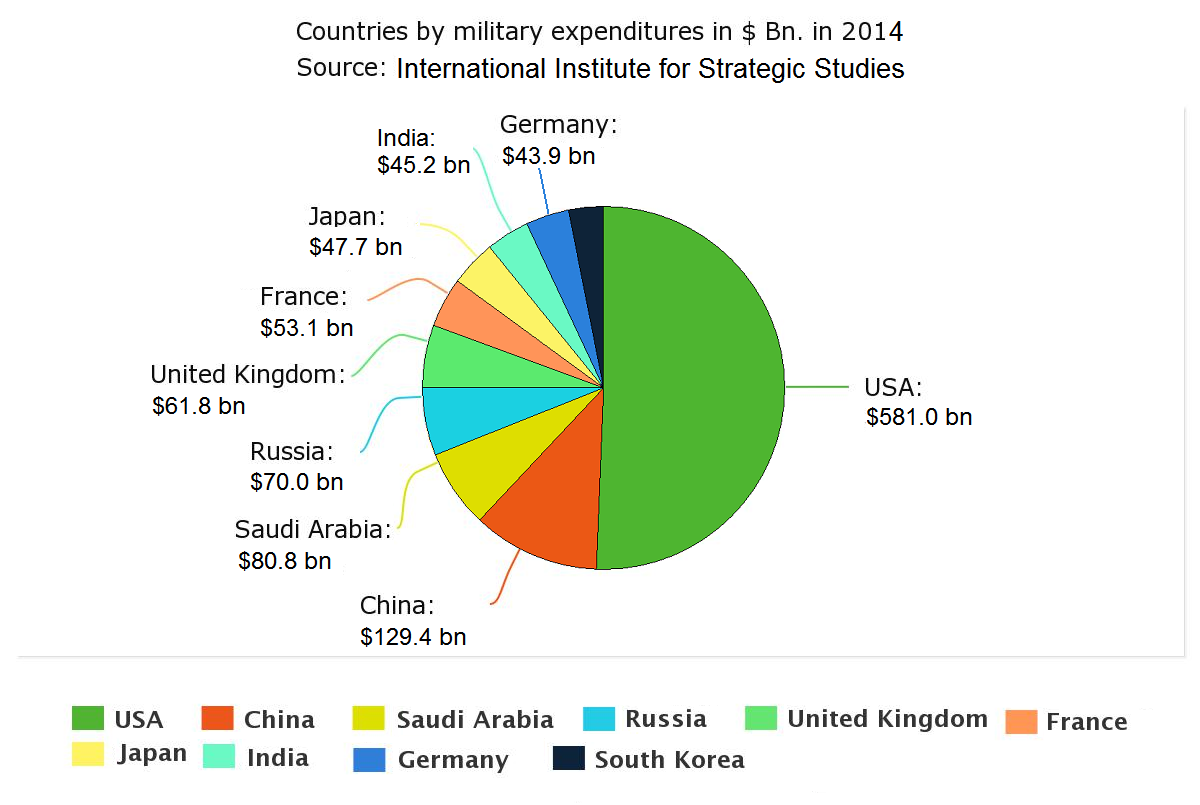
Top ten military expenditures in billion US$ in 2014

According to the Stockholm International Peace Research Institute, the United Kingdom is in sixth place in the world's military spending list in 2025. For comparison: Great Britain spends more in absolute terms than Ukraine, Saudi Arabia, France or Japan, but less than India, Germany, Russia, China or the United States. In September 2011, according to Professor Malcolm Chalmers of the Royal United Services Institute, current "planned levels of defence spending should be enough for the United Kingdom to maintain its position as one of the world's top military powers, as well as being one of NATO-Europe's top military powers. Its edge – not least its qualitative edge – in relation to rising Asian powers seems set to erode, but will remain significant well into the 2020s, and possibly beyond." The Strategic Defence and Security Review 2015 committed to spending 2% of GDP on defence and announced a £178 billion investment over ten years in new equipment and capabilities. On 8 March 2023 Prime Minister Rishi Sunak announced a further £5bn in defence spending with a long-term goal of an increased spending to 2.5% of GDP.

=== Nuclear weapons ===
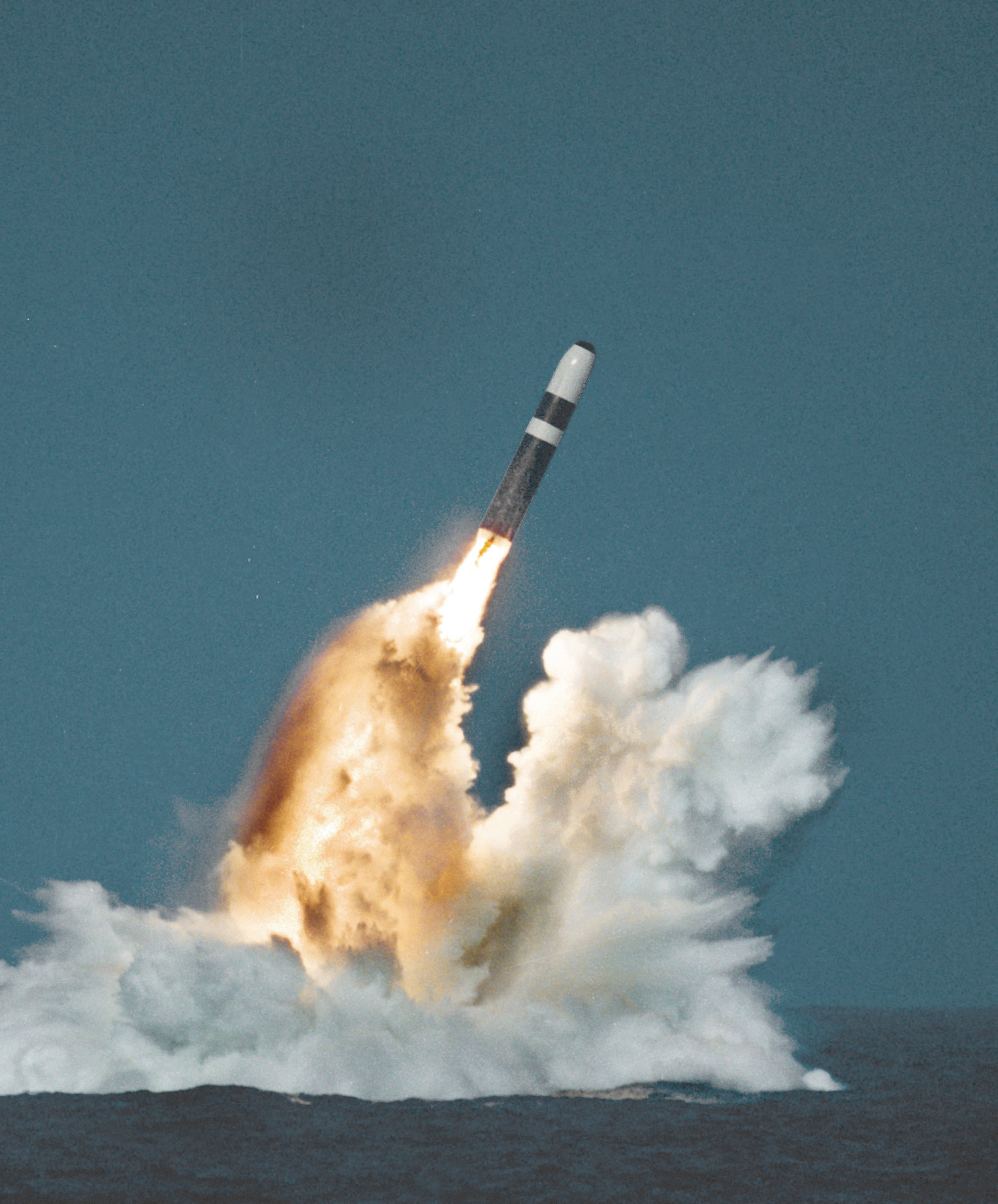
A Trident II SLBM being launched from a Vanguard-class submarine

The United Kingdom is one of five recognised nuclear weapon states under the Non-Proliferation Treaty and maintains an independent nuclear deterrent, currently consisting of four Vanguard-class ballistic missile submarines, UGM-133 Trident II submarine-launched ballistic missiles, and 160 operational thermonuclear warheads. This is known as Trident in both public and political discourse (with nomenclature taken after the UGM-133 Trident II ballistic missile). Trident is operated by the Royal Navy Submarine Service, charged with delivering a 'Continuous At-Sea Deterrent' (CASD) capability, whereby one of the Vanguard-class strategic submarines is always on patrol. According to the British Government, since the introduction of Polaris (Trident's predecessor) in the 1960s, from April 1969 "the Royal Navy's ballistic missile boats have not missed a single day on patrol", giving what the Defence Council described in 1980 as a deterrent "effectively invulnerable to pre-emptive attack". As of 2015, it has been British Government policy for the Vanguard-class strategic submarines to carry no more than 40 nuclear warheads, delivered by eight UGM-133 Trident II ballistic missiles. In contrast with the other recognised nuclear weapon states, the United Kingdom operates only a submarine-based delivery system, having decommissioned its tactical WE.177 free-fall bombs in 1998.

The House of Commons voted on 18 July 2016 in favour of replacing the Vanguard-class submarines with a new generation of Dreadnought-class submarines. The programme will also contribute to extending the life of the UGM-133 Trident II ballistic missiles and modernise the infrastructure associated with the CASD. Former weapons of mass destruction possessed by the United Kingdom include both biological and chemical weapons. These were renounced in 1956 and subsequently destroyed.

=== Overseas military installations ===
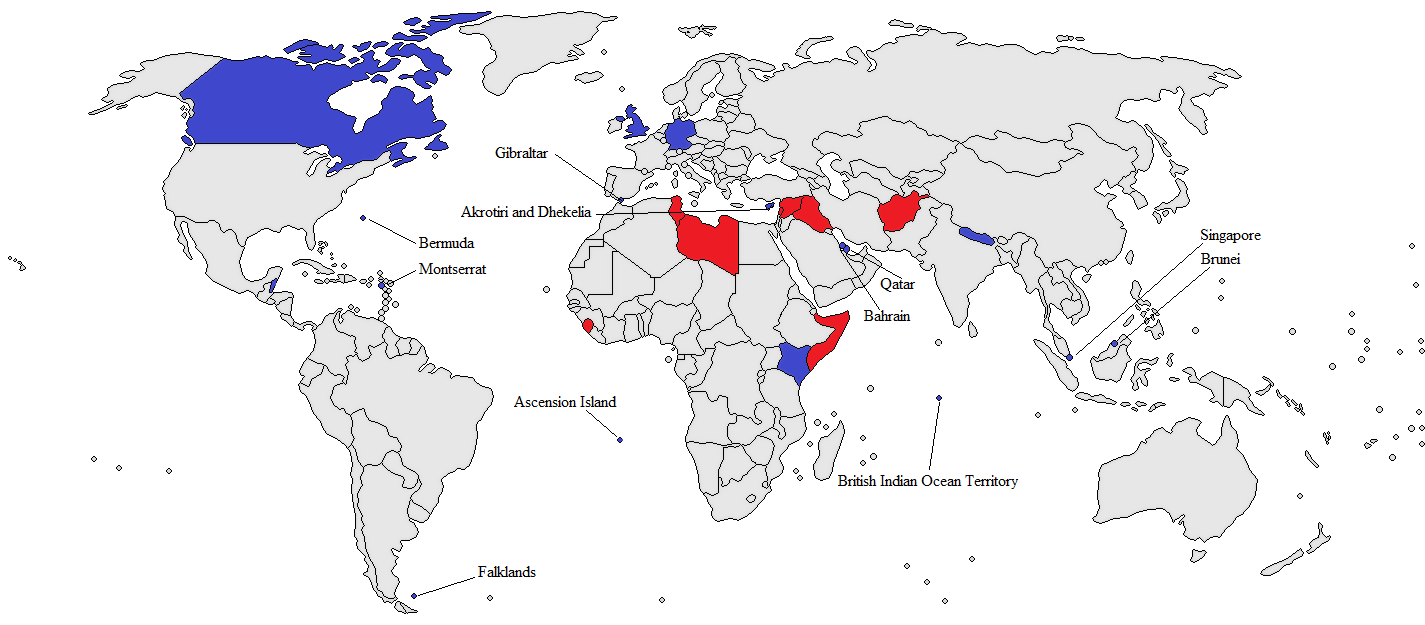
British overseas military installations Overseas military installations of the United Kingdom, and locally raised units of British Overseas Territories. Military interventions since 2000: Palliser (Sierra Leone); Herrick (Afghanistan); Enduring Freedom (Horn of Africa); Telic (Iraq); Ellamy (Libya); and Shader (Islamic State of Iraq and the Levant).

The British Armed Forces historically relied on four Imperial fortress colonies (Bermuda, Gibraltar, Halifax and its environs in Nova Scotia, and Malta), where dockyards were established, naval squadrons based, soldiers garrisoned, and naval and military stores stockpiled. These acted as lynchpins in maintaining British naval supremacy on the Atlantic and its connected seas. As, until the end of the First World War, it was presumed the only navies that might prove a threat were all of countries on, or off, the Atlantic, no Imperial fortress was established in the Pacific or Indian Oceans, to which power would be extended from Bermuda and Malta following the completion of the Panama and Suez canals. Local-service military reserve units were raised in some of the Imperial fortresses (notably Bermuda and Malta), which could be embodied for full-time service in wartime to reinforce the regular garrisons, and these were funded by the War Office as part of the British Army. After the First World War, the growing belligerence and naval power of the Japanese Empire led to the construction of the Singapore Naval Base. The regular British Armed Forces, otherwise distributed around the world, were required to guard against invasion or rebellion, reinforced in some colonies by locally raised reserve forces. In colonies where there was no strategic requirement, regular forces were rarely stationed, with local governments encouraged to maintain and fund military reserve units as contributions to their own defence (although these units were ultimately under the control of the national, i.e., British, Government via the colonial Governors, as defence is not a competency that has been delegated to local governments). Under the North Atlantic Treaty Organisation alliance, and with the steady reduction of both the British Empire and the British Armed Forces over the decades that followed the Second World War, the significance of the three remaining Imperial fortresses (military control of Halifax having passed to the new Dominion government following the 1867 Confederation of Canada, and naval control transferred in 1905 to what was to become the Royal Canadian Navy) rapidly faded. The Bermuda-based North America and West Indies Station was abolished in 1956, and the last regular army units removed from the Bermuda Command in 1957 (leaving only two part-time reserve units), with the naval dockyard in Bermuda reduced to a base, without repair or refit capabilities, in 1951 and finally closed in 1995, following the Cold War (United States and Canadian bases in Bermuda closed in the same period), leaving only the Royal Bermuda Regiment and the Bermuda Sea Cadet Corps there today. Malta became independent in 1964, and the last British armed forces personnel were removed from the former colony in 1979. Gibraltar continues to be used by the regular British Armed Forces, though the naval and military establishment in the colony (now termed a British Overseas Territory) has been reduced to several Royal Naval patrol craft, the locally raised Royal Gibraltar Regiment, and a Royal Air Force Station without aircraft based on it.

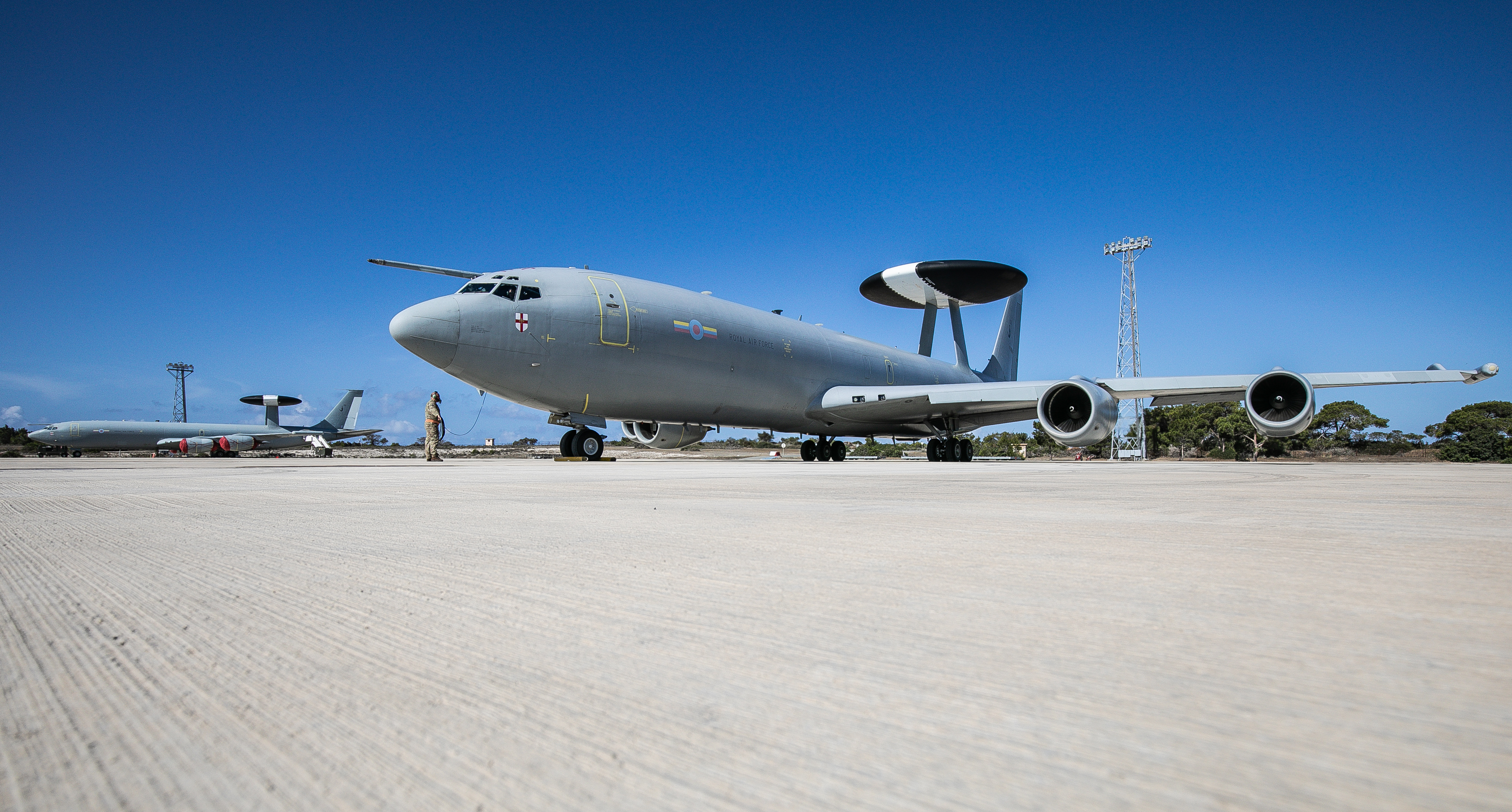
Two Boeing E-3 Sentry aircraft at RAF Akrotiri in Cyprus

The British Armed Forces today maintain several overseas garrisons and military facilities which enable the country to conduct operations worldwide. The majority of Britain's permanent military installations are located on British Overseas Territories (BOTs) or former colonies which retain close diplomatic ties with the United Kingdom, and are located in areas of strategic importance. The most significant of these are the "Permanent Joint Operating Bases" (PJOBs), located on the four overseas territories of Cyprus (British Forces Cyprus), Gibraltar (British Forces Gibraltar), the Falkland Islands (British Forces South Atlantic Islands) and Diego Garcia (British Forces British Indian Ocean Territories). While not a PJOB, Ascension Island (another BOT) is home to the airbase RAF Ascension Island, notable for use as a staging post during the 1982 Falklands War, the territory is also the site of a joint UK-US signals intelligence facility.

Qatar is home to RAF Al Udeid, a Royal Air Force outpost at Al Udeid Air Base which serves as the operational headquarters for No. 83 Expeditionary Air Group and its operations across the Middle East. A large Royal Navy Naval Support Facility (NSF) is located in Bahrain, established in 2016 it marks the British return East of Suez. In support of the Five Power Defence Arrangements (FPDA), the United Kingdom retains a naval repair and logistics support facility at Sembawang wharf, Singapore. Other overseas military installations include; British Forces Brunei, British Army Germany, the British Army Training Unit Kenya, British Army Training Unit Suffield in Canada, British Army Training and Support Unit Belize, and British Gurkhas Nepal.

Some British Overseas Territories also maintain locally raised units and regiments: The Royal Bermuda Regiment, the Falkland Islands Defence Force, the Royal Gibraltar Regiment, the Royal Montserrat Defence Force, the Cayman Islands Regiment, and the Turks and Caicos Regiment. Though their primary mission is "home defence", individuals have volunteered for operational duties. The Royal Bermuda Regiment is an amalgam of the Bermuda Militia Artillery (which had been part of the Royal Regiment of Artillery) and the Bermuda Volunteer Rifle Corps, raised in the 1890s as Imperial forces funded by the War Office as part of the British Army, and both antecedent units sent contingents to the Western Front during the First World War. They also sent contingents that served in North-Western Europe, and Italy, and North Africa during the Second World War. The Royal Gibraltar Regiment mobilised section-sized units for attachment to British regiments deployed during the Iraq War. The Isle of Man, a Crown dependency hosts a multi-capability recruiting and training unit of the British Army Reserve.

Since 1969, Britain has had a military satellite communications system, Skynet, initially in large part to support East of Suez bases and deployments. Since 2015, Skynet has offered near-global coverage.

=== Expeditionary forces ===
The British Armed Forces place significant importance in the ability to conduct expeditionary warfare. While the armed forces are expeditionary in nature, it maintains a core of "high readiness" forces trained and equipped to deploy at very short notice, these include; the Joint Expeditionary Force (Maritime) (Royal Navy), UK Commando Force (Royal Marines), and 16 Air Assault Brigade (British Army). Frequently, these forces will act as part of a greater tri-service effort, under the direction of Permanent Joint Headquarters, or along with like-minded allies under the Joint Expeditionary Force. Similarly, under the auspices of NATO, such expeditionary forces are designed to meet Britain's obligations to the Allied Rapid Reaction Corps and other NATO operations.

In 2010, the governments of the United Kingdom and France signed the Lancaster House Treaties which committed both governments to the creation of a Franco-British Combined Joint Expeditionary Force. It is envisaged as a deployable joint force, for use in a wide range of crisis scenarios, up to and including high intensity combat operations. As a joint force, it involves all three armed Services: a land component composed of formations at the national brigade level, maritime and air components with their associated Headquarters, together with logistics and support functions.

== Branches ==
=== Royal Navy ===
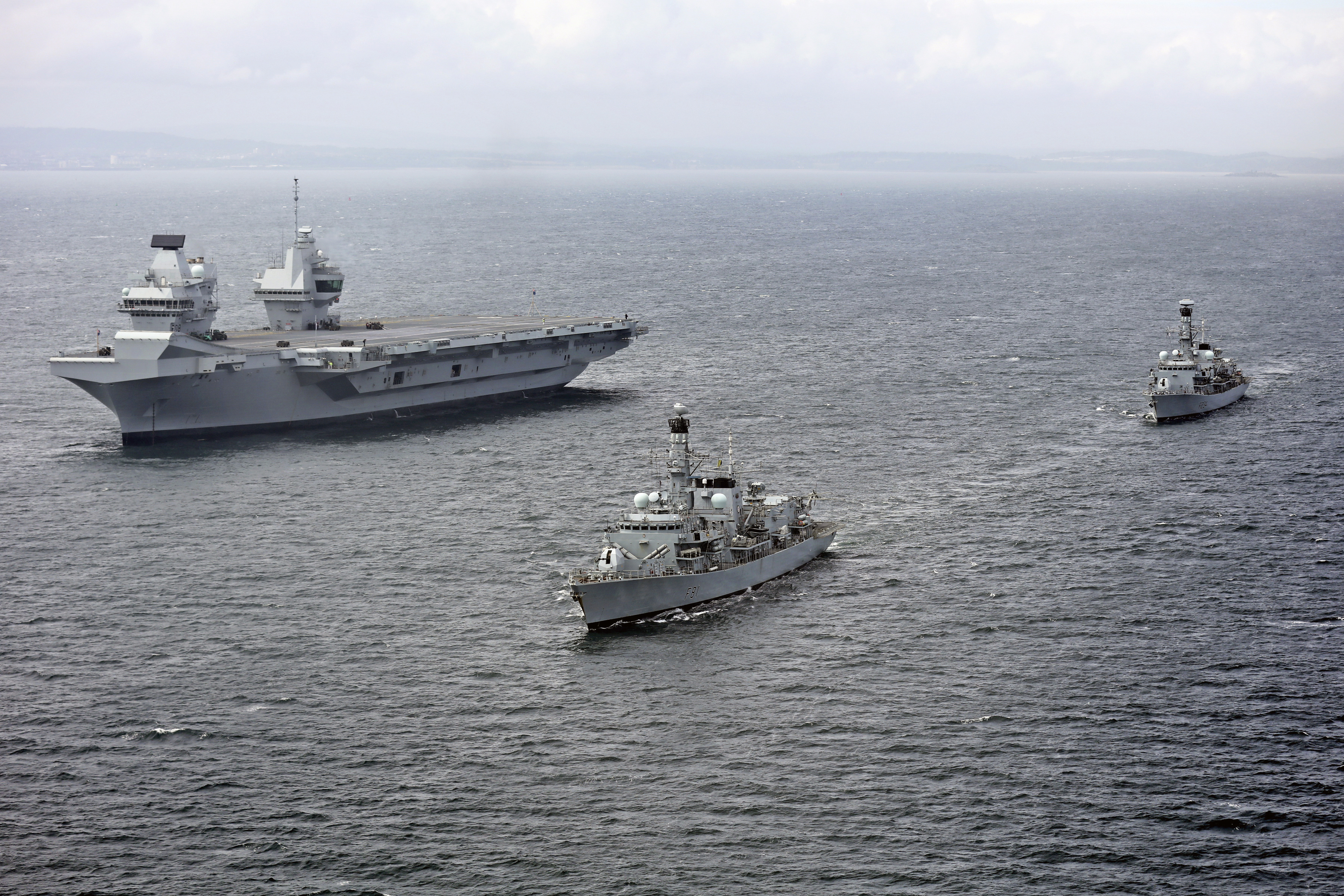
HMS Queen Elizabeth, a Queen Elizabeth-class supercarrier on sea trials in June 2017

The Royal Navy is a technologically sophisticated naval force, and as of July 2026 consists of 60 commissioned and active ships with an additional 9 support vessels of various types operated by the Royal Fleet Auxiliary. Command of deployable assets is exercised by the Fleet Commander of the Naval Service. This is a vice-admiral's position; the last full admiral commanding operational naval forces was Commander-in-Chief Fleet, whose position was abolished in 2012. Personnel matters are the responsibility of the Second Sea Lord/Commander-in-Chief Naval Home Command, an appointment usually held by a vice-admiral.

British surface combatants consist of aircraft carriers, destroyers, frigates, patrol vessels, mine-countermeasure vessels, and other miscellaneous vessels. The recently built Type 45 destroyers are stealthy and technologically advanced air-defence destroyers. The Royal Navy has commissioned two Queen Elizabeth-class aircraft carriers, embarking an air-group including the advanced fifth-generation multi-role fighter, the F-35B Lightning. Surface combatants are supervised by Commander Surface Flotilla. A submarine service has existed within the Royal Navy for more than 100 years. At the end of the Cold War, about 30 submarines were in service. In the mid-2020s, four Vanguard-class nuclear-powered submarines carry Trident II ballistic missiles, forming the United Kingdom's nuclear deterrent. Seven Astute-class nuclear-powered fleet (attack) submarines have been ordered, with six completed and one under construction. The Astute class is the most advanced and largest fleet of submarines ever built for the Royal Navy and will maintain Britain's nuclear-powered submarine fleet capabilities for decades to come.

==== Royal Marines ====
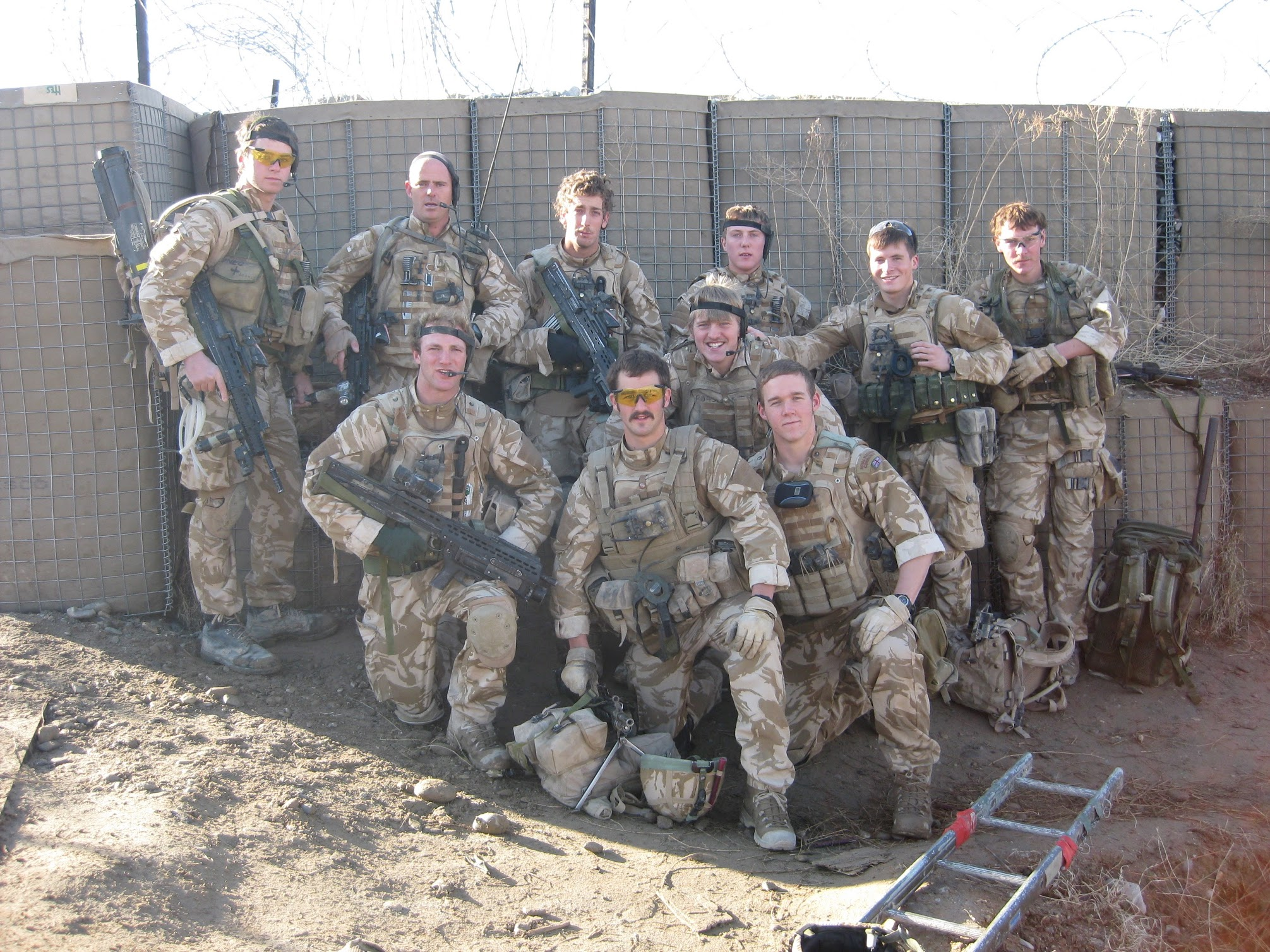
Royal Marines of 45 Commando at FOB Jackson, Helmand Province, 2009

The Royal Marines are the Royal Navy's amphibious troops. Consisting of a single manoeuvre brigade (UK Commando Force) and various independent units, the Royal Marines specialise in amphibious, arctic, and mountain warfare. Contained within UK Commando Force are three attached army units; 383 Commando Petroleum Troop RLC, 29th Commando Regiment Royal Artillery, a field artillery regiment based in Plymouth, and 24 Commando Regiment Royal Engineers. The Commando Logistic Regiment consists of personnel from the Army, Royal Marines, and Royal Navy.

=== British Army ===
The British Army is the land force of the British Armed Forces, and is made up of the Regular Army and the part-time Army Reserve. The Army is commanded by the Chief of the General Staff, a four-star general within Army Headquarters, based at Andover.

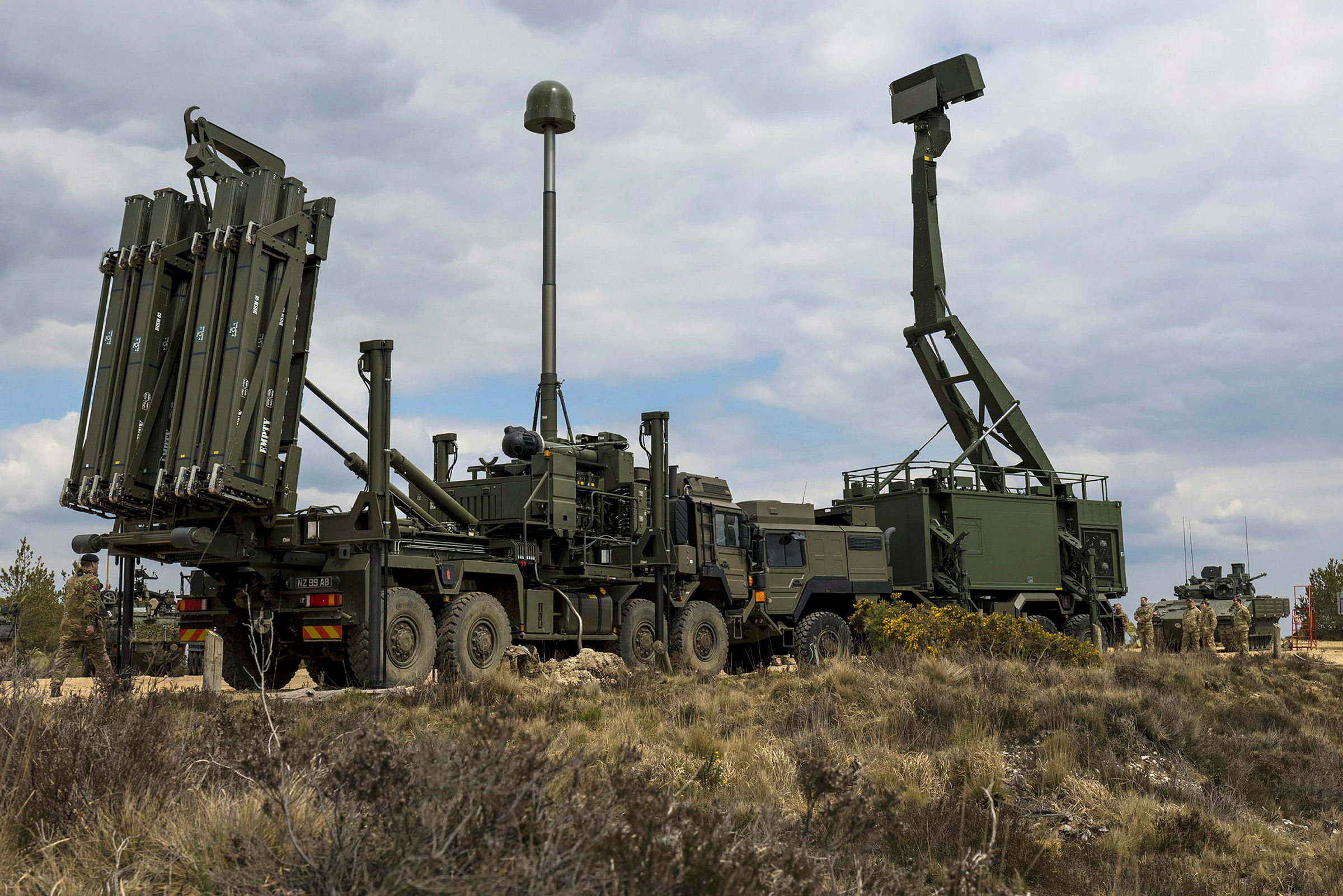
Sky Sabre (with Land Ceptor missiles) ground-based air defence system as operated by 7th Air Defence Group.

Deployable combat formations are;

- 1st (UK) Division, consisting of 16 Air Assault Brigade and four other Light or Light Mechanised Brigades, with supporting engineering, logistic, intelligence and signals units.
- 3rd (UK) Division, consisting of 3rd Deep Reconnaissance Strike Brigade, 7 Air Defence Group, and two armoured brigades, with supporting engineering, logistic, intelligence, and signals units.
- Field Army Troops, consisting of the new Ranger Regiment, in Army Special Operations Brigade; Security Force Assistance Brigade and 77 Brigade, a psychological operations unit.

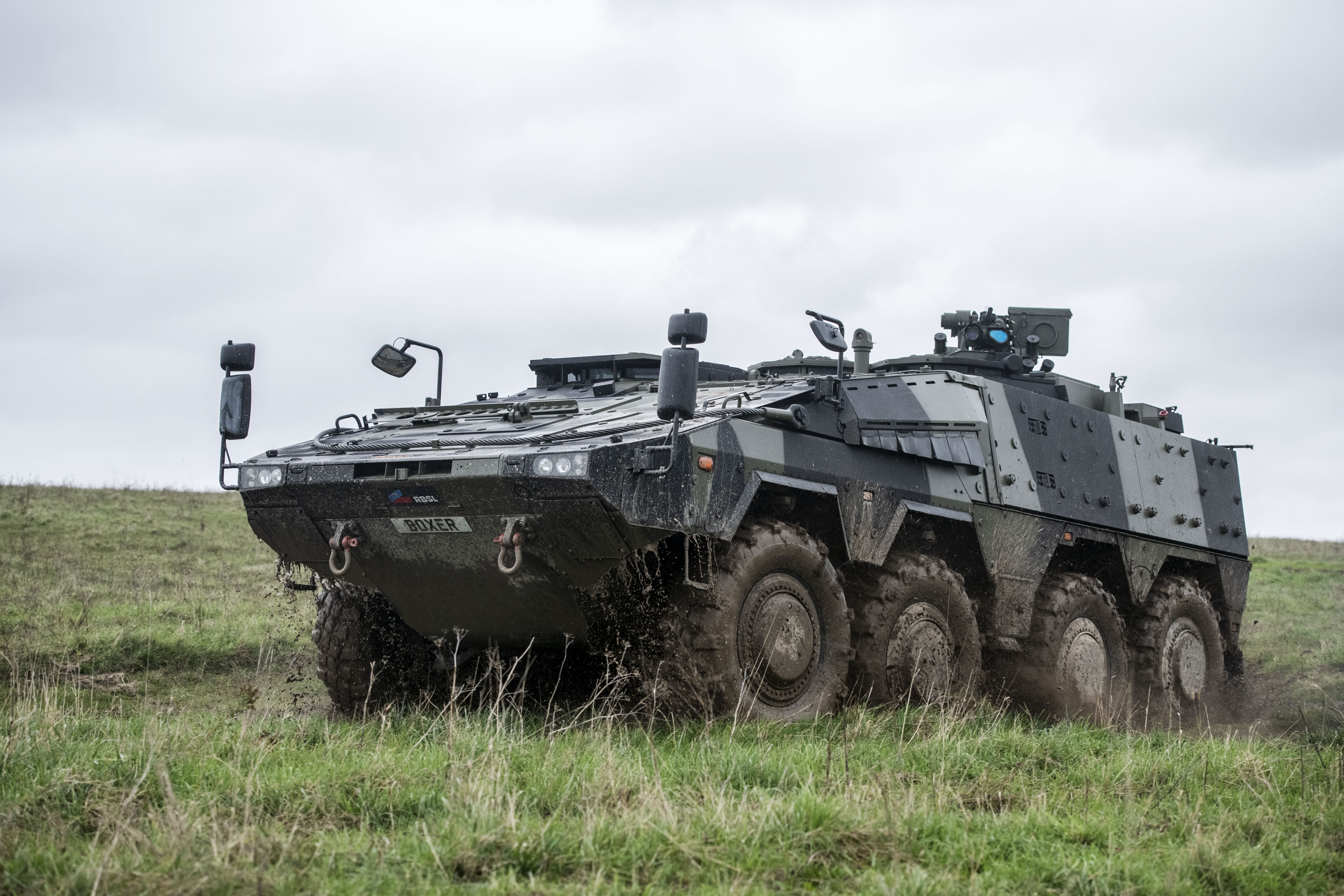
Boxer mechanised infantry vehicle (MIV) with remote weapon station (RWS).

The Infantry of the British Army has a strength of 48 battalions (32 regular and 16 reserve), made up of 17 unique regiments. These battalions are trained and equipped for specific roles within their respective brigades: Light Infantry, such as the famous 1st Battalion Grenadier Guards, within the 4th Light Brigade, fight on foot without armoured vehicles; Light Mechanised Infantry, such as the 1st Battalion Royal Yorkshire Regiment, within the 7th Light Mechanised Brigade, operate the Foxhound protected mobility vehicle; Armoured Infantry (to become Heavy Mechanised Infantry under Future Soldier), such as the 1st Battalion Royal Regiment of Fusiliers, within the 20th Armoured Brigade, operate the Warrior infantry fighting vehicle (IFV), but will be equipped with the new Boxer mechanised infantry vehicle from 2024.

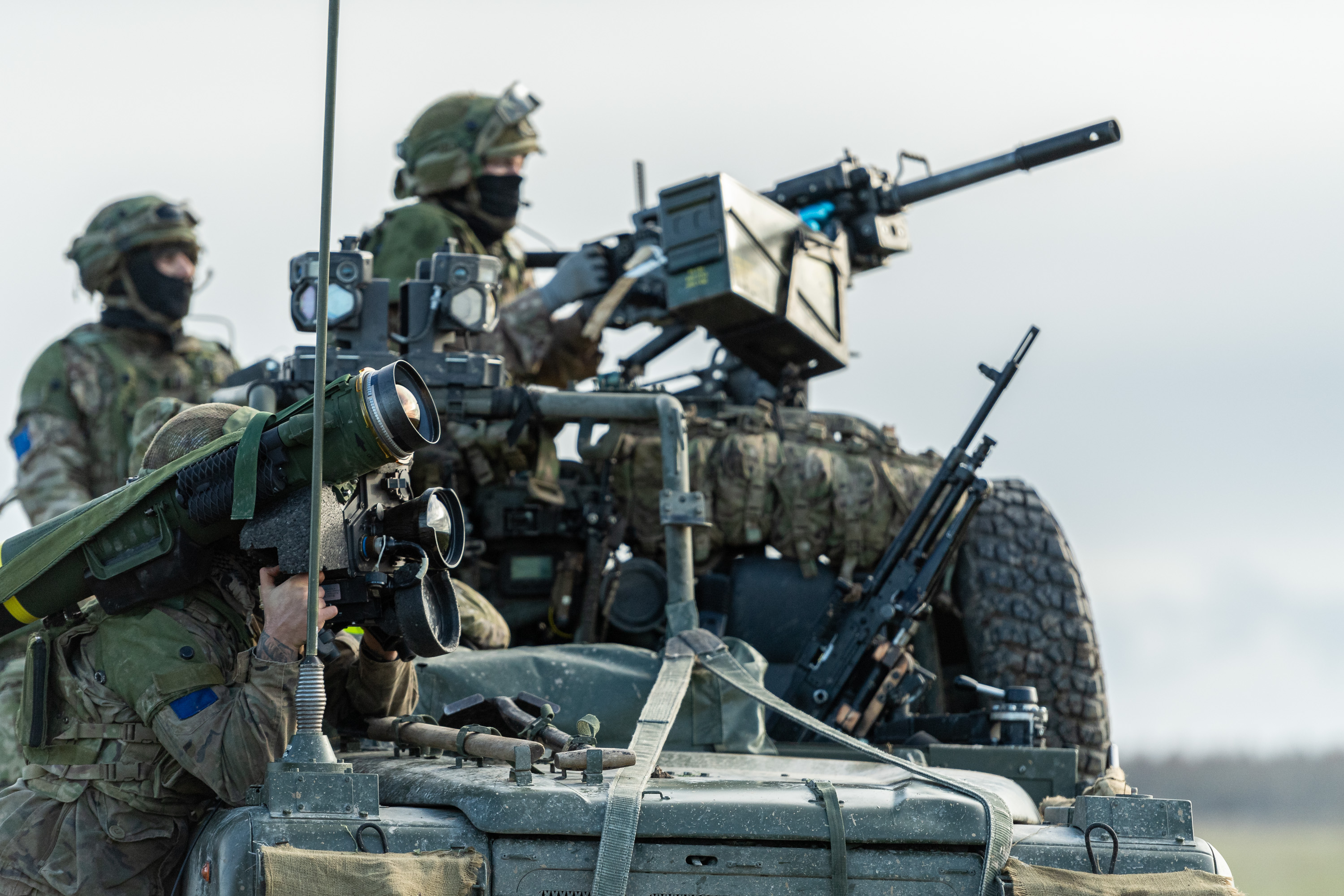
2PARA on a live fire exercise operating the Javelin anti-tank guided missile, GPMG, and GMG from a RWMIK.

The four battalions of the Parachute Regiment, part of 16 Air Assault Brigade and the Special Forces Support Group, are the British Army's elite airborne infantry, held at high readiness and specialising in rapid deployment by parachute and helicopter, widely regarded as the "fittest, most aggressive, resilient and disciplined regiment in the British Army."

The Royal Armoured Corps provides the armoured capability of the British Army. The Royal Tank Regiment, Queen's Royal Hussars and Royal Wessex Yeomanry (of the Army Reserve) operate Challenger 2 main battle tanks, which are being upgraded to Challenger 3, and are part of 3rd (UK) Division's armoured brigades. Armoured Cavalry regiments, such as the Royal Dragoon Guards, currently operate the Warrior IFV on an interim basis, until Ajax reaches full operating capability. There are six Light Cavalry regiments (three Regular + three Reserve) equipped with the Jackal 2 and Coyote TSV, tasked with providing reconnaissance and fire support. The Household Cavalry, made up of the Life Guards and the Blues and Royals, operate in a dual role of Armoured Cavalry and Mounted Ceremonial on Horse Guards in London, and for state occasions.

=== Royal Air Force ===
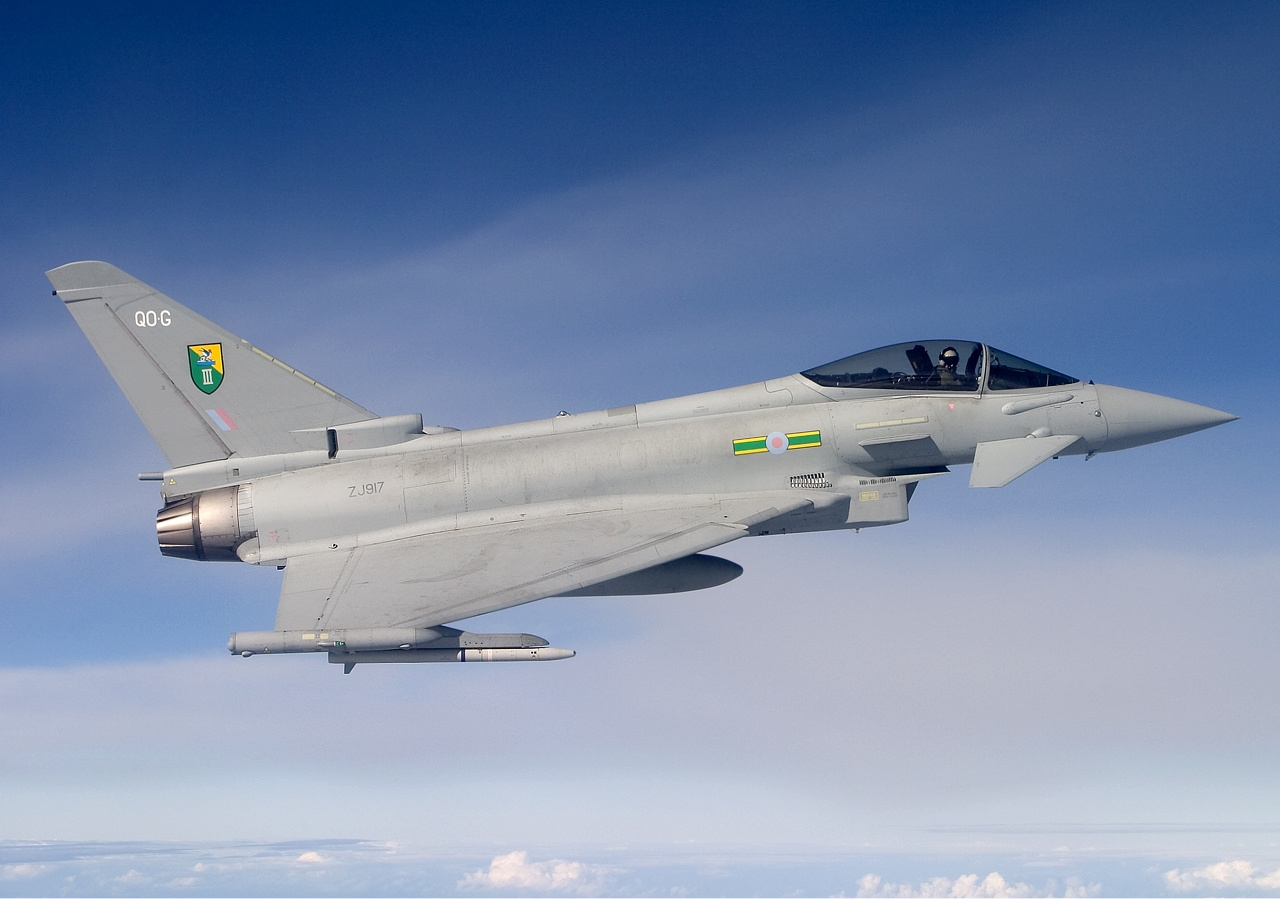
The Eurofighter Typhoon multirole combat aircraft

The Royal Air Force has a large operational fleet that fulfils various roles, consisting of both fixed-wing and rotary aircraft. Frontline aircraft are controlled by Air Command, which is organised into five groups: 1 Group (Air Combat), 2 Group (Air Support), 11 Group (Air and Space operations), 22 Group (training aircraft and ground facilities) and 38 Group (Royal Air Force's Engineering, Logistics, Communications and Medical Operations units). In addition 83 Expeditionary Air Group directs formations in the Middle East and the 38 Group combines the expeditionary combat support and combat service support units of the RAF. Deployable formations consist of Expeditionary Air Wings and squadrons—the basic unit of the Air Force. Independent flights are deployed to facilities in Brunei, the Falkland Islands, Iraq, and the United States.

The Royal Air Force operates multi-role and single-role fighters, reconnaissance and patrol aircraft, tankers, transports, helicopters, unmanned aerial vehicles, and various types of training aircraft.

The Royal Air Force's ground units include the RAF Police; the Royal Air Force Regiment; and a range of specialist maintenance units. The Royal Air Force Regiment is the RAF's ground defence force, which is ready to fight on and around forward airfields, which are densely packed with operationally vital aircraft, equipment, infrastructure, and personnel. The Regiment contains nine regular squadrons, supported by five squadrons of the Royal Auxiliary Air Force Regiment. They provide Forward Air Controllers as well as a contribution to the Special Forces Support Group. They also have a growing Counter-Uncrewed Aerial Systems (C-UAS) role.

== Ministry of Defence ==
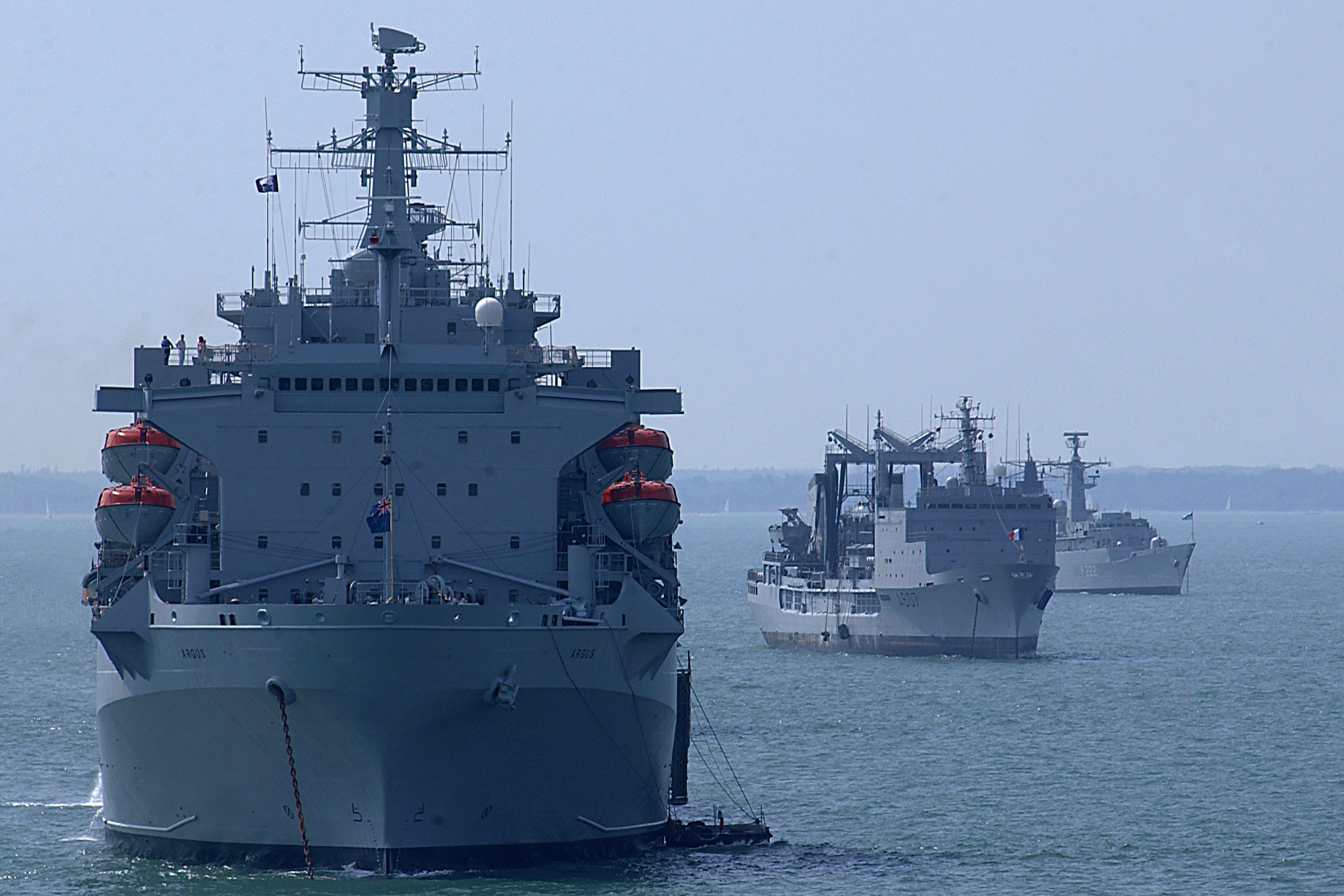
RFA Argus (left), the fleet's aviation training and hospital ship

The Ministry of Defence maintains several civilian agencies in support of the British Armed Forces. Although they are civilians, they play a vital role in supporting Armed Forces operations, and in certain circumstances are under military discipline:

- The Royal Fleet Auxiliary (RFA) operates 9 ships which primarily serve to replenish Royal Navy warships at sea, and also provides an amphibious warfare capability through its three Bay-class landing ship dock vessels. It is manned by 1,750 civilian personnel and is funded and run by the Ministry of Defence.
- The Ministry of Defence Police (MDP) has an established strength of 2,700 police officers, which provide armed security, counter terrorism, uniformed policing, and investigative services to Ministry of Defence property, personnel, and installations throughout the United Kingdom.
- The Defence Equipment and Support (DE&S) is the merged procurement and support organisation within the UK Ministry of Defence (United Kingdom). It came into being on 2 April 2007, bringing together the MoD's Defence Procurement Agency and the Defence Logistics Organisation under the leadership of General Sir Kevin O'Donoghue as the first Chief of Defence Materiel. As of 2012 it has a civilian and military workforce of approx. 20,000 personnel. DE&S is overseen by the Minister for Defence Equipment, Support and Technology.
- The UK Hydrographic Office (UKHO) is an organisation within the UK government responsible for providing navigational and other hydrographic information for national, civil and defence requirements. The UKHO is located in Taunton, Somerset, on Admiralty Way and has a workforce of approximately 1,000 staff.

In 2025–26 about 20% of the MOD budget was spent on the Defence Nuclear Enterprise, which consists primarily of the Submarine Delivery Agency, the Atomic Weapons Establishment, the nuclear-related parts of the Military Strategic Headquarters particularly in the Royal Navy, together with the main industrial partner companies which build and maintain nuclear submarines and their weapons in a ring-fenced budget, with a projection that this proportion will continue to increase to between 20% and 25% of the MOD budget.

== Recruitment ==
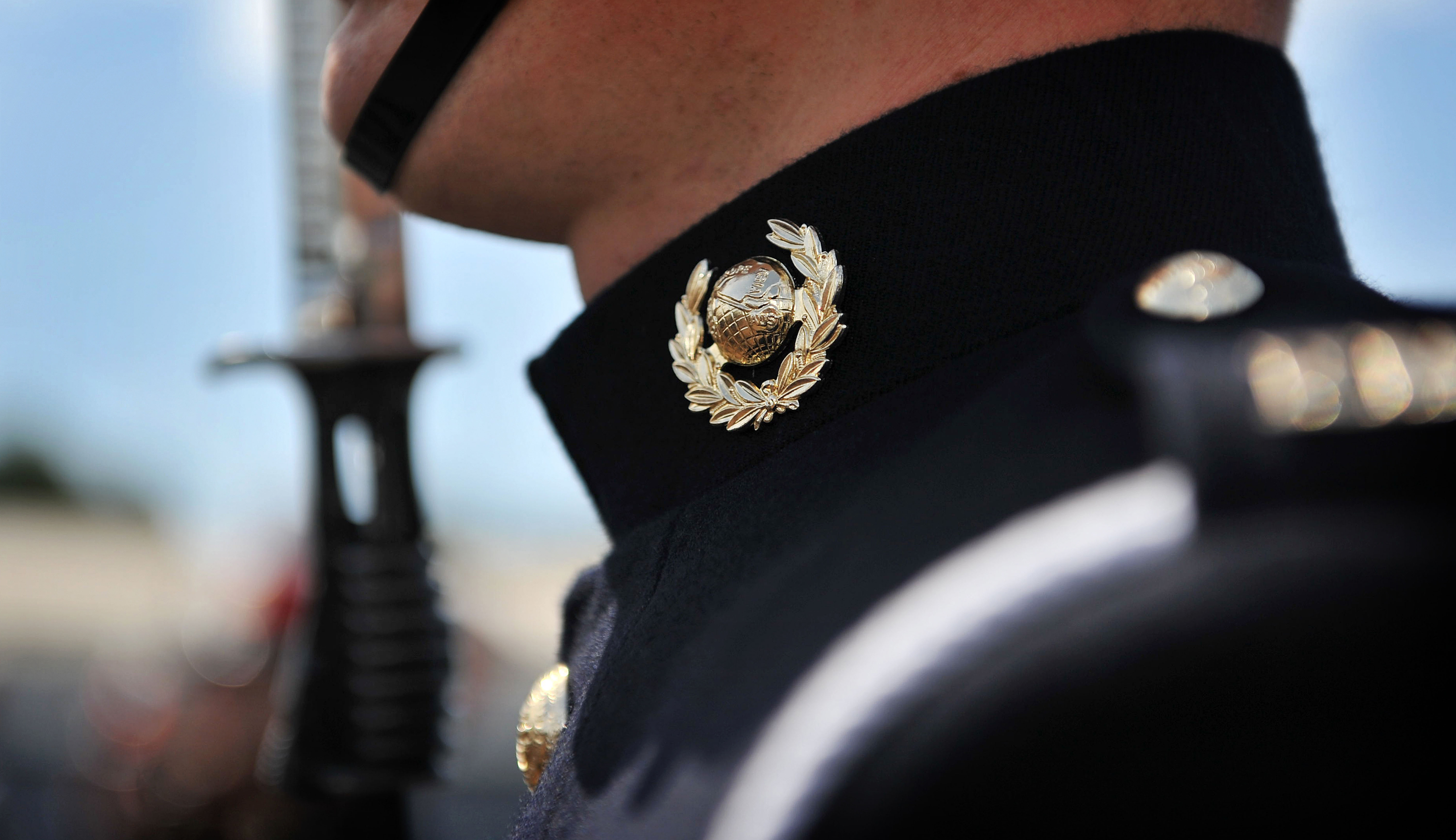
A newly qualified Royal Marine of 122 Troop Kings Squad is pictured during a passing out parade in 2011, having undergone the recruitment process and selection and training

All three services of the British Armed Forces recruit primarily from within the United Kingdom, although citizens from the Commonwealth of Nations and the Republic of Ireland are equally eligible to join. The minimum recruitment age is 16 years (although personnel may not serve on armed operations below 18 years, and if under 18 must also have parental consent to join); the maximum recruitment age depends whether the application is for a regular or reserve role; there are further variations in age limit for different corps/regiments. The normal term of engagement is 22 years; however, the minimum service required before resignation is 4 years, plus, in the case of the Army, any service person below the age of 18. A note to add is that in the United Kingdom, people may join the "Cadet Forces" such as the army cadets, Royal Air Force Air Cadets, or the sea and Royal Marine Cadets. Young people may join these organisations, which are either funded or affiliated with the MOD, from the age of 13-18. There is no obligation to then join the armed forces; however, it teaches key skills in both civilian and military life and is a key recruitment drive for the armed forces. At present, the yearly intake into the armed forces is 11,880 (per the 12 months to 31 March 2014).

Excluding the Brigade of Gurkhas and the Royal Irish Regiment, as of 1 April 2014, there are approximately 11,200 Black and Minority Ethnic (BME) persons serving as Regulars across the three service branches; of those, 6,610 were recruited from outside the United Kingdom. In total, Black and Minority Ethnic persons represent 7.1% of all service personnel, an increase from 6.6% in 2010.

Since the year 2000, sexual orientation has not been a factor considered in recruitment, and homosexuals can serve openly in the armed forces. All branches of the forces have actively recruited at Gay Pride events. The forces keep no formal figures concerning the number of gay and lesbian serving soldiers, saying that the sexual orientation of personnel is considered irrelevant and not monitored.

=== Role of women ===
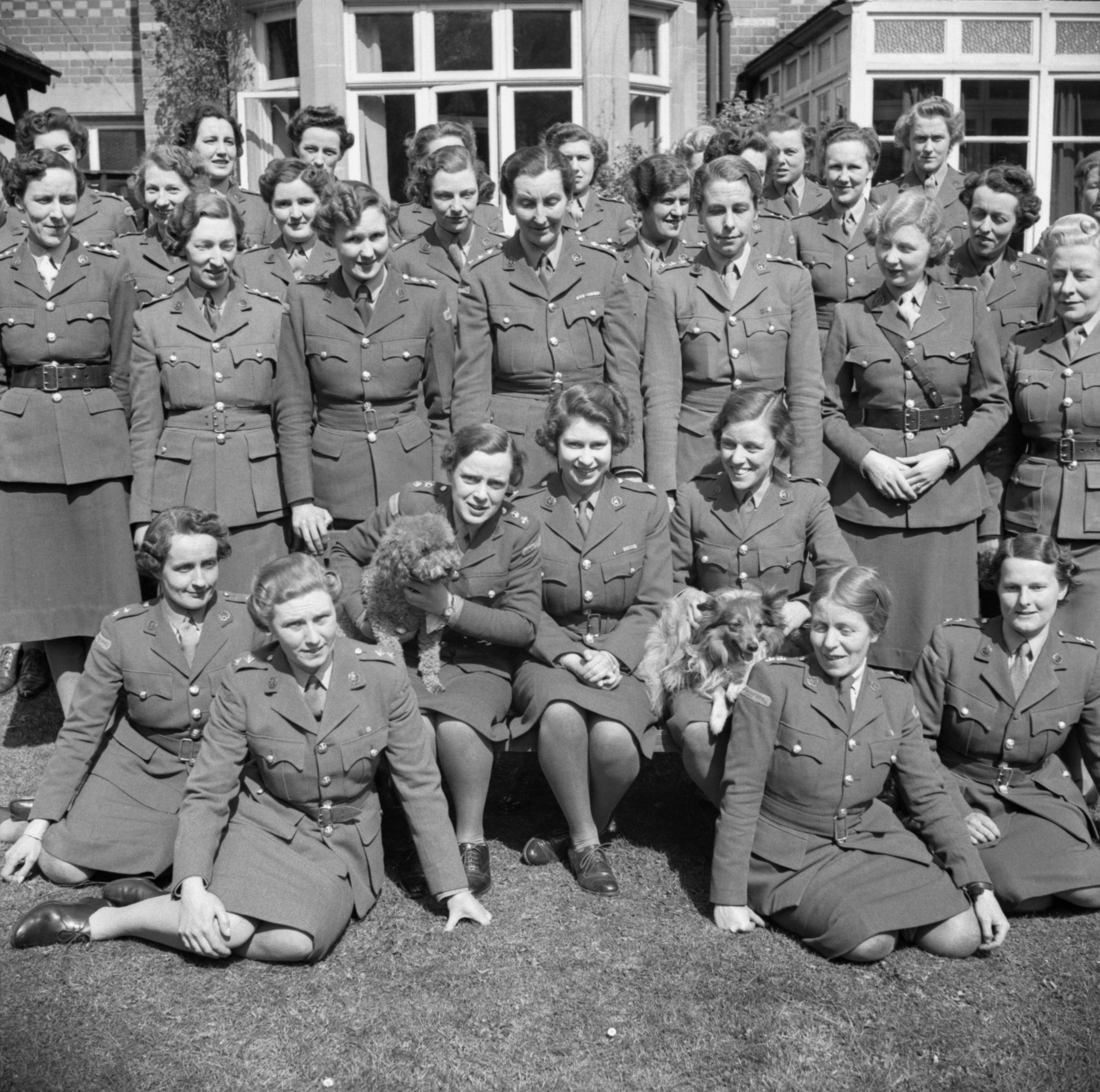
Princess Elizabeth (later Queen Elizabeth II) in the Auxiliary Territorial Service, April 1945

Women have been part of the armed forces, on and off, for centuries, more fully integrated since the early 1990s, including flying fast jets and commanding warships or artillery batteries. As of 1 April 2014, approximately 15,840 women were serving in the armed forces, representing 9.9% of all service personnel. The first female military pilot was Flight Lieutenant Julie Ann Gibson while Flight Lieutenant Jo Salter was the first fast-jet pilot, the latter flying a Tornado GR1 on missions patrolling the then Northern Iraqi No-Fly Zone. Flight Lieutenant Juliette Fleming and Squadron Leader Nikki Thomas recently were the first Tornado GR4 crew. While enforcing the Libyan No-Fly Zone, Flight Lieutenant Helen Seymour was identified as the first female Eurofighter Typhoon pilot.

In August 2011, it was announced that a female lieutenant commander, Sarah West, was to command the frigate HMS Portland. In July 2016, it was announced that women would be allowed to serve in close combat, starting with the Royal Armoured Corps. In July 2017, the Secretary of Defence announced that women would be allowed to enlist in the RAF Regiment from September 2017, a year ahead of schedule. In 2018, women were allowed to apply for all roles in the British military, including the special forces. As of 10 June 2024, the most senior serving woman is four-star General Dame Sharon Nesmith.

== See also ==
- Armed Forces Day (United Kingdom)
- Armed forces in Scotland
- Armed forces in Wales
- Atholl Highlanders – The only legal private army in Europe under the command of the Duke of Atholl in Scotland
- Banknotes of the British Armed Forces
- British Forces Broadcasting Service
- Community Cadet Forces
- List of military equipment of the United Kingdom
- Military Covenant – The mutual obligations between the nation and its Armed Forces.
- Network-enabled capability – British military concept of achieving enhanced military effect through the better use of information systems. Similar to the US concept of network-centric warfare.
- Structure of the British Armed Forces
- Uniforms of the British Armed Forces
- Military history of Scotland
