= Diz =

Diz may refer to:

== Places ==
- Diz, Khvoresh Rostam, Iran, a village
- Diz, Shahrud, Iran, a village

== People ==
- Adolfo Diz (1931–2008), Argentine economist
- Adrián Diz (born 1993), Cuban footballer
- Alejandro Diz (born 1965), Argentine former volleyball player
- Asier Etxaburu Diz (born 1994), Spanish footballer
- Facundo Diz (born 1979), Argentine footballer
- Francisco Diz (1910–1967), Spanish footballer
- Pedro Diz (born 1944), Argentine former swimmer
- Diz Disley (1931–2010), Anglo-Canadian jazz guitarist

== Others ==
- Diz, Hakkari, a historical Assyrian tribe in Hakkari, Turkey
- FILE_ID.DIZ, a small text file stored in a ZIP

== See also ==
- Dizzy (disambiguation)
- Dis (disambiguation)
