= Military history of Britain =

The Military history of Britain, including the military history of the United Kingdom and the military history of the island of Great Britain, is discussed in the following articles:

- Military history of England: the military history of the nations and tribes that inhabited or occupied the lands that make up England and Wales, before the creation of the United Kingdom under the Act of Union in 1707.
- Military history of Scotland: for the military history of Scotland since prehistoric times to today.
- Military history of the United Kingdom: since its formation in 1707.

== See also ==
- List of all military equipment current and former of the United Kingdom
- British Empire
- History of the Royal Navy
- History of the British Army
- History of the Royal Marines
- History of the Royal Air Force
- List of wars involving the United Kingdom
