= Banknotes of the British Armed Forces =

The British Armed Forces issued their own banknotes between 1946 and 1972.

At the end of the war in Europe in 1945, France, the United Kingdom, the United States and the Soviet Union agreed at the Potsdam Conference to split Germany into four occupation zones. The British area was occupied by the 21st Army Group that was collectively known as the British Army of the Rhine (BAOR). The Allies' job was challenging, forcing them to disband and disarm the German fighting machine, reassemble the country's basic infrastructure, and cope with population on the brink of starvation. To this end the BAOR operated as a country within a country, requiring a monetary system that functioned to serve the needs of the occupying forces. However, a problem soon emerged; goods intended for the troops were being sold to a thriving black market among the local population at highly inflated prices. Millions of pounds sterling were being depleted by the taxpayers of Britain. A series of stopgap measures slowed, but did not resolve the problem. It was decided in March 1946 that special military voucher system was necessary.

Historically, soldiers serving overseas had been paid in local currency rather than in their "home" currency, most cash drawn by soldiers would go directly into the local economy, and in a damaged economy the effects of a hard currency such as the pound circulating freely alongside weaker local currencies could be severely problematic, risking severe inflation. There were other problems as well; once pounds were circulating in a combat region, the opposing side could freely use its own stocks of pounds as currency, or acquire stocks for use elsewhere to support their war effort. The high purchasing power of the pound and its easy transference back to Britain also posed a significant incentive to the black marketers.

However, whilst the use of local currencies was effective where they were provided in cooperation with the local authorities, it was impractical in combat zones where the government might be either hostile, deliberately ambivalent, or simply non-existent. In these cases, the military authorities issued special "military currency", which was paid out to soldiers at a fixed rate of exchange and simply declared legal tender in occupied areas by local commanders.

After a remarkably brief period of preparation, the first series of 52,400,000 British Armed Forces Special Vouchers (BAFSV), valued at just over 10 million pounds sterling were printed by Thomas De La Rue and officially issued on August 1, 1946. In due course the ingenuity of the local population and the troops largely circumvented the intention of the first issue BAFSV's to slow black market activities. By mid 1947 it was decided, under a cloak of secrecy, to prepare a new issue to replace the first, then immediately demonetize the first to limit the conversion of illicitly-gained first series vouchers. This scheme was carried out on January 6, 1948, when the second issue was released.

The third series was printed in 1948 by J. Waddington Ltd, but were not issued until 1956 for use during the Suez Canal Crisis. This situation was quickly resolved over a two-month period and those notes withdrawn.

The fourth issue was originally discussed in 1952 but were not ordered until the heating up of the Cold War and the lack of a backup series prompted the British War Office in 1962 to design not only a fourth, but also a fifth series.

A new printer, Bradbury Wilkinson, was chosen for the job of producing these next two series: The fourth series was printed, but never issued, and according to all records, the fifth series was never printed. The sixth series, together with the 1 and 5 pound notes of the second series, were used in Berlin up to December 31, 1979, when they were finally withdrawn. On February 14, 1991, The Ministry of Defence auctioned off their stock of 17 million uncirculated vouchers from the 2nd, 3rd, 4th and 6th series to a consortium of dealers.

== 1st issue ==
This series of notes was issued in 1946 and obviously has no series indication.
The smallest denomination was 3 pence and the highest was 1 Pound.
Later on a second edition was made to replace this one.

== 2nd issue ==
This series was issued in 1948 and has the inscription '2nd Series' to indicate that it was a new issue.
The smallest denomination was 3 pence and the highest was 5 Pounds.

== 3rd issue ==
This series was issued in 1956 for use during the Suez Crisis, the smallest denomination was 3 pence and the highest was 1 Pound.

== 4th issue ==
This series dated from 1962 and has the inscription '4th Series'. It can be found on the top centre part of the one pound banknote. Some forms are rare.

== 5th issue ==
This series dating from the 1960s are rare known only in specimen form with a few proofs.

== 6th issue (1972) ==
This series has the inscription '6th Series' written on top of the banknote value number on one of the two faces.

It was released because the United Kingdom had changed over to decimal currency. There were three denominations - five pence, ten pence and fifty pence.

The denominations were expressed in 'New Pence' to distinguish it from the pre-decimal pence. Two banknote printers were employed to print these notes. They were Bradbury Wilkinson and Company, and Thomas de la Rue and Company.

== NAAFI canteen issue ==
These are notes of the 1st Series that were overprinted with a special overprint to indicate that they were for use only on ships of the Royal Navy. These notes are extremely sought after, especially by notaphilists, and can command some very strong prices.

== 'Pog' token issues ==
These small change tokens were issued for the use of the British troops deployed in Afghanistan and Iraq.

These are almost without exception in US cents, but in 2006 a very small number was issued in HQ ISAF Kabul, in euro cents. These were for use in the Afghanistan theatre only and later on were rarely seen as all the Post Exchanges around the KIA area accepted US dollars in payment. The NAAFIs in theatre did not accept sterling.

These tokens are not yet listed in Krause Publications' Standard Catalog of World Paper Money.

== See also ==
- Pound sterling
