= Defence Review =

Process by which government of the United Kingdom decides upon its overall defence policy

A Defence Review is the process by which government of the United Kingdom decides upon its overall defence policy and upon the means and resources devoted to achieving its defence objectives. Such reviews can happen when political or economic factors dictate, such as upon a change of Government. The Defence Review will normally result in the publication of a policy document, styled a White Paper and released to parliament as a Command paper, setting out the broad aims, objectives, and rationale for the policy and strategy.

== Post World War II Defence Reviews ==
The United Kingdom governmental carries out Defence Reviews infrequently, usually upon a change of government or major political event, such as just after the Collapse of Communism. They can also be necessitated by economic crises, as in 1974 and 2010.

British Defence Reviews since the end of World War II include:

- The Harwood Review, 1949 (Labour). This was neither announced nor published. It was an attempt by Labour to keep the defence estimates at an average of £700 million a year over 1950–1951–1952. It was discarded when the Korean War broke out in June 1950 leading to rearmament.
- The Chiefs of Staff Report on Defence Policy and Global Strategy, 1952. The Chiefs stressed to the Conservative government the primacy of the Cold War threat, stating, "The Free World is menaced everywhere by the implacable and unlimited aims of Soviet Russia." Predicting a prolonged Cold War it urged three priorities: action to win the Cold War, deterring the Cold War, preparing for war.
- 1957 Defence White Paper foreshadowed the end of national service, cut conventional forces, relied more on nuclear deterrence.
- 1966 Defence White Paper cancelled the BAC TSR2 strike and reconnaissance warplane as a replacement for V-bombers; announced plan to purchase American F-111 warplanes instead.
- 1968 Healy, Mark II, announced a withdrawal from East of Suez, and cancellation of orders for F111.
- 1974 Defence White Paper (also known as the Mason review), Labour announced plans to concentrate on NATO central front, anti-submarine warfare, home defense, and nuclear deterrence, with a resumption of cuts to forces East of Suez after a hiatus on such cuts from 1970 to 1974 during the Heath Government.
- 1981 Defence White Paper (also known as the John Nott review)
- 1990 Options for Change
- 1994 Front Line First
- 1998 Strategic Defence Review
- Strategic Defence and Security Review 2010
- Strategic Defence and Security Review 2015
- 2021 Integrated Review and Defence in a Competitive Age
- 2025 Strategic Defence Review

== Other Defence Policy Statements ==
United Kingdom governments have also conducted policy reviews which cover specific aspects of defence but do not purport to be fundamental reappraisals of overall defence policy and strategy. Examples of these include:

- Front Line First
- SDR New Chapter
- Delivering Security in a Changing World
- Defence Industrial Strategy

== Comparison with the United States ==
The main difference between the United Kingdom Ministry of Defence and the United States Department of Defense as pertains to the review cycle is frequency. The U.S. DoD carries out its review, styled the Quadrennial Defense Review, on a set four-year cycle, whereas the UK MoD has no set timetable for any such review.
