= Diss =

Diss or DISS may refer to:

- Diameter index safety system (DISS), a medical gas connection standard
- Disrespect, to show contempt, the act of despising, or having lack of respect
- Diss, Norfolk, a market town in England
  - Diss railway station
  - Diss Rugby Club
  - Diss Town F.C.
- Diss, Alberta, a place in Canada
- Diss grass, a Mediterranean grass
- Diss track, a song whose primary purpose is to verbally attack someone else, usually another artist
- Department of Internal State Security, a fictional organization from the 2009 film District 13: Ultimatum
- Smaïl Diss (born 1976), Algerian football player
- Dissertation

== See also ==
- Dis (disambiguation)
- Disrespect
