= Dis (skipper) =

Scientific classification
- Kingdom: Animalia
- Phylum: Arthropoda
- Class: Insecta
- Order: Lepidoptera
- Family: Hesperiidae
- Genus: Dis

Genus of butterflies

Dis is a genus of skippers in the butterfly family Hesperiidae.
