= Dili International School =

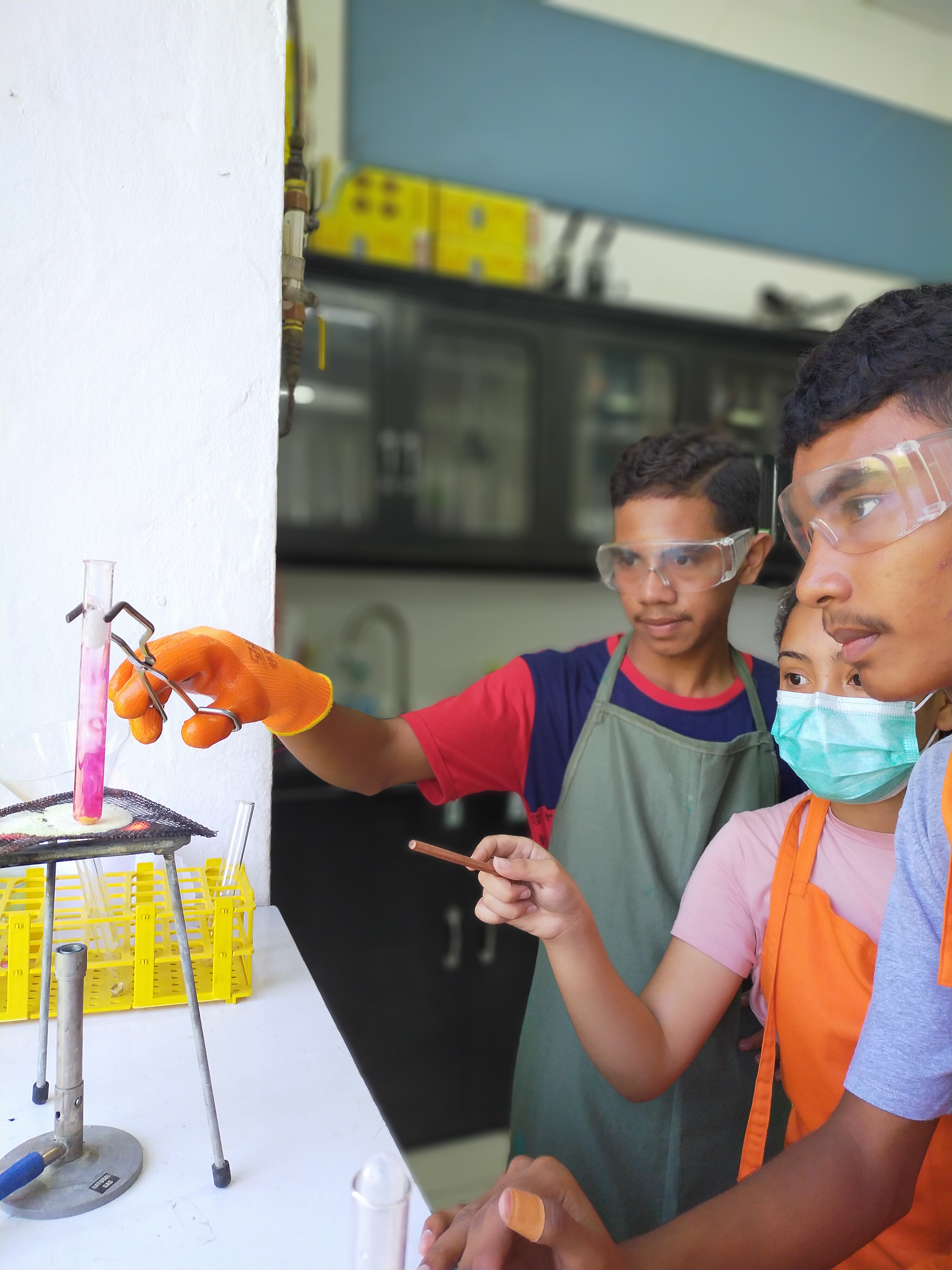
- Students learning in the science laboratory

Location
- Dili; Timor-Leste; 8.55181°S 125.54349°E

Information
- Other name: DIS
- Type: International school
- Established: 2002; 24 years ago
- Founders: Carmel Bates
- Educational authority: Timor-Leste Ministry of Education, Youth and Sports
- Accreditations: International Baccalaureate Organisation; Victorian Curriculum and Assessment Authority
- Affiliation: Haileybury, Melbourne
- Website: www.distimor.org

Dili International School is an international English-language school situated in Dili, the capital of Timor-Leste. Dili International School is accredited with the International Baccalaureate Organisation, the Victorian Curriculum and Assessment Authority, and the Timor-Leste Ministry of Education, Youth and Sports.

== Overview ==
Dili International School was conceived in 2002 by a group of parents who were either visiting or living in Timor-Leste, and home schooling their children. There was agreement that a school was necessary to accommodate the tiny international community and East Timorese families requiring English language education. A resident Australian family, Tony Haritos and Carmel Bates, took up the organisational and funding challenge and in February 2003 Dili International School commenced operations as a multi-age primary school. Later that year in May, a Preschool class was created. A Playgroup was formed in June 2004, providing a much needed early childhood facility. Two years later in January 2006, the school expanded to include a Distance Education Support Program for students in secondary grades and a specialist Secondary English as a Foreign Language class. Enrolments continued to increase until the 2006 East Timorese crisis, which saw a decline in numbers as families left East Timor either voluntarily or at the urging of their employers and governments. The existing DIS stakeholders - owners, staff and families have to overcome great hardships to keep the school open through these very difficult times.

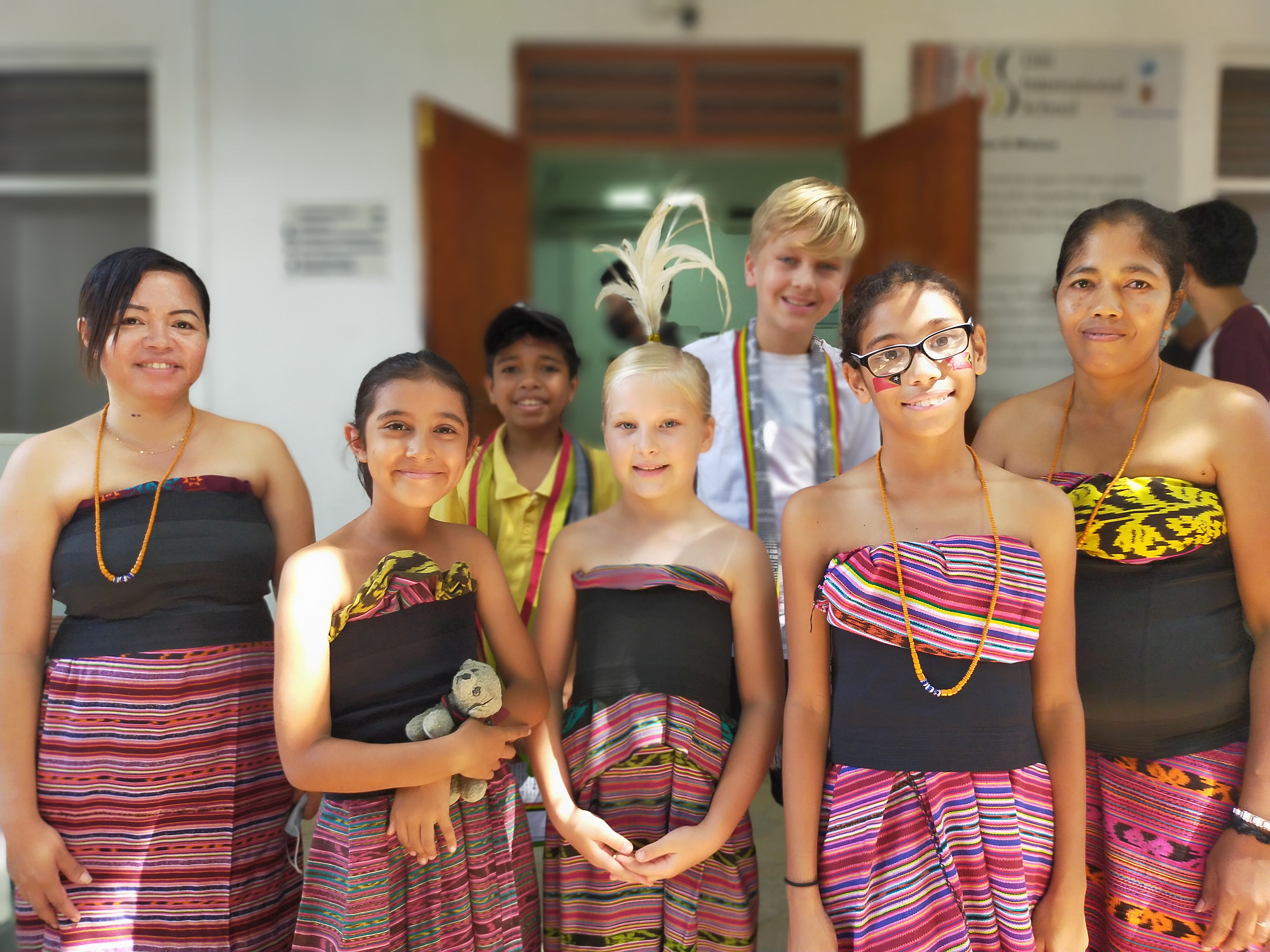
Dili International Students learn about local Timorese culture and celebrate cultural diversity.

In 2012, Dili International School was authorised as an International Baccalaureate World School. DIS is the only school in Timor-Leste authorised to offer an IB programme. In April 2013, DIS was accredited by the Victorian Curriculum and Assessment Authority to offer the Victorian Certificate of Education in partnership with Haileybury in Melbourne. This has given the school a globally recognised high school leaving certificate. In October 2022, Dili International School signed a Memorandum of understanding with Charles Darwin University that promotes educational exchange between the two organisations as well as establishes a scholarship programme for Timorese graduates of Dili International School to study at Charles Darwin University.

In 2023, Dili International School founder and director, Carmel Bates, was awarded the Order of Timor-Leste by President Jose Ramos Horta, for her service and contribution towards education development in Timor-Leste.
