= Dolisie Airport =

Dolisie Airport Ngot Nzoungou Airport
- IATA: DIS; ICAO: FCPD

Summary
- Airport type: Public
- Serves: Dolisie, Republic of the Congo
- Elevation AMSL: 1,070 ft / 326 m
- Coordinates: 4°12′22″S 12°39′35″E

Map
- Location of airport in the Republic of the Congo

Runways
Direction	Length		Surface
Direction	m	ft	Surface
14/32	2,050	6,726	Asphalt
- Source: GCM Google Maps

Dolisie Airport (IATA: DIS, ICAO: FCPD) is an airport serving the city of Dolisie, Republic of the Congo. The city was known as Loubomo until 1991.

The Dolisie non-directional beacon (Ident: LO) is located on the field.

== See also ==
- List of airports in the Republic of the Congo
- Transport in the Republic of the Congo
