= Ad-Dis ash-Sharqiyah =

- Location in Yemen
- Coordinates: 14°53′N 49°52′E
- Country: Yemen
- Governorate: Hadhramaut Governorate
- Time zone: UTC+3 (Yemen Standard Time)

Ad-Dis ash-Sharqiyah is a village in eastern Yemen. It is located in the Hadhramaut Governorate.
