= Ad Dis district =

- District
- Interactive map of Ad Dis district
- Coordinates: 15°05′N 50°00′E
- Country: Yemen
- Governorate: Hadhramaut

Population (2021)
  - Total: 36,605
- Time zone: UTC+3 (Yemen Standard Time)

Ad Dis district is a district of the Hadhramaut Governorate, Yemen. As of 2021, the district had a population of 36,605 inhabitants.
