= List of military equipment of the United Kingdom =

This is a list of all military equipment ever used by the United Kingdom which includes land equipment, ships and aircraft. This includes lists of specific types of current and former military equipment of the UK, and military equipment lists for certain periods such as World War II.

== Land equipment ==
- List of military weapons of the United Kingdom

== Aircraft ==
- List of all aircraft current and former of the United Kingdom
- List of all naval aircraft current and former of the United Kingdom

== Ships ==
- List of all naval vessels current and former of the United Kingdom
- List of equipment in the Royal Navy

== World War II ==
- List of British military equipment of World War II
