= Defence Industrial Strategy =

Defence Industrial Strategy may refer to:

- Defence Industrial Strategy (2005), a former United Kingdom government policy statement
- Defence Industrial Strategy (2025), for which the Minister of State for Defence Readiness and Industry is responsible
