= Reserve Forces and Cadets Association =

Reserve Forces' and Cadets' Associations (RFCAs) are Crown bodies in the United Kingdom which give advice and assistance to the Defence Council, and to the Army, Royal Navy and Royal Air Force, on matters that concern reserves and cadets. They are contracted by the Ministry of Defence to provide services including management of the volunteer estate, employer support, cadets and youth and to establish and maintain links with the civilian community. Established in 1908 (known then as the County Associations), they are today organised as 13 regional associations, comprising voluntary members and a small full-time secretariat.

Their governing body is the RFCA Council which coordinates their budgets and policies, and is composed of the thirteen voluntary regional chairs. It has a professional chief executive for the council and there is one for each of the 13 regional RFCAs. All key posts have to be approved by the Defence Council but, as a ‘grass roots’ organisation, the names of the voluntary chairs and other officers are submitted after election by the membership, rather than through civil service nomination via the Office of the Commissioner for Public Appointments. The chairman of the council has access to the Secretary of State.

== History ==
County Associations were established on 1 April 1908 by the Territorial and Reserve Forces Act 1907 to administer the volunteer forces in each county, when the Volunteers and Yeomanry were brought together to form the Territorial Force(TF). The roles of the associations included recruiting, provision and maintenance of buildings and ranges for reserves, arrangements with employers and establishment and support of cadet units. Lord Haldane set them up as he recognised that the War Office and Regular Army had limited links with the civilian world; they helped to fulfil his wider vision of a ‘Nation in Arms’, by ‘building a military structure which shall have its foundations in the nation itself.’ The Associations were: "To render advice and assistance to the military authorities -"the fund of local knowledge possessed by an Association is to be held for the information of the Army Council and of the officers of the Military Commands at need."

The organisation of the Territorial Force in 1907/08 kept the "provinces of command and administration … rigidly distinct…" explained by the fact "that, whereas command and training to be efficient must be centralized, the administration of citizen forces raised on a voluntary basis can only be efficient if it is decentralized. Unity of command and, to some extent, unity of training are essential to success in the field, but diversity and elasticity in administration are no less essential to the encouragement of local effort and the development of local resources in time of peace."

The act was piloted through Parliament in the face of opposition from many quarters including some Conservatives and retired generals arguing for conscription, Labour and pacifist minded-Liberals who were against ‘militarising’ the nation and militia and volunteers opposed to perceived threats to their independence.

The Act provided that each would have the lord-lieutenant of the county as the president and required that at least half of the membership would consist of officers drawn from all branches of the Territorial Force] (or, preceding that, the Yeomanry and Volunteers). Haldane’s plan for local councillors to be compulsorily included were dropped after a political battle, but "Where desirable", members were also to include representatives of the county councils, county borough councils, and universities within the area of the Association, as well as co-opted members representative "of the interests of employers and workmen". From the outset, members elected their officers who appointed each (paid) association secretary who acted as chief executive, although they had to be approved by the Army Council

In June that year, the county associations set up the Council of County Territorial Associations., composing key elected figures from each county association to provide a public voice on behalf of the Territorial Force.

At the outset of the First World War, Kitchener denounced the TF as a ‘town clerks army’ and set up a process for recruiting a parallel organisation of service units (soon called ‘Kitchener units’) for the Regular Army, The county associations and their parliamentary supporters pressed the government to mobilise the Territorial Force and Kitchener agreed that those opting for overseas service should be deployed, with the first units leaving within weeks. Six divisions were deployed to France by April 1915, while the Kitchener formations were still training. General Sir John French, General officer commanding the BEF said ‘Without the assistance which the Territorials afforded between October 1914 and June 1915, it would have been impossible to hold the line in France and Belgium. Besides administering and expanding the Territorial Force, a number of county associations, including Cambridgeshire and East Riding, raised formations for Kitchener's New Armies.

After the First World War, the TF was disbanded and the county associations led the campaign to re-establish it as the Territorial Army(TA), and fought for resources for the TA and cadet forces during the depression when bounties were slashed. In the build-up to the Second World War, the county associations played a critical role in the expansion of the TA.

In 1966, as part of its sweeping cuts to the TA, the government reorganised the county associations into first 23 and then 14 regional Territorial, Auxiliary and Volunteer Reserve associations. The TAVRAs re-established their central body as the Council of TAVRAs. As the Council campaigned against the large reductions in Territorials, supported by six field marshals with service from the 2nd World War, officials in the Ministry of Defence became so exasperated that the Permanent Under Secretary for the Army was heard referring to the vice-chairs of the Council as the chairman’s "henchmen"

In 1996, a new Reserve Forces Act was passed which made important changes including on arrangements for mobilising reserve forces. The Act restated the legal basis of the TAVRAs although much of the detail was remarkably similar to earlier legislation, back to the original 1907 Act. As before, key posts were to be elected by members. All important posts, including elected chairs and the (paid) executive secretaries, had to be confirmed by the Defence Council (which had replaced the three single service councils, with the amalgamation of the single service ministries into the Ministry of Defence in 1964. As before, one of the county Lord Lieutenants within each region was appointed as president of each RFCA.

In 1998, the new government was considering the virtual abolition of the remaining reserve forces and the TAVRAs played a central role in testifying to the value of reserve forces, including to the House of Commons Defence Select Committee In 2000 the name was changed to Reserve Forces and Cadets Associations to reflect the new tri-service structure. The number of associations was reduced from 14 to 13. In the Defence Reform Act 2014, the RFCAs were given a new power to produce an annual independent report for Parliament on the condition of the reserve forces.

== Roles ==
RFA 96 requires the RFCAS to provide 2 general duties: to give advice and assistance to the Defence Council and to conform to the Defence Plan. They are responsible for providing advice and support on behalf of the UK’s volunteer reserve forces and cadets. They work with the chains of command of the 3 services to deliver support to the reserves and cadet against Service Level Agreements.

Through professionally qualified staff, they are responsible on behalf of the Ministry of Defence (MOD) for the upkeep of the volunteer estate, some 460 tri-service reserve forces’ sites, 2,300 cadet centres and a number of training areas. They maintain the estate to the required legal standard, aiming to ensure that all sites are kept in good condition, fit for purpose and secure. Through their estate expertise and local knowledge, they aim to provide an attractive environment in which to recruit, train and ‘refresh the spirit of our volunteers.

The RFCAs also provide the support requirements for the delivery of the service cadet experience by providing the permanent support staff who maintain and run the Army Cadet County HQs, the safety assurance staff who ensure safe training, the material support through the buildings and training areas that cadets use for their activities and financial support to deliver those activities. They also provide support to reservists of all services through the Defence Relationship Management Organisation that provides the interface between the military and those employers who have reserves on their staff, those who seek more information or those who are supporting reserves whilst on operational deployment.

The RFCA support the MOD by providing visibility of reserve and cadet issues and solutions. They have a statutory role to report to ministers. Reserves and Cadets are based in the local community at a time when the regular forces are increasingly concentrated on a handful of garrisons, bases and stations. They have a critical role in establishing and maintaining links with the community and delivering employer engagement on behalf of Defence. In 2014, an independent review of the RFCAs commented: "RFCAs’ network and strong local communication linkages are key assets for MOD in its regional engagement and should be further exploited."

The latest independent review (in 2019) commented: "A key strength of the RFCAs is their extensive volunteer membership (numbering around 8000), bringing with it a wide breadth of expertise and community links – without which the RFCAs would unlikely have access to the information and knowledge needed to discharge the duties. This mirrors the clear passion of RFCA staff for their roles to provide a crucial and coherent voice for Reserves and Cadets across the UK. Their position as the link between Defence and the wider public, continuity of staff and expertise, and tri-Service drive enables the RFCAs to deliver across all functions, particularly community and employer engagement (the latter proven by the success on the Armed Forces Covenant and Employer Recognition Scheme work strands). This is particularly valuable in cases where local knowledge and understanding may be limited in MOD"

The most recent statutory role of the RFCAs was bestowed on them in the 2014 Defence Reform Act, to. prepare an annual report on the state of the volunteer reserve forces. These are prepared by the External Scrutiny Panel established by the RFCA Council, whose reports are lodged with the House of Commons Library

== Organisation ==
Thirteen autonomous RFCAs exist nationwide, consisting of some 8,000 volunteer members, with a wide cross section of expertise in financial and legal affairs, estate management, marketing and PR, employer support, youth matters and local government. All are advocates of Defence and represent their local communities. They provide a civilian network of support across the nation.

Each RFCA is allocated a budget solely to provide support to Reserve Forces and Cadets. Priorities are agreed with the respective Service Headquarters and managed by the RFCA concerned. Through the expertise of their members, RFCAs are able to bring added value to the Defence effort.

Each RFCA employs a small secretariat of full-time Crown Servants to serve its members and maintain the link between the civilian community and the Services. Each chief executive, like the elected officers, has to be agreed by the Defence Council.

=== Council of RFCAs ===
Additionally, a Council of RFCAs (CRFCA) has been constituted by the 13 individual RFCAs, under the direction of the Defence Council in order to provide a central coordination and a focus to enable the Associations to fulfil the requirements of their customers within resources. The Council's tasks include:

- Collect, compile and disseminate information relevant to the Reserve Forces and the service cadet organisations to all the constituent Associations.
- Examine, consult upon and report about any matters submitted to it by the Ministry of defence or other relevant bodies.
- Represent to the Ministry of Defence, or other relevant bodies, the collective opinion of the Council on any matter relating to the statutory duties of the constituent Associations.
- Take any such action as may be decided by the Council for the attainment of its object.
- Take action on any relevant matter at the request of one or more associations, or the Ministry of Defence.

=== Proposed Future Structure ===
An independent review of the RFCAs in 2014 included strong praise for the RFCAs’ local footprint and delivery skills, recommending that the "Arms Length Body (ALB) status of CRFCA and RFCAs should be maintained – providing an essential ‘external’ perspective of MOD’s Reserve & cadet activity", and that "RFCAs’ network and strong local communication linkages are key assets for MOD in its regional engagement and should be further exploited." In setting out new tasks, it recommended their "agility and local knowledge" be made available to the Defence Infrastructure Organisation "not only in the delivery of infrastructure support, but also in assisting DIO as an ‘Intelligent Advisor’ in managing future estate rationalisation and improvements and that their external scrutiny tasks for reserves be extended to cadets."

The next review, in 2019, took a different tack. It acknowledged the strengths of the RFCAs, saying: “Stakeholders were generally very positive about delivery of the main RFCA functions whilst accepting the need for more clarity on roles, objectives and performance levels. Where the relationships work well at the regional level, a great deal is achieved and there are numerous success stories across the RFCAs’ functions. There is reasonable appetite among the RFCAs and customers (up to 3*) to explore new tasks that could be taken on – subject to addressing extant issues, such as corporate governance, finance, and HR. There are particular opportunities around Reserve and Cadet estate optimisation, community engagement, and providing regional support to the new Office of Veterans’ Affairs.” It also particularly highlighted the importance of the membership saying: “A key strength of the RFCAs is their extensive volunteer membership (numbering around 8000), bringing with it a wide breadth of expertise and community links – without which the RFCAs would unlikely have access to the information and knowledge needed to discharge the duties.” (See full quote in the chapter on Roles above).

Yet the document recommends that MoD should “Regularise and streamline the CRFCA and 13 RFCA ALBs into a Single Executive Non-Departmental Public Body”. This is justified by the summary on the grounds that “there are inconsistencies in how the RFCAs operate across the regions and their relationship with the MOD needs clarifying and strengthening.”

In his foreword to the review, James Heappey, Minister of State for the Armed Forces, paid tribute to the RFCAs: "The RFCAs are trusted partners of the Ministry of Defence (MOD) and they have been instrumental in delivering a large number of Defence priorities on behalf of Government, not least the Future Reserves 2020 (FR20) white paper and the Cadet Expansion Programme (CEP)", and "I was delighted to see the Review’s praise for the RFCAs’ passion to deliver beyond expectations." He said that the government "fully supports the recommendations the Review makes about how the RFCAs can develop their effectiveness, efficiency, and corporate governance" and will now "consider how best to deliver this, including how to regularise the 14 existing bodies following the usual, separate, government approval process." He also called for increased focus on a number of factors including financial resilience and diversity.

During a subsequent debate in the House of Lords, the President of the RFCA Council, Lord de Mauley, showed concern at the apparent contradiction between praise for the performance of this volunteer-led, regional structure and proposing a centralised quango. "Were the draft report’s proposals to go through, they would drive a coach and horses through valuable links to civic society which are at the heart of the Armed Forces covenant—one of the few remaining areas of policy where there is a broad consensus across Parliament and the devolved Administrations…The national and regional councils should remain volunteer-led, rather than a de facto extension of the MoD. The changes proposed in the review would, in my judgment, fatally undermine the very strengths that the report extols and seeks to preserve." His remarks were supported by almost all the speakers in the debate, on all sides.

The minister, Baroness Goldie, paid tribute to the RFCAs, but raised concerns about a lack of diversity and argued that the "nub of the issue" is that the status quo "results in a situation whereby decisions on spending public money can be—and in some cases are being—taken by some persons who are not accountable to the MoD Permanent Secretary, who is the department’s principal accounting officer, with all the consequent legal responsibilities of that office."

== Scope ==
=== Maritime Reserve ===
Provision and maintenance of on-shore accommodation for the RNR and RMR as required.

=== Army Reserve ===
- Recruiting and publicity for units of the AR.
- Provision and maintenance of accommodation for AR Independent units and the furnishing, lighting and cleaning of such accommodation.
- Liaison with employers, trades unions and local authorities and relations with the public.
- Administration and maintenance of training areas and ranges vested in them.
- Welfare.

=== Royal Auxiliary Air Force ===
- Provision and maintenance of accommodation for RAuxAF units as required and the furnishing, lighting and cleaning of such accommodation.
- Recruiting, publicity, welfare and liaison as appropriate.

=== Sea Cadet Corps ===
Liaison responsibilities and assistance, where possible, with the provision of accommodation.

=== Combined Cadet Force ===
All accommodation matters.

=== Army Cadet Force ===
- The organisation of the ACF, subject to any directions which the Defence Council may give.
- Recommendations for the appointment of Honorary Colonels and Cadet Commandants (ACF).
- The grant of paid acting promotion in the ranks of Captain and Major within establishment.
- The appointment of Adult Instructors and their promotion within establishment.
- Provision, furnishing and maintenance of accommodation.
- Provision of non-public equipment and stores.
- Issue, storage, maintenance and accounting of public stores.
- General supervision of the administration of private funds.
- Recruiting, local publicity and promotion of good relations with the public.
- Encouraging co-operation and good relations between the Reserve Forces and the ACF.

=== Air Training Corps ===
Provision and maintenance of accommodation.

== See also ==
- Volunteer Reserves (United Kingdom)

== Sources ==
- Baker, Harold (1909). The Territorial Force, A Manual of its Law. Organization and Administration, with an introduction by Rt Hon RB Haldane KC MP. London: John Murray.
- Beckett, Ian (2008). Territorials, A century of Service. Plymouth: DRA Publishing.
- Beckett, Ian, Bowman, Timothy and Connelly, Mark (2017). The British Army in the First World War. Cambridge: Cambridge University Press.
- Campbell, John (2020). Haldane: The Forgotten Statesman Who Shaped Modern Britain. London: Hurst & Co.
- Dennis, Peter (1987). The Territorial Army. Woodbridge: The Royal Historical Society: Boydell Press.
- Godley, Hugh (1914). Manual of Military Law (Sixth ed.). London: War Office.
- Simkins, Peter (2007) [1988]. Kitchener's Army: The Raising of the New Armies 1914–1916. Barnsley: Pen & Sword Military. ISBN 978-1-844-15585-9.
- "Review of the Reserve Forces' and Cadets' Associations 2014" (PDF). 16 December 2014. p. 2.
- "Review of the Reserve Forces' and Cadets' Associations 2019" (PDF). 2019.
