= Armed forces in Wales =

Overview of the British Armed Forces operating in Wales

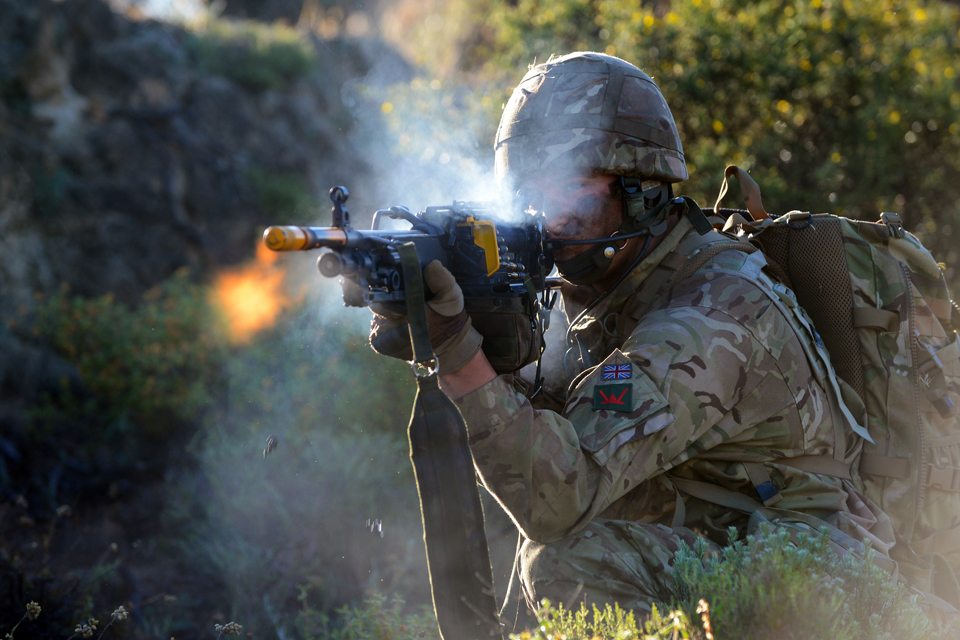
A soldier of the British Army's, Royal Welsh regiment, during training in Cyprus.

The Armed forces in Wales are the military bases and organisation in Wales or associated with Wales. This includes servicemen and women from Wales and the wider British Armed Forces.

The Military in Wales includes the three services. The Army (regular and reserve) has bases in various locations across Wales, the RAF is primarily represented by RAF Valley on Anglesey (Ynys Môn) with a reserve Squadron in Cardiff and the Navy also has a Reserve Unit in Cardiff.

Out of the armed services, the Army has the largest presence in Wales, with over 1,400 personnel. 3,230 military and civilian personnel are based in Wales. There were also over 60 Ministry of Defence establishments and bases; including reserve centres and training facilities.

In the 2021 census, around 115,000 people in Wales reported that they had previously served in the armed forces, around 4.5% of usual residents in Wales aged 16 years or older.

== The British Army in Wales ==
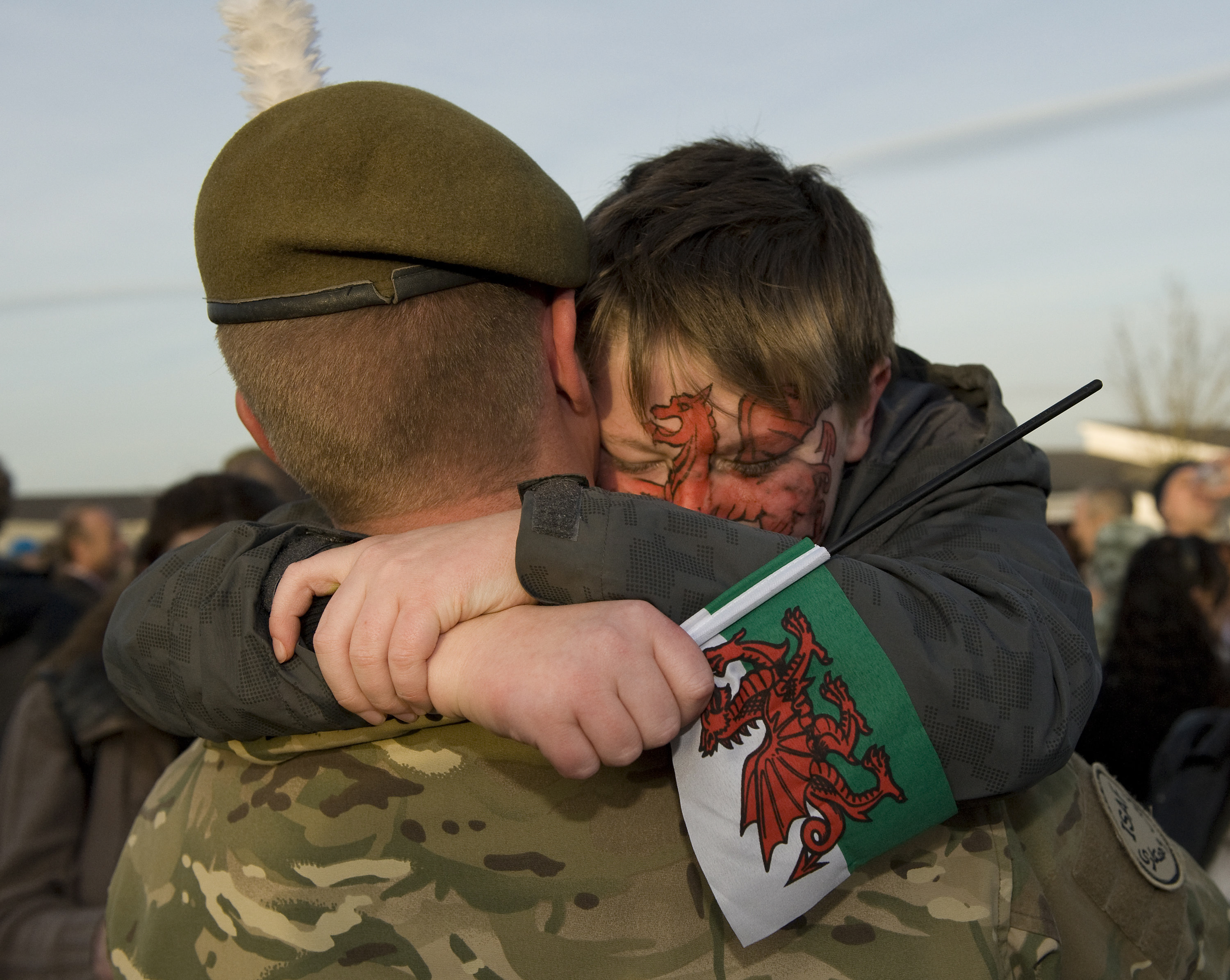
Returning Welsh soldier (2nd Battalion, Royal Welsh) greeted by his son

In 2018, there were 3,280 military and civilian personnel based in Wales composed of 2,210 military personnel and 1,080 civilian staff. Out of the armed services, the Army has the largest presence in Wales, with over 1,400 personnel based there. As of 2019, there were 3,230 military and civilian personnel based in Wales. There were also over 60 Ministry of Defence establishments and bases; including reserve centres and training facilities. Andrew Dawes is commander of the 160th Welsh Brigade and Head of the army in Wales. Newport will be hosting the annual Wales National Armed Forces Day on Saturday 24 June 2023 which is a partnership between the Welsh Government, councils and the navy, army and air force. Since 2021 the day travels across all Welsh regions.

=== Welsh Brigade ===
160th (Wales) Brigade formation sign.

The Welsh Brigade was founded in 1908, and served in both World Wars as part of the 53rd (Welsh) Infantry Division. Welsh Brigade is responsible for field operations rather than regimental operations. The brigade is also known for Exercise Cambrian Patrol. The headquarters of the brigade is the 160th (Welsh) Brigade (Welsh: Brigâd 160 (Cymru)) which is responsible for the delivery of UK Ops within Wales.

Located in Wales, within the Brigade:

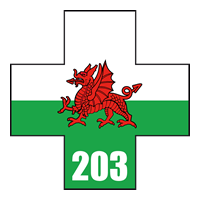
203 (Welsh) Field Hospital logo.

- 1st Battalion The Rifles
- 3rd Battalion The Royal Welsh
- 14 Signal Regiment (Electronic Warfare)
- 104 Regiment Royal Artillery
- 157 (Welsh) Regiment RLC
- 203 Field Hospital
- Infantry Battle School
- Royal Monmouthshire Royal Engineers
- Wales UOTCC

==== Exercise Cambrian Patrol ====
Exercise Cambrian Patrol is organised and carried out by the Headquarters of 160th (Welsh) Brigade, based in Brecon. Originally the exercise was designed by a group of Welsh Territorial Army soldiers as a weekend training event including a long march over the Cambrian Mountains, finishing with a shooting match on Sennybridge training area.

Exercise Cambrian Patrol has been held annually since 1959, developing worldwide recognition as NATO’s toughest patrolling test. Regular, Reserve and University Training Officer Corps teams now participate, in addition to 20 patrols representing international armies. The exercise is considered to be unique and at a world-class standard. It is also the largest of this type of exercise. Some foreign entrants must win their won domestic competition in order to gain a place on the patrol.

==== Joint Military Command Wales ====
The Joint Military Command Wales (JMC Wales) based at the Army headquarters in Brecon was active during the response to the COVID-19 pandemic in Wales in supporting NHS Wales. The commander of JMC Wales is the Head of the Army in Wales and the Welsh Brigade, Andrew Dawes.

Andrew Dawes. He said in February 2021, "It continues to be a tremendous privilege to support NHS Wales in any way we can during this latest stage of the pandemic response. They have asked us to help crew Welsh ambulances and to deliver the vaccine right across Wales. We currently have several hundred service personnel involved in these tasks. Alongside this there specialist planners and liaison officers in Welsh Government, NHS Wales, the regional Health Boards, as well as supporting the regional resilience networks across the length and breadth of Wales."

=== Royal Welsh ===
Motto: Gwell Angau na Chywilydd / Better Death than Dishonour

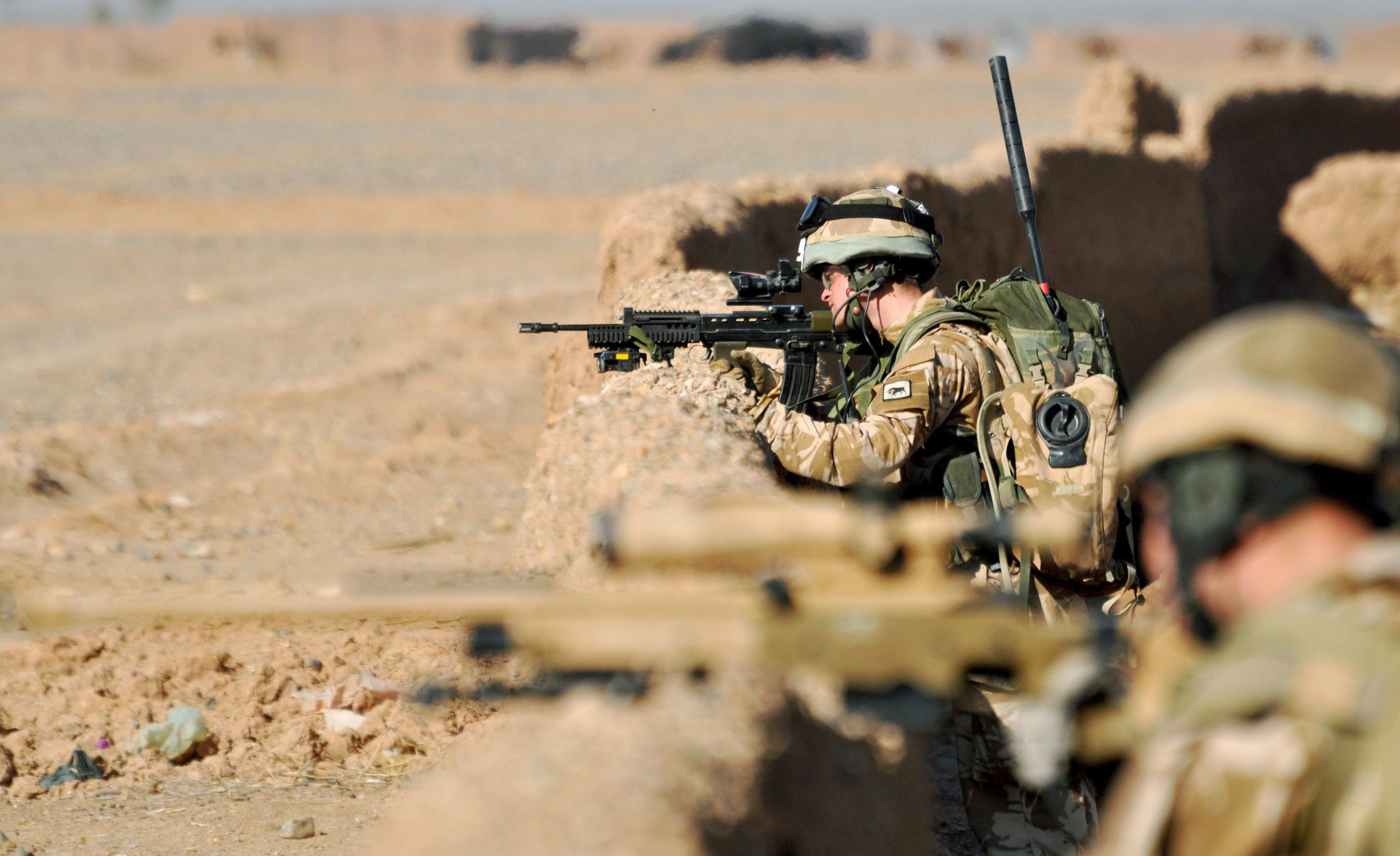
Soldiers from the Mobility Reconnaissance Force of 1 Royal Welsh take up a defensive position north of Patrol Base Wahid, Nad-E' Ali, Helmand during a patrol.

The Royal Welsh is a large infantry regiment that was formed on St David's Day 2006 by merging The Royal Regiment of Wales (24th/41st Foot) and The Royal Welch Fusiliers. The regiment was composed of two battalions, one armoured infantry and one light infantry, as well as a reserve battalion. The regiment has a famous goat mascot, which is sometimes referred to as a ranking soldier. In April 2014, the 2nd Battalion was merged into the 1st Battalion to form a single armoured infantry battalion. The 3rd Battalion now serves as light infantry in the Army Reserve.

==== Deployments ====
- April 2006: 1st Bn (Battalion) deployed to Cyprus.
- October 2007–April 2008: 1st Bn deployed to Afghanistan.
- October 2009–April 2012: 1st Bn deployed to Afghanistan for operational tours.
- May 2007–November 2007: 2nd Bn deployed to Iraq during Operation Telic.
- Between 2009 and 2011: 2nd Bn sent individual companies to Helmand in Afghanistan

Since 2011, the Armoured Infantry Battalion has been deployed in operations and training exercises in: Somalia, Estonia, Ukraine, Germany, Kenya, Canada and the United States.

=== The Welsh Cavalry ===
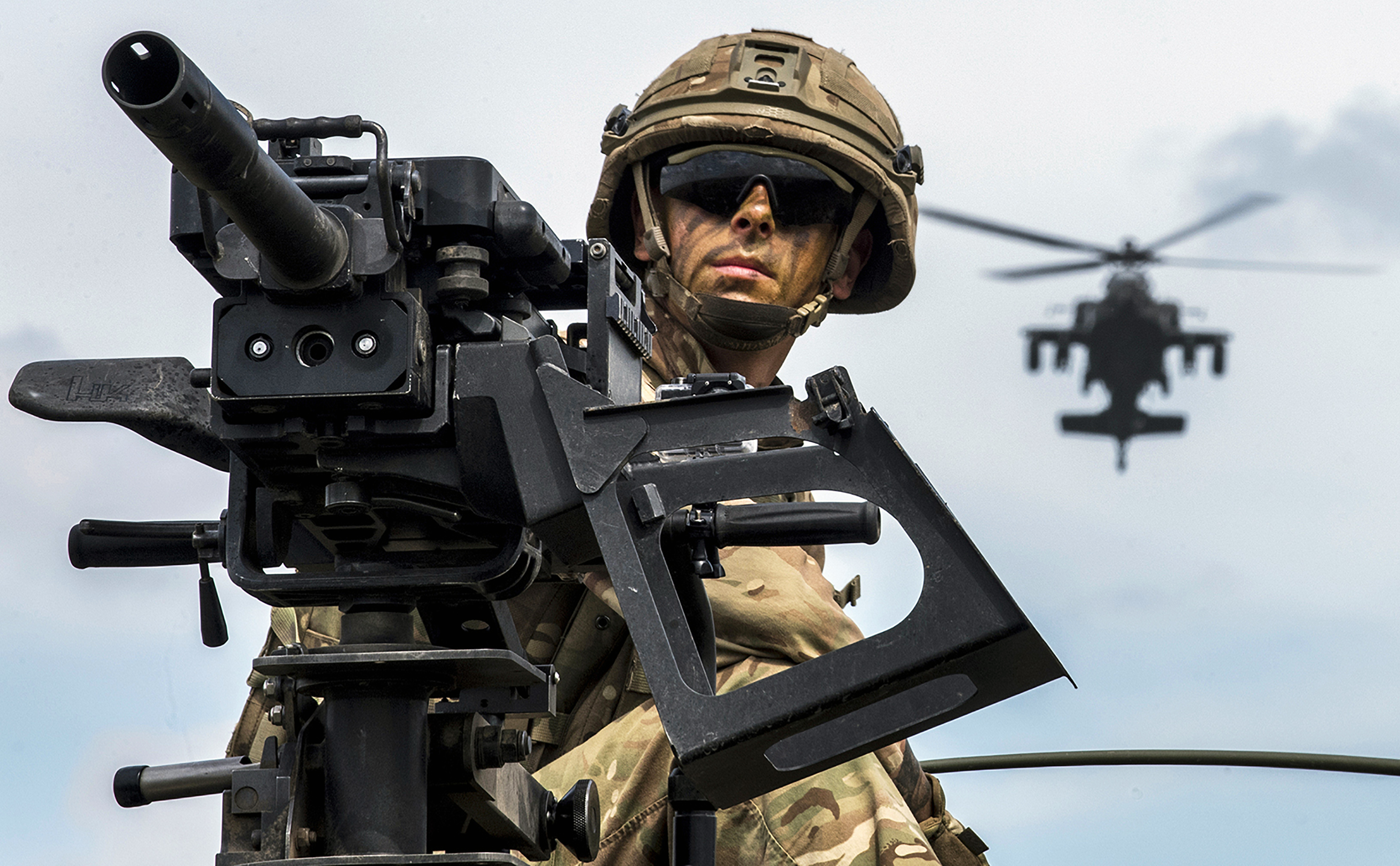
Soldier of The Welsh Cavalry with a 40mm Grenade Machine Gun in Poland as part of NATO's Enhanced Forward Presence.

The regiment is Light Cavalry. It was founded in 1685, and has been described as having a distinguished history of over 300 years. The 1st The Queen's Dragoon Guards is the Cavalry Regiment of Wales and the border counties, and is commonly known as The Welsh Cavalry; it is currently based in Robertson Barracks, Norfolk. The regiment specialises in reconnaissance and fights enemy forces for information about the enemy and the environment. The Welsh Cavalry uses Jackal 2 high mobility vehicles and also moves on foot, making the regiment very versatile and adaptable to various environments. Soldiers and officers in the cavalry also train foreign military personnel.

On 9 December 2021, it was announced that the Welsh Cavalry would move to a revamped Barracks in Caerwent, near Newport in Wales in 2028.

==== Deployments ====
- 1991 The Cavalry breaches the Iraqi defensive line in the Gulf War
- 2003-7 Three operational tours in Iraq
- 2008-14 Three operational tours in Afghanistan
- 2018-19 Two tours of Operation Cabrit in Poland

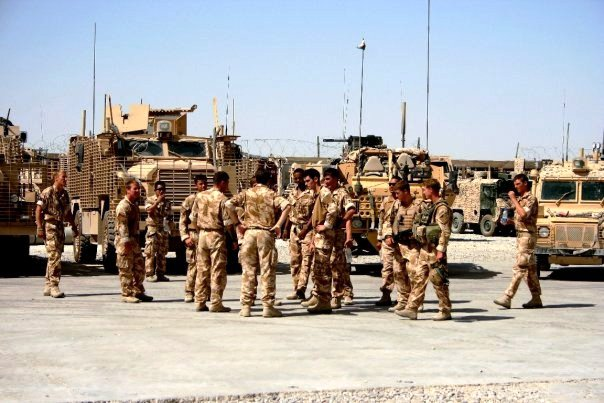
The Welsh Guards in Lashkar Gar, Helmand.

=== Welsh Guards ===
The Welsh Guards were formed in 1915 and have taken part in almost every British army campaign since World War I. The Welsh Guards are a Light Role Infantry, as a mobile and agile attack force. The Welsh Guards also have a ceremonial role in prominent English ceremonies and buildings. The Welsh Guards wear red tunics and bearskin hats. 91% of the Welsh guards are Welsh and permanently wear leeks as a Welsh symbol dating from use by soldiers of Welsh king Cadwaladr.

==== Deployments ====
- The 1st Battalion is deployed to the Falklands War also winning battle honours.
- The 1st Battalion plays a leading role in Operation Panchai Palang in Afghanistan.

== Royal Air Force in Wales ==
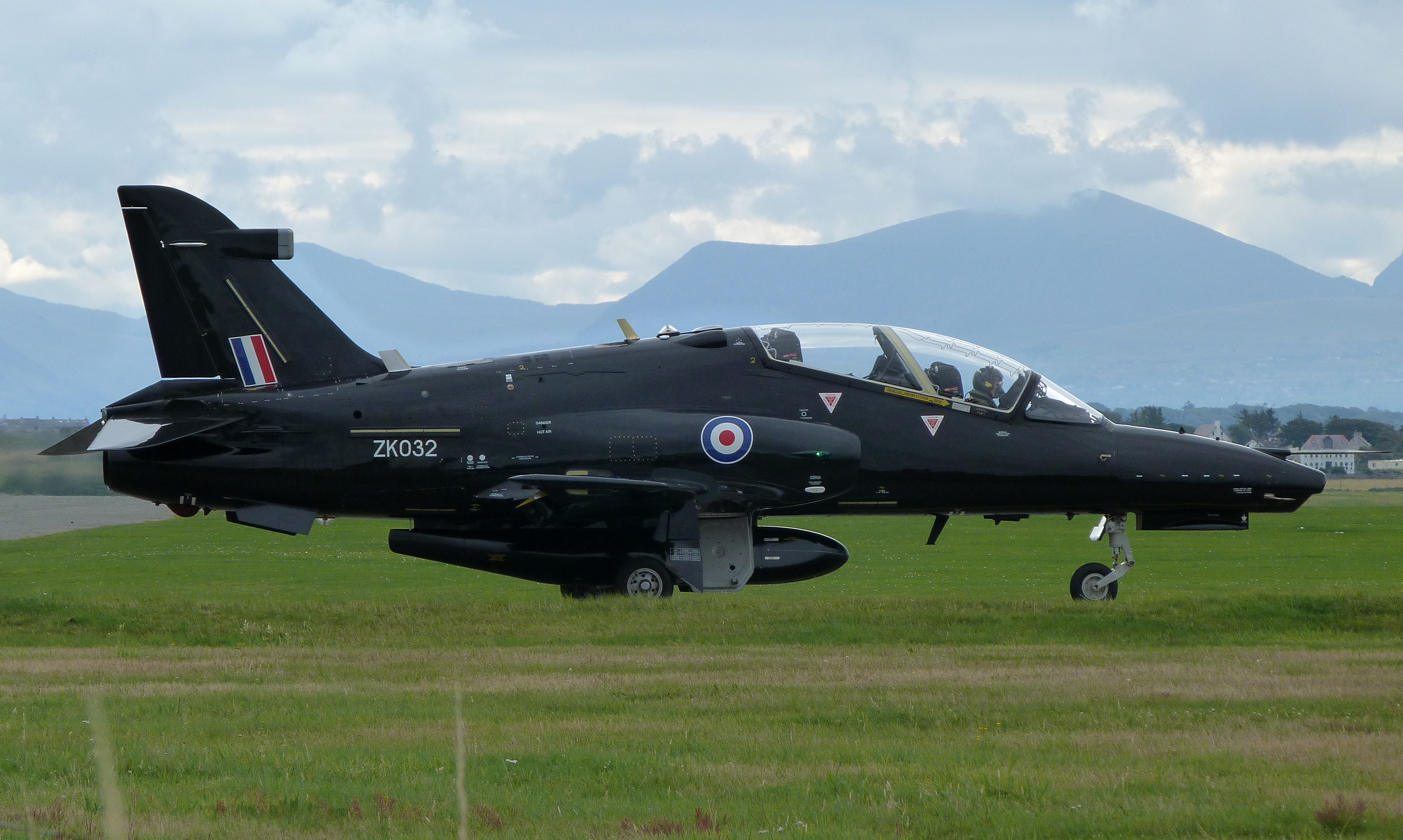
RAF Hawk T-2 ZK032 taxies for take-off at RAF Valley.

=== RAF Valley ===
Royal Air Force Valley, or more simply RAF Valley is a Royal Air Force station on the island of Anglesey, Wales, and which is also used as Anglesey Airport. It provides both Basic and Advanced fast-jet training using the Texan T1 and Hawk T2 and provides mountain and maritime training for aircrew using the Jupiter T1 helicopter.

=== MOD St Athan ===
MOD St Athan is a large Ministry of Defence site in the Vale of Glamorgan. The RAF's non-aircraft, ground engineering technicians are trained here.

MOD St Athan is the base for No 4 School of Technical Training, which provides training to personnel from the three branches of the armed forces as well as MOD civilian staff. St Athan is also the base of the University of Wales Air Squadron.

== Royal Navy in Wales ==
=== HMS Cambria ===
HMS Cambria is the lead Royal Naval Reserve unit in Wales. It is based at Sully near the Welsh capital, Cardiff.

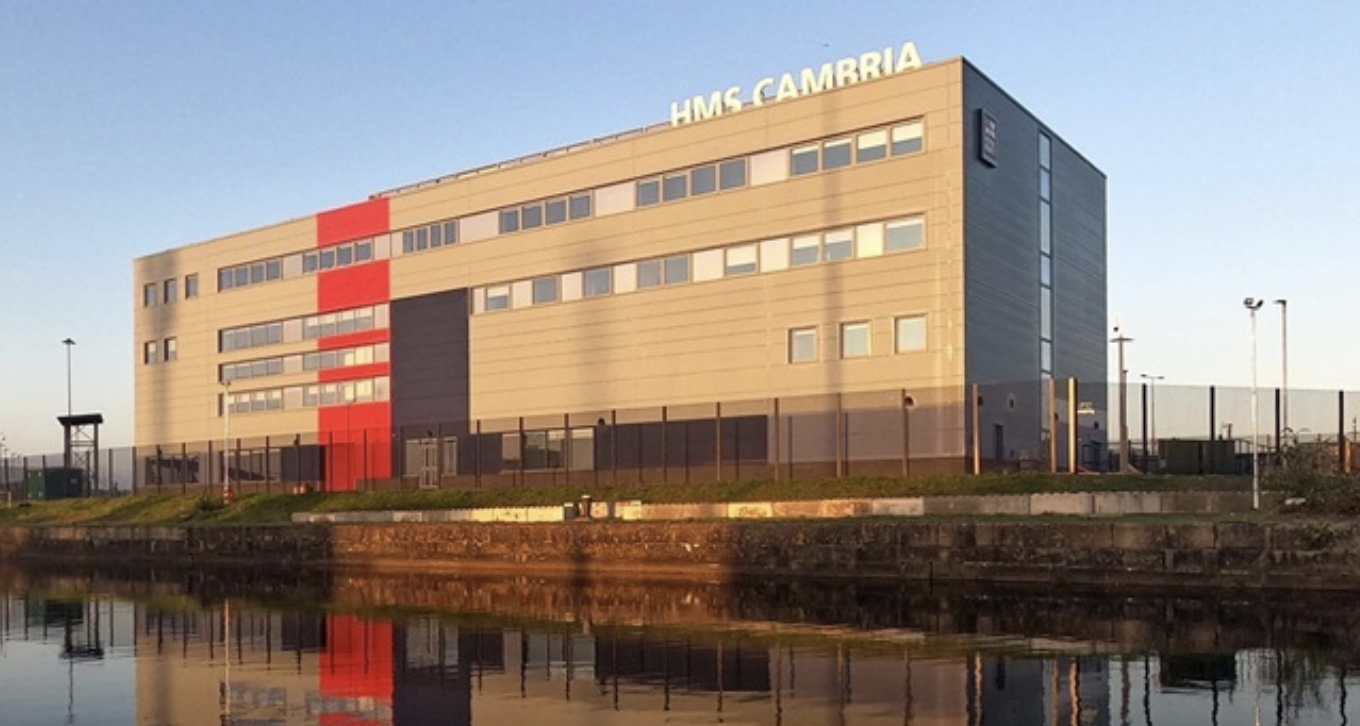
HMS Cambria base, Cardiff.

HMS Cambria was established as the Royal Naval Reserve unit for South Wales in July 1947 and originally occupied buildings in Cardiff Docks. Cambria remained in Cardiff until 1980, when the redevelopment of the docks there precipitated a move to the former service married couples' accommodation at Sully, Vale of Glamorgan. The unit was granted Freedom of the Vale in 2012, but was due to move to Cardiff Bay during 2020.

Over the years Cambria, like many other RNR units, operated a number of seagoing ships; a motor minesweeper – the unit's first tender – was replaced in 1954 by the wooden-hulled minesweeper Brereton, which gave way in turn to Crichton (1961–76); all of these were rechristened HMS St David. In 1978 the unit acquired a converted trawler, which was again renamed St David. The ship's final vessel, acquired in 1984, was the new minesweeper Waveney, which was not renamed. Waveney remained with HMS Cambria until 1994, when a reorganisation of the RNR led to the abandonment of seagoing tenders.

Cambria is one of only three RNR units to have a satellite unit. The Swansea-Tawe Division, based at Swansea, began its life as a Royal Naval Volunteer Reserve Wireless unit in 1932. Having originally begun life with just one recruit, the unit had expanded to 48 members by 1970. The unit was briefly commissioned as the stone frigate HMS Dragon from 1984 to 1994, but was subsequently made subordinate to Cambria and rechristened to its current name.

=== HMS Dragon ===
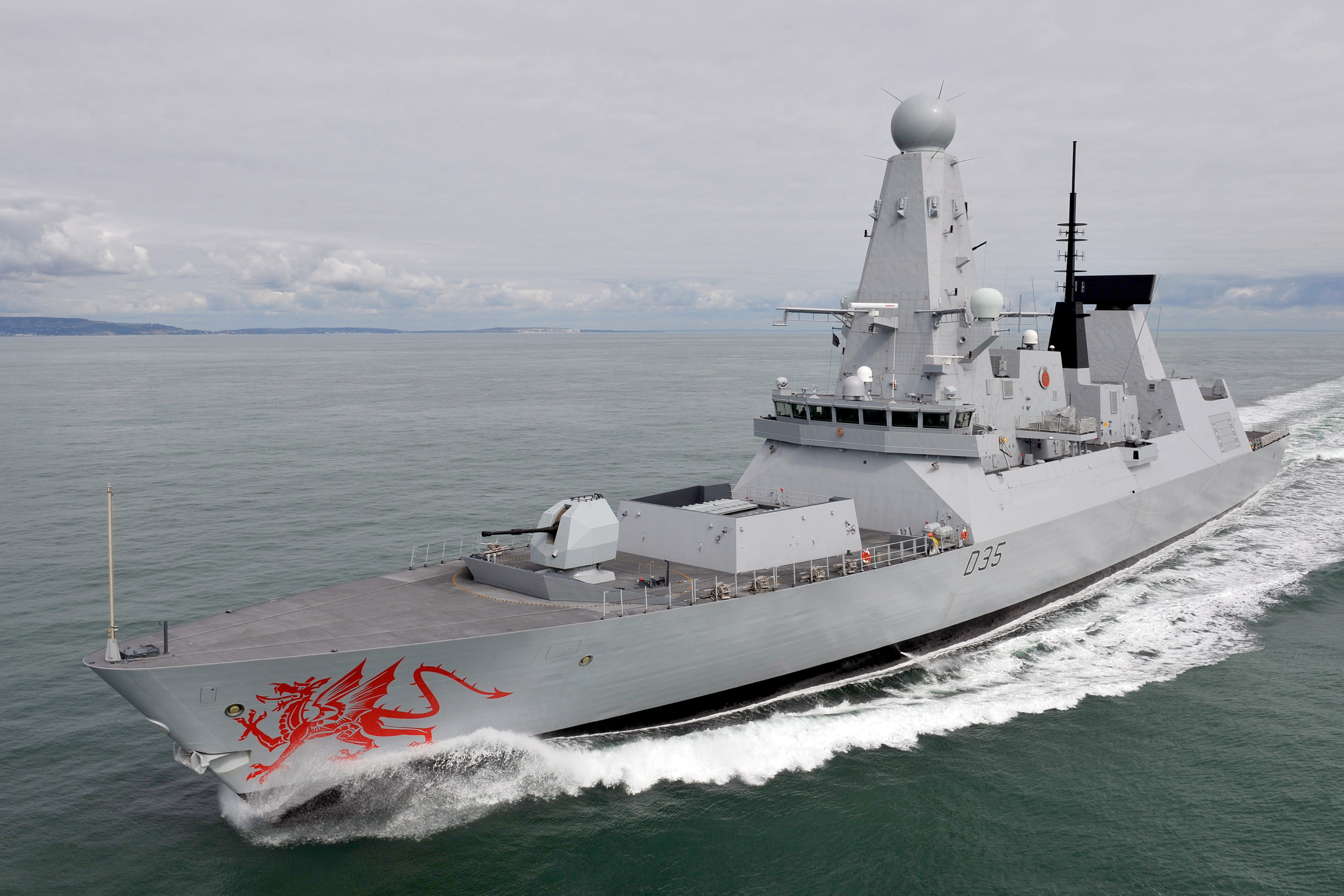
The Type 45 destroyer HMS Dragon in the English Channel with a red Welsh dragon on its bow.

HMS Dragon (D35) is the fourth ship of the Type 45 or Daring-class air-defence destroyers built for the Royal Navy. She was launched in November 2008 and commissioned on 20 April 2012. The warship is based in Portsmouth and also has affiliations with Cardiff, Wales. The original red dragons on the bows of the ship were privately funded and were removed during a refit and repaint. An appeal by the ship to its supporters in Cardiff and the British Warships Association (BWA), headquartered in Wales, received immediate response and support, and the Welsh dragons were reintroduced to the bows of the ship.

== Special forces training ==
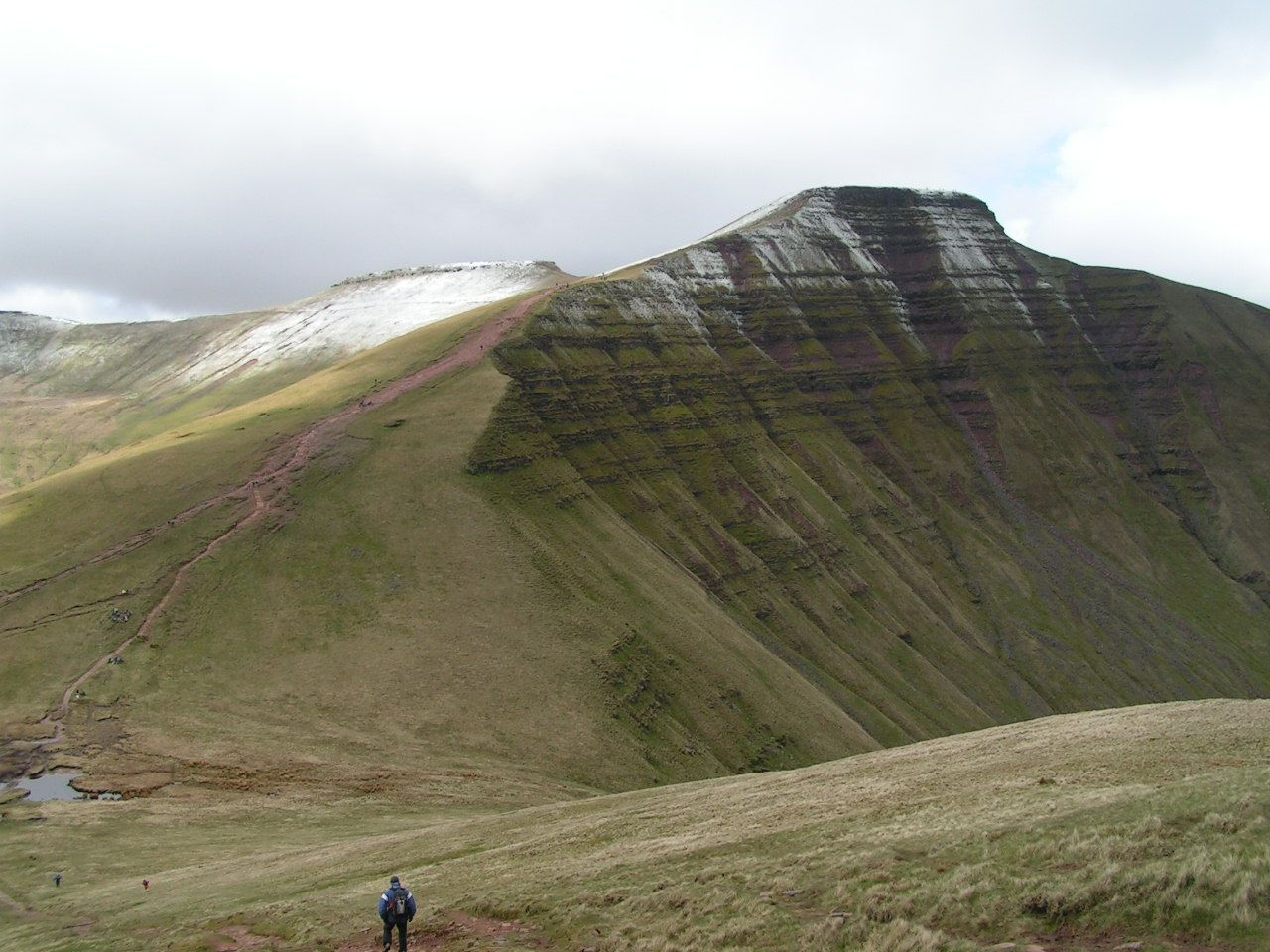
Pen y Fan from Cribyn.

=== Special Air Service selection ===
Selection for the Special Air Service (SAS) takes place in Wales, specifically Sennybridge and the Brecon Beacons, selection lasts for five weeks and normally starts with approximately 200 potential candidates.

Candidates complete a Personal Fitness Test (PFT) upon arrival, which includes a march cross-country against the clock, increasing the distance covered each day; this culminates in an endurance test known as the Endurance, in which candidates march 40 miles (64 km) with full equipment before climbing up and down the mountain Pen y Fan (886 m; 2,907 ft) in 20 hours.

== Bases ==
In 2018, Welsh government cabinet secretary for Local Government and Public Spending, Alun Davies stated his concerns about Ministry of Defence plans for potential army base closures in Wales, adding "The Welsh Identity within the Armed Forces is an essential part of our national identity. It is of central importance to the future of our Union that our Armed Forces are based in all constitute parts of the UK and that all our nations are able to play their part in defending the UK and all our nations are represented in the decisions over bases and the MoD’s wider estates strategy."

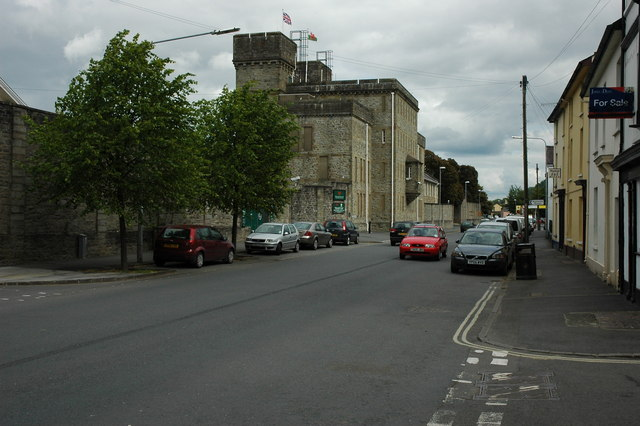
The Barracks, Brecon

In 2019 UK government was criticised for its planned closure of Cawdor Barracks, in Pembrokeshire to be closed in 2024 and Brecon in 2027. Welsh MPs on the Welsh Affairs committee at Westminster were concerned about the potentially negative impact on local communities in Wales. The Welsh Affairs Committee said in November 2019, "The UK Government should ensure that Wales has a fair share of military presence, broadly in proportion to its population. It should provide certainty about any proposed changes to the location of units and minimise the impact on the Welsh economy and local communities."

In November 2021, the UK government made a U turn saying that the Brecon Barracks will remain as the main Army headquarters in Wales. It was also announced that reserves base in Wrexham would be expanded as part of the UK government's £8.6bn Future Soldier programme. On the other hand, Cawdor Barracks in Pembrokeshire would still close, but this would be delayed until 2028. Head of the Army in Wales, Brigadier Andrew Dawes stated "We will welcome the Welsh Cavalry (Queen's Dragoon Guards) and an additional infantry unit to a new, purpose-built barracks in South Wales as well as a new sub-unit of 3 Royal Welsh in Wrexham." The UK government stated that Welsh infantry soldiers "will remain at the heart of the Army's war-fighting capability with the 1st Battalion, The Royal Welsh receiving the Army's new Armoured Personnel Carrier, Boxer".

UK Defence Secretary Ben Wallace announced in December 2021 that The Welsh Cavalry (The Queen's Dragoon Guards) who predominantly recruit from Wales, will be moving to a renovated Caerwent Barracks from 2028.

The First Minister of Wales, Mark Drakeford told the Senedd in October 2021 that Wales contributes almost twice its population proportion of armed services personnel “yet we have half our population share in terms of the basing strategy of the armed forces.” Drakeford said that whilst Wales has 5% of the UK's population, the country provides 9% of the UK's service personnel and that only 2.5% of Welsh personnel are based in Wales.

== Veterans ==
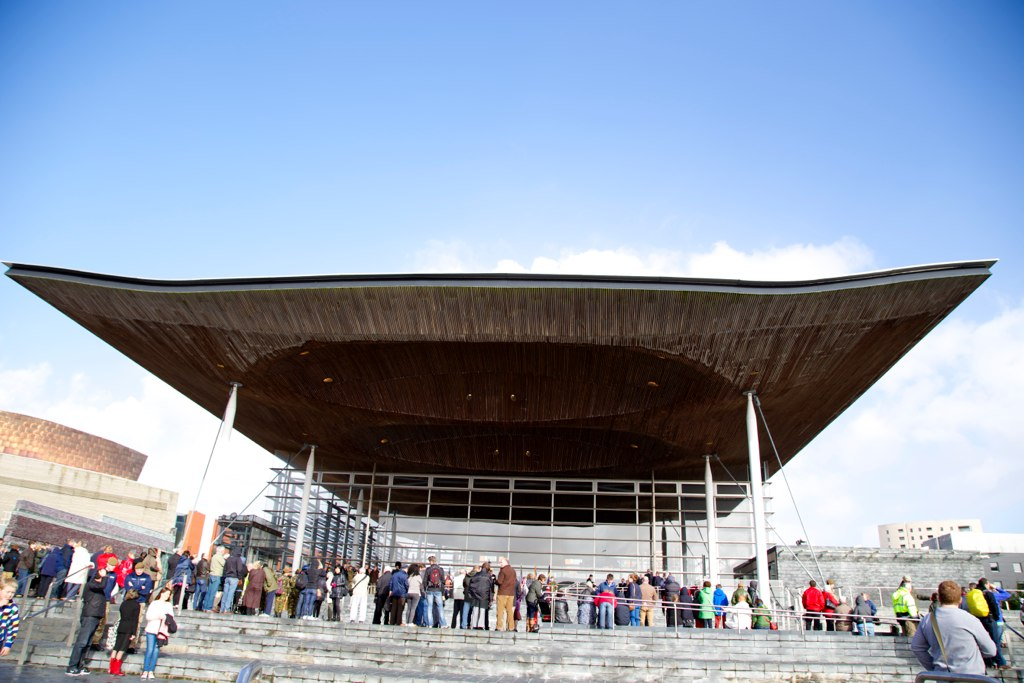
Walk on Wales £1million charity walk in aid of Welsh soldiers at the Senedd building

In the 2021 census, around 115,000 people in Wales reported that they had previously served in the armed forces, around 4.5% of usual residents in Wales aged 16 years or older. This is a higher number of veterans than there are in England (3.8%). Of the veterans of Wales, 76.3% (88,000 people) have served in the regular forces, 19.3% (22,000 people) have served in the reserve forces, and 4.5% (5,000 people) served in both. Of Welsh households, 8.1% had one or more persons who had served in the military. This is also higher than in England at 7.0%.

Colonel James Phillips is the first Veterans’ Commissioner for Wales, who works to enhance support for veterans in Wales and scrutinise government policy for veterans as well as providing advice to government.

The Welsh Veterans Award are annual awards which are held in association with ABF Soldiers’ Charity to recognise the achievements of Welsh Reservists, companies and employers that support the Armed Forces community in Wales.

== Welsh government policies ==
The armed forces personnel and veterans in Wales have free access to participating leisure centres and pools, using their defence privilege card.

All 22 Welsh local authorities have signed the Armed Forces Covenant and each authority has appointed an Armed Forces Champion. The Welsh Local Government Association (WLGA) oversees the Covenant in local authority areas and manages organisations such as SSCE Cymru which supports the children of military personnel in education. The Welsh Government funds Veterans NHS Wales and Veterans Trauma Network Wales and runs A Great Place to Work for Veterans scheme to support veterans in acquiring civil service employment. The Welsh government also supports the seven regional Armed Forces Liaison Officers (AFLOs) and runs an advice service called Wales Resettlement Guide. The Welsh Government receives advice from the Expert Group on the Needs of the Armed Forces Community in Wales and produces an annual report on implementing the covenant in Wales.

== Cadets ==
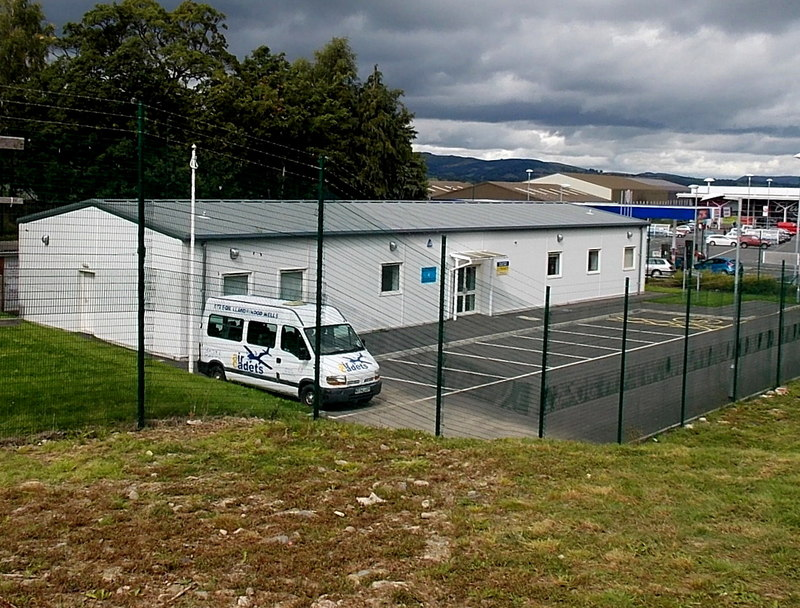
Cadet centre, Llandrindod Wells

There are around 5,000 cadets in Wales who develop skills and qualifications by working in communities and charities and participating in practical activities as organised by 1,500 volunteers. The Reserve Forces’ and Cadets’ Association for Wales is an organisation that has supported the Armed Forces for over a century.
