= University Service Units =

The University Service Units is the collective term used by the Ministry of Defence for the University Royal Naval Unit, the University Officers' Training Corps and the University Air Squadron. They are reserves of the British Armed Forces, however they have "no call out liability".

== See also ==
- Volunteer Reserves
- Regular Reserve
- Sponsored Reserves
- Reserve Officers' Training Corps, the United States equivalent
