= Defence Act =

Stock short title used for legislation

Defence Act is a stock short title used in Australia, Ireland, New Zealand and the United Kingdom for legislation relating to territorial defence.

== List ==
=== Australia ===
- The Defence Act 1903
- The Defence (Citizen Military Forces) Act 1943

=== Ireland ===
- The Defence (Amendment) Act 2011
- The Defence (Miscellaneous Provisions) Act 2009
- The Defence (Amendment) Act 2007
- The Defence (Amendment) Act 2006
- The Defence (Amendment) Act, 1998
- The Defence (Amendment) Act, 1993
- The Defence (Amendment) Act, 1990
- The Defence (Amendment) Act, 1987
- The Defence (Amendment) Act, 1979
- The Defence (Amendment) (No. 2) Act, 1979
- The Defence (Amendment) Act, 1960
- The Defence (Amendment) (No. 2) Act, 1960
- The Defence Act, 1954
- The Civil Defence Act 2012
- The Civil Defence Act, 2002
- The Ombudsman (Defence Forces) Act 2004
- The Defence Forces (Pensions) (Amendment) Act, 1975
- The Defence Forces (Pensions) (Amendment) Act, 1968
- The Defence Forces (Pensions) (Amendment) Act, 1957
- The Defence Forces (Temporary Provisions) Act, 1954
- The Defence Forces (Temporary Provisions) Act, 1953
- The Defence Forces (Temporary Provisions) Act, 1952
- The Defence Forces (Temporary Provisions) Act, 1951
- The Defence Forces (Temporary Provisions) Act, 1950
- The Defence Forces (Temporary Provisions) Act, 1949
- The Defence Forces (Pensions) (Amendment) Act, 1949
- The Defence Forces (Temporary Provisions) Act, 1948
- The Defence Forces (Temporary Provisions) Act, 1947
- The Defence Forces (Temporary Provisions) Act, 1946
- The Defence Forces (Temporary Provisions) Act, 1945
- The Defence Forces (Temporary Provisions) Act, 1944
- The Defence Forces (Temporary Provisions) Act, 1943
- The Defence Forces (Temporary Provisions) Act, 1942
- The Defence Forces (Temporary Provisions) Act, 1941
- The Defence Forces (Temporary Provisions) Act, 1940
- The Defence Forces (Temporary Provisions) (No. 2) Act, 1940
- The Defence Forces (Temporary Provisions) Act, 1939
- The Defence Forces (Temporary Provisions) Act, 1938
- The Defence Forces (Pensions) (Amendment) Act, 1938
- The Defence Forces (Temporary Provisions) Act, 1937
- The Defence Forces Act, 1937
- The Defence Forces (Temporary Provisions) Act, 1936
- The Defence Forces (Temporary Provisions) Act, 1935
- The Defence Forces (Temporary Provisions) Act, 1934
- The Defence Forces (Temporary Provisions) (No. 2) Act, 1934
- The Defence Forces (Temporary Provisions) Act, 1933
- The Defence Forces (Pensions) Act, 1932
- The Defence Forces (Temporary Provisions) Act, 1931
- The Defence Forces (Temporary Provisions) (No. 2) Act, 1931
- The Defence Forces (Temporary Provisions) Act, 1930
- The Defence Forces (Temporary Provisions) Act, 1929
- The Defence Forces (Temporary Provisions) Act, 1927
- The Defence Forces (Temporary Provisions) (No. 2) Act, 1927
- The Defence Forces (Temporary Provisions) Act, 1926
- The Defence Forces (Temporary Provisions) Act, 1925
- The Defence Forces (Temporary Provisions) Act, 1923 (Continuance and Amendment) Act, 1924
- The Defence Forces (Temporary Provisions) Act, 1923

=== New Zealand ===
- The Defence Act 1886 (No 17)
- Defence Act 1909
- Defence Act 1964
- Defence Act 1971
- Defence Act 1990

=== United Kingdom ===
- The Defence (Transfer of Functions) Act 1964 (c. 15)

The Defence Acts 1842 to 1873 is the collective title of the following Acts:

- The Defence Act 1842 (5 & 6 Vict. c. 94)
- The Defence Act 1854 (17 & 18 Vict. c. 67)
- The Defence Act 1859 (22 Vict. c. 12)
- The Defence Act 1860 (23 & 24 Vict. c. 112)
- The Defence Act 1865 (28 & 29 Vict. c. 65)
- The Defence Acts Amendment Act 1873 (36 & 37 Vict. c. 72)

== See also ==
- Armed Forces Act
- List of short titles
