= Reserve Forces Act 1996 =

Act of the Parliament of the United Kingdom

Reserve Forces Act 1996 (Note: Section 132(1).)
- Act of Parliament
- Parliament of the United Kingdom
- Long title: An Act to make provision with respect to the reserve forces of the Crown and persons liable to be recalled for permanent service; to amend the provisions of the Reserve Forces Act 1980 relating to the lieutenancies; to amend the law relating to the postponement of the discharge or transfer to the reserve of regular servicemen; and for connected purposes.
- Citation: 1996 c. 14
- Territorial extent: England and Wales; Scotland; Northern Ireland (Note: Section 132(2).); Isle of Man, subject to exceptions and modifications.; Certain provisions in sections 51, 52 and 110, and in Part VII, are extended to the Channel Islands by sections 51(4), 52(9), 77(1) and 110(4).

Dates
- Royal assent: 22 May 1996
- Commencement: Various (Note: Section 132(3).)
Other legislation
Amends	House of Commons Disqualification Act 1975; Reserve Forces Act 1980; Magistrates' Courts Act 1980; Reserve Forces (Safeguard of Employment) Act 1985; Wages Act 1986
Repeals/revokes	Home Guard Act 1951; Reserve Forces Act 1982
Amended by	Employment Tribunals Act 1996; Employment Rights Act 1996; Lieutenancies Act 1997; Armed Forces Discipline Act 2000; Armed Forces Act 2006; Charities Act 2011; Defence Reform Act 2014; Armed Forces Act 2021

Status: Amended

Text of statute as originally enacted

Text of the Reserve Forces Act 1996 as in force today (including any amendments) within the United Kingdom, from legislation.gov.uk.

The Reserve Forces Act 1996 (c. 14) is an act of the Parliament of the United Kingdom that provides for the maintenance and composition of the reserve forces of the Crown.

== Composition of the reserve ==
The Reserve Forces comprise:

- The Reserve Naval and Marine Forces - the Royal Fleet Reserve, the Royal Naval Reserve, and the Royal Marines Reserve.
- The Reserve Land Forces - the Army Reserve (Regular) and the Territorial Army (now known as the Army Reserve).
- The Reserve Air Forces - the Air Force Reserve and the Royal Auxiliary Air Force.

The Royal Fleet Reserve, the Army Reserve, and the Air Force Reserve are the Regular Reserve forces, comprising men and women who previously served in the regular forces and are liable for recall to active duty as reservists.

The Royal Naval Reserve, the Territorial Army, and the Royal Auxiliary Air Force are the Volunteer Reserve forces, comprising men and women who are members of the volunteer forces and liable to be called for active duty.

In addition, the act allows for the use of Sponsored Reserves whose employer enters into a contract with the Ministry of Defence to provide personnel to carry out specialist tasks as part of the armed forces. Examples are the Mobile Meteorological Unit, some of the staff on Royal Air Force transport aircraft (non flight crew) and some fleet container transport ships.
