= Exercise Cambrian Patrol =

Annual military exercise in Wales

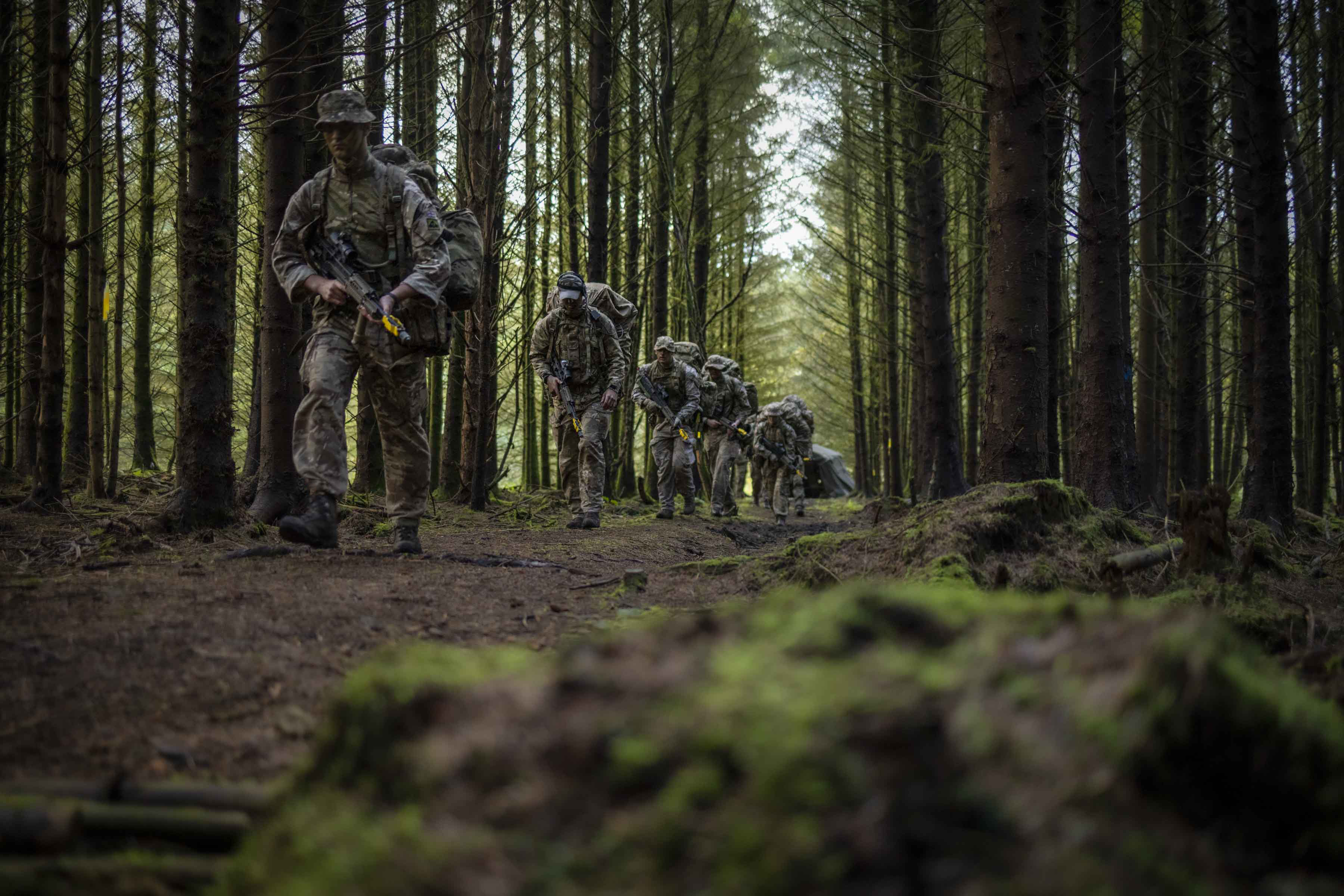
Soldiers from the 12th Armoured Brigade Combat Team taking part in 2022's Cambrian Patrol event.

Exercise Cambrian Patrol is an annual international military exercise, organised by the British Army, that involves the participating units covering a 40-mile (65 km) course in less than 48 hours while performing numerous types of military maneuvers and patrols placed throughout the rugged Cambrian Mountains and swamplands of mid-Wales.

Cambrian Patrol was first set up in August 1959 by Welsh, British Army, Major General Lewis Pugh DSO, to feature long distance marching over the Cambrian Mountains from Tonfanau on the west coast of Wales. Since then, the exercise has been rigorously updated to meet the challenges faced by modern soldiers.

The event is open to units from all three services, the British Army, Royal Navy and Royal Air Force, both Regular and Reserve (Inc. UOTC), as well as international armed forces who also take part from countries including the United States, Pakistan, Mexico, Ireland, New Zealand, Australia, Spain and France as well as others.

The competition consists of teams of eight men or women patrolling across difficult terrain. It's a test of leadership, self-discipline, courage, physical endurance and determination. The exercise usually starts with teams arriving at a rendezvous before having their equipment checked to make sure they have everything required. Missing equipment will be replaced by dead weight and will mean points will be deducted. From there the team leader will be taken to orders while the rest of the team set up a quick hide, start their battle prep and prepare to receive orders i.e. prepare a model of the ground which will be covered during the patrol. Many of the teams that enter do not finish, those that do earn one of four distinctions; gold medal, silver medal, bronze medal, or passing.

== Cadet Forces Cambrian Patrol ==
The MOD sponsored youth organisation, the Army Cadet Force, runs a 'Cadet Cambrian Patrol' for under 18s, which aims to test Cadets on the Army Cadet Syllabus over 2 days and seeks to emulate elements of Ex Cambrian Patrol (as far that is practical, appropriate and safe for ACF and CCF cadets). The distance covered is much less than the Ex Cambrian Patrol, at approx 25 km. Combined Cadet Force units also take part.
