= Armed Forces Discipline Act 2000 =

Act of the Parliament of the United Kingdom

Armed Forces Discipline Act 2000 (Note: Section 28(1).)
- Act of Parliament
- Parliament of the United Kingdom
- Long title: An Act to amend the Army Act 1955, the Air Force Act 1955 and the Naval Discipline Act 1957 in relation to custody, the right to elect court-martial trial and appeals against findings made or punishments awarded on summary dealing or summary trial; and for connected purposes.
- Citation: 2000 c. 4
- Territorial extent: United Kingdom

Dates
- Royal assent: 25 May 2000
- Commencement: 2 October 2000 (Note: Section 28(2)–(3). The Armed Forces Discipline Act 2000 (Commencement and Transitional Provisions) Order 2000 (SI 2000/2366).)
- Repealed: 31 October 2009 (Note: The Armed Forces Act 2006 (Commencement No. 5) Order 2009 (SI 2009/1167.)
Other legislation
Amends	Army Act 1955; Air Force Act 1955; Naval Discipline Act 1957; Reserve Forces Act 1996
Repealed by	Armed Forces Act 2006

Status: Repealed

Text of statute as originally enacted

Revised text of statute as amended

The Armed Forces Discipline Act 2000 (c. 4) was an act of the Parliament of the United Kingdom.

== Provisions ==
It amends the Army Act 1955 (3 & 4 Eliz. 2. c. 18), the Air Force Act 1955 (3 & 4 Eliz. 2). c. 10) and the Naval Discipline Act 1957 (5 & 6 Eliz. 2. c. 53) in relation to custody, the right to elect court-martial trial and appeals against findings made or punishments awarded on summary dealing or summary trial; and for connected purposes.

The act incorporates human rights legislation into military law. The act gave personnel a right to complain to an independent summary appeals court. The act brought decisions concerning detention pending charge and trial under the scope of judicial review.

== Subsequent developments ==
The whole act was repealed by section 378(2) of, and schedule 17 to, the Armed Forces Act 2006, which came into force on 31 October 2009.

== See also ==
- Armed Forces Act
