= Lieutenancies Act 1997 =

Act of the Parliament of the United Kingdom

Lieutenancies Act 1997 (Note: Section 9(1).)
- Act of Parliament
- Parliament of the United Kingdom
- Long title: An Act to consolidate certain enactments relating to the lieutenancies in Great Britain.
- Citation: 1997 c. 23
- Introduced by: Lord Mackay of Clashfern, Lord Chancellor (Lords)
- Territorial extent: England and Wales; Scotland; (Note: Section 9(4).)

Dates
- Royal assent: 19 March 1997
- Commencement: 1 July 1997 (Note: Section 9(2).)
Other legislation
Amends	Reserve Forces Act 1996; See § Repealed enactments
Amended by	Local Government Changes for England (Lord-Lieutenants and Sheriffs) Order 1997; Local Government (Structural Changes) (Miscellaneous Amendments and Other Provision) Order 2009; Lord President of the Council Order 2010; Local Government (Structural and Boundary Changes) (Supplementary Provision and Miscellaneous Amendments) Order 2019; Northamptonshire (Structural Changes) (Supplementary Provision and Amendment) Order 2021; Cumbria (Structural Changes) Order 2022

Status: Amended

Text of statute as originally enacted

Revised text of statute as amended

The Lieutenancies Act 1997 (c. 23) is an act of the Parliament of the United Kingdom that defines areas that lord-lieutenants are appointed to in Great Britain. It came into force on 1 July 1997.

== Creation of modern local government ==
Prior to the Local Government Act 1888 (51 & 52 Vict. c. 41), a Lord-Lieutenant was appointed to each of the counties. However this act redefined the areas to be combinations of the new administrative counties and county boroughs. In practice the effect was quite minor, with only a few border differences between the historic and new administrative counties.

These areas changed little until the 1965 creation of Greater London and Huntingdon and Peterborough, which resulted in the abolition of the offices of Lord Lieutenant of Middlesex, Lord Lieutenant of the County of London and Lord Lieutenant of Huntingdonshire and the creation of the Lord Lieutenant of Greater London and Lord Lieutenant of Huntingdon and Peterborough.

== Local government re-organisation ==
=== England ===
In 1974 county boroughs and several administrative counties were rearranged in England and Wales. Lieutenancies were also redefined to use the new metropolitan and non-metropolitan counties directly.

Some of these Lieutenancies did not last long, however. By the mid-1990s, another local government reorganisation was underway and many of the non-metropolitan counties in England were re-organised, resulting in the creation of unitary authorities. Most such unitary authorities created from the mid 1990s onwards are legally a non-metropolitan district and a non-metropolitan county which cover the same area and have just one council. It was decided in 1995 that some of these new non-metropolitan counties should not have their own lieutenant, and so provision was made for defining the counties for the purposes of shrievalty and lieutenancy differently from the local government counties with effect from 1 April 1996. In particular, for the abolished counties of Avon, Cleveland and Humberside the lieutenancy areas were re-aligned to generally correspond to the pre-1974 counties (with the exception of Bristol which became its own lieutenancy area). When Herefordshire, Rutland and Worcestershire were re-established as local government counties in 1997 and 1998, no amendment was made to the 1997 Act regarding them, allowing them to also serve as their own lieutenancy areas. This both redefined the lieutenancy area of Leicestershire to what it had been prior to 1974 and fully abolished the lieutenancy area of the now defunct Hereford and Worcester county.

These provisions for defining counties for the purposes of lieutenancy differently from local government counties were consolidated into the Lieutenancies Act 1997. Various amendments to the 1997 Act have been made since 1997 to update these ceremonial counties to be defined in terms of new unitary authorities.

=== Scotland ===
The Local Government (Scotland) Act 1973 redefined the Lieutenancies not to be based on the then new Scottish Regions but as an approximation of the traditional counties in some places and entirely new creations in others.

Local government in Scotland was further reformed on 1 April 1996 into single-tier authorities designated as "Councils", but the lieutenancies remain mostly matching the pre-1973 counties and cities.

=== Wales ===
Local government in Wales was reorganised into a single-tier system on 1 Apr 1996 with the authorities designated as "Principal Councils" but nominally described as Cities, Boroughs or Counties. The lieutenancy areas remain based on the system of local government existing from 1974 to 1996.

== Passage ==
The Lieutenancies Bill was introduced in the House of Lords by the Lord Chancellor in January 1997, as a consolidation bill, to simplify and replace earlier legislation. It had its second reading soon afterwards. As a consolidation bill it was not subject to debate in the Commons at the second and third readings.

== Lieutenancy areas ==
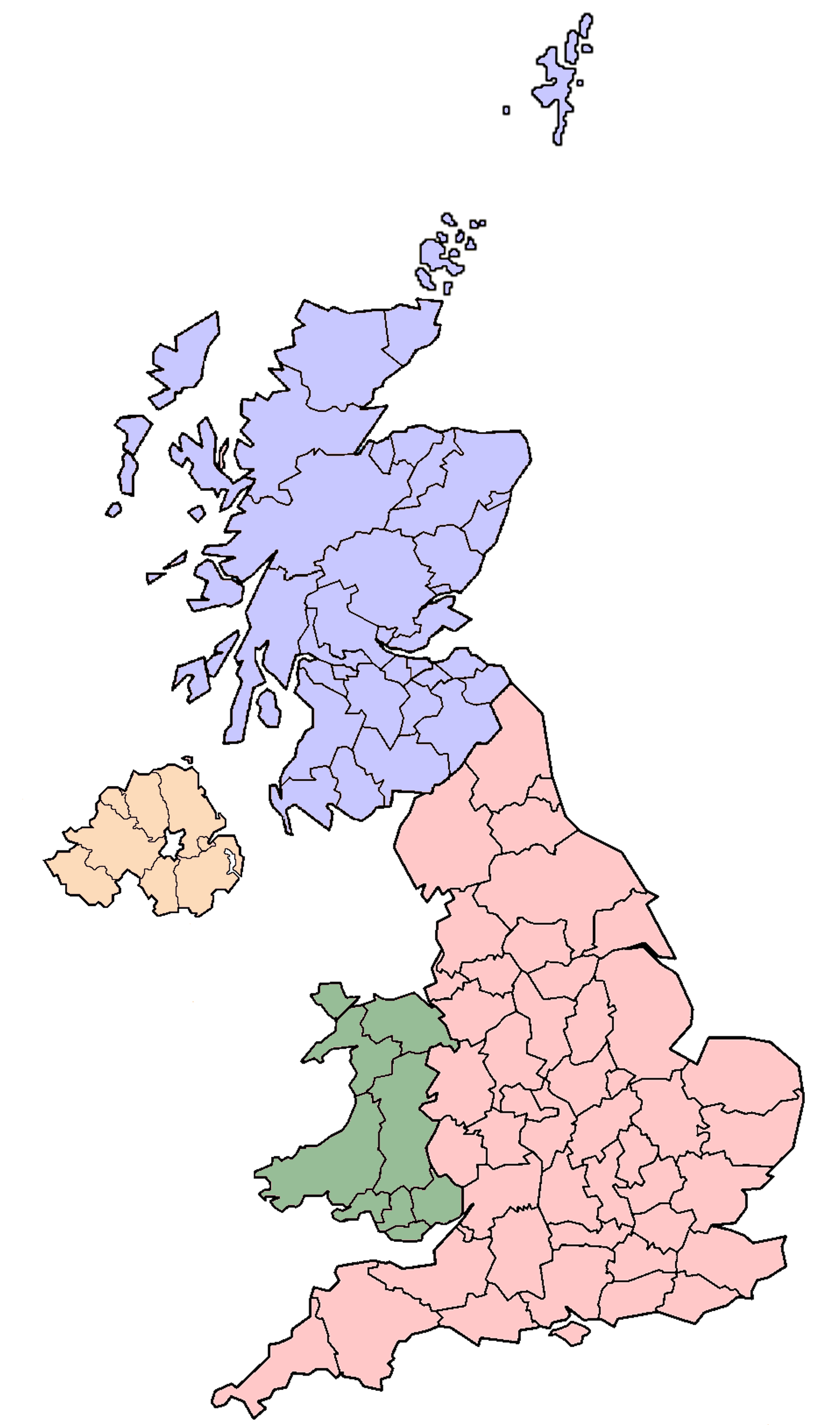
The current Lieutenancy areas as of 2017

- In England the lieutenancy areas are defined in terms of local government areas created by the Local Government Act 1972 as amended.
- In Scotland the lieutenancy areas as defined by statutory instrument. The current such one being the Lord-Lieutenants (Scotland) Order 1996, Statutory Instrument 1996 No. 731 (S.83)
- In Wales the lieutenancy areas are defined as the "preserved counties" — currently defined as combinations of local government areas by the Preserved Counties (Amendment to Boundaries) (Wales) Order 2003, Statutory Instrument 2003 No. 974 (W.133).

== Provisions ==
The act provides for the appointment of lord-lieutenants for each county in England, each county in Wales, and each area in Scotland (with the Lord Provost of Aberdeen, Dundee, Edinburgh and Glasgow serving as lord-lieutenant for their respective cities by virtue of office). It also makes provision for the appointment of deputy lieutenants and vice lord-lieutenants, the appointment of clerks of the lieutenancy, and the functions of the Commissioners of Lieutenancy for the City of London.

=== Repealed enactments ===
Section 8(4) of the act repealed 5 enactments, listed in schedule 3 to the act.

Citation	Short title	Extent of repeal
1964 c. 42	Administration of Justice Act 1964	In section 26, the word "lieutenants".
1980 c. 9	Reserve Forces Act 1980	Sections 130 to 137.
1980 c. 9	Reserve Forces Act 1980	In section 138, subsection (1), in subsection (2), the words "the lieutenancies and" and from "and so" to the end, and subsections (3) to (5).
1980 c. 9	Reserve Forces Act 1980	In section 156(1), the definition of "area".
1980 c. 9	Reserve Forces Act 1980	In Schedule 8, paragraphs 13 and 14.
1994 c. 19	Local Government (Wales) Act 1994	Section 61(1) and (5).
1994 c. 39	Local Government etc. (Scotland) Act 1994	In Schedule 13, paragraph 116.
1996 c. 14	Reserve Forces Act 1996	Section 121.
1996 c. 14	Reserve Forces Act 1996	Schedule 6.

== See also ==
- Ceremonial counties of England
- Lieutenancy areas of Scotland
- Preserved counties of Wales
- Lieutenancy areas of Northern Ireland
