= Defence Reform Act 2014 =

Act of the Parliament of the United Kingdom

Defence Reform Act 2014 (Note: Section 51.)
- Act of Parliament
- Parliament of the United Kingdom
- Long title: An Act to make provision in connection with any arrangements that may be made by the Secretary of State with respect to the provision to the Secretary of State of defence procurement services; to make provision relating to defence procurement contracts awarded, or amended, otherwise than as the result of a competitive process; to make provision in relation to the reserve forces of the Crown; and for connected purposes.
- Citation: 2014 c. 20
- Introduced by: Philip Dunne
- Territorial extent: United Kingdom (Note: Section 49.)

Dates
- Royal assent: 14 May 2014
- Commencement: Various (Note: Section 50.)
Other legislation
Amends	House of Commons Disqualification Act 1975; Reserve Forces Act 1980; Reserve Forces Act 1996
Amended by	Sentencing Act 2020; Procurement Act 2023
Relates to	Armed Forces Act 2006

Status: Amended

Text of statute as originally enacted

Revised text of statute as amended

The Defence Reform Act 2014 (c. 20) is an act of the Parliament of the United Kingdom concerned with defence procurement and the UK Reserve Forces, particularly the Territorial Army. It has 51 sections and seven schedules.

== Provisions ==
Part 1 of the act relates to defence procurement in general. Part 2 created a statutory framework for single-source contracts, operating in accordance with the Single Source Contract Regulations. The Single Source Regulations Office (SSRO) was established under the Act. The act allowed for the streamlining of the Defence Equipment and Support Agency (DE&S).

Part 3 is concerned with reserve forces: the Army Reserve was renamed the Regular Reserve and the Territorial Army was renamed the Army Reserve. The act increased the size of the reserved forces.

The act increased provided for 3,000 additional regular soldiers.

== Parliamentary history ==
=== First reading ===
The act had its first reading in the House of Commons on 3 July 2013. Its backers were the Prime Minister, the Deputy Prime Minister, Treasury Chief Secretary Danny Alexander, Business Secretary Vince Cable, Justice Secretary Chris Grayling, Cabinet Office Minister Francis Maude, Dominic Grieve and the Bill Minister, Minister for Defence Equipment and Support, Philip Dunne.

=== Second reading ===
The second reading in the House of Commons took place on 16 July 2013.

=== Subsequent stages ===
Subsequent parliamentary stages were as follows:

House	Stage	Date(s)
Commons	Committee	3 September 2013 - 22 October 2013
Commons	Report	20 November 2013
Commons	3rd Reading	20 November 2013
Lords	1st Reading	21 November 2013
Lords	2nd Reading	10 December 2013
Lords	Committee	3 February 2014 - 25 February 2014
Lords	Report	24 March 2014 - 26 March 2014
Lords	3rd Reading	2 Apr 2014

The bill returned to the House of Commons on 29 April 2014, where a programme motion was passed, and Commons Consideration of Lords' Amendments took place.

=== Royal assent ===
The bill was given royal assent (and thus became an act) on 14 May 2014.
