= Single Source Regulations Office =

Non-departmental public body overview
- Formed: July 14, 2014
- Preceding Non-departmental public body: Review Board for Government Contracts
- Jurisdiction: United Kingdom
- Headquarters: 100 Parliament Street, London, SW1A 2BQ
- Employees: 39
- Minister responsible: Maria Eagle MP, Minister of State for Defence Procurement and Industry
- Non-departmental public body executives: Hannah Nixon, Chair; John Russell, Chief Executive
- Parent department: Ministry of Defence (United Kingdom)
- Website: gov.uk/government/organisations/single-source-regulations-office

The Single Source Regulations Office (SSRO) is a non-departmental public body in the United Kingdom responsible for overseeing and monitoring the Single Source Procurement Framework established by Part 2 of the Defence Reform Act 2014. Its role is to monitor the level of profit that the Ministry of Defence pays out to its contractors when contracts are not tendered competitively.

The chair of the office is Hannah Nixon and its chief executive is John Russell. The chief executive acts as accounting officer to Parliament.

== History ==
The SSRO was established under the Defence Reform Act 2014 and is sponsored by the Ministry of Defence. It operates independently of the MoD but the MoD's sponsorship role means that the ministry must provide "general oversight" and report to HM Treasury on the SSRO's activities. To this end a "framework document" was adopted in 2014 outlining the working relationship between the two bodies.

The regulatory framework for single source defence contracts came fully into force in December 2014, after Parliamentary approval was confirmed for the Single Source Contract Regulations 2014.

In March 2015, the Secretary of State for Defence accepted the SSRO's recommendation for a 10.6% baseline profit rate for the coming year (2015/2016). This was slightly lower than the previous year.

In September 2015, the SSRO announced it wanted to change the way the level of profit is calculated. The two main changes were that there should be different rates for different types of work and that more comparison should be made with international defence contractors and less with non-defence British companies.

In January 2016, the SSRO announced that Michael Fallon, the Secretary of State for Defence, had not accepted the SSRO's recommendation that there should be different rates for different types of work. He did however, accept that the way comparisons are made should be changed.

On 9 February 2016 the SSRO's chair Jeremy Newman resigned. The Telegraph's Alan Tovey claimed sources had told him this was because Newman was frustrated by interference from the Ministry of Defence, which was allegedly preventing the SSRO from doing its job. Newman was replaced by Clive Tucker as interim chair.

In March 2016, the SSRO set the next year's baseline profit rate at 8.95%, which was lower than the previous rate of 10.6%. Clive Tucker said: "It was determined by looking at the profit rates achieved by a more international and a more appropriate range of companies than had been considered under the old 'Yellow Book' arrangements. (Note: The former profit rules were contained in Government Profit Formula and its Associated Arrangements (GPFAA), colloquially known as the "Yellow Book", which was based on a Memorandum of Agreement (MoA) signed in 1968 by the UK Government and the Confederation of British Industry and which established the Review Board for Government Contracts.) Previously, only companies headquartered in the UK were considered, including some with little or no relevance to defence, such as retail, pharmaceuticals and tobacco companies. This new baseline profit rate now strikes the right balance between delivering a fair return for industry and ensuring value for money for the taxpayer."

In May 2016, the SSRO ordered defence contractor Rolls-Royce to cut its costs. The Telegraph's Alan Tovey described this as a watchdog "showing its teeth for the first time".

In July 2016, the SSRO issued a press release claiming that defence contractors were failing to comply with the new regulations. It listed examples of defence contractor costs which had been inappropriately passed to the Ministry of Defence and the taxpayer. These included £34,000 for 'staff welfare' which included the cost of a Christmas Party. The contractors get reimbursed for these costs plus profit.

In October 2016, SSRO chair Clive Tucker resigned. The Telegraph's Alan Tovey cited sources who said that, as with Newman six months earlier, frustration with the Ministry of Defence was the reason Tucker had resigned. Tucker was later replaced with George Jenkins.

In December 2016, SSRO Chief Executive told a parliamentary committee that the Ministry of Defence and defence contractors were not complying with the SSRO's requests for information. Of the 860 request for information made, she said, only about 200 had been answered.

A National Audit Office investigation reporting in 2017 noted that:

- By July 2017, 95 contracts and 15 sub-contracts had been brought within the scope of the regulations.
- These contracts reflected a combined value of £23.9 billion.
- Ministry of Defence staff had "welcomed" the introduction of the new system of controls and the ability to recognise "excess profits" being earned by sole source contractors.

The report confirmed that the failure of suppliers to provide information when requested remained a problem, especially where contracts previously let had subsequently been brought within the scope of the new controls.
