= Sponsored Reserves =

Force category in the British military

The Sponsored Reserves are a category of reserve forces in the British Armed Forces, created by the Reserve Forces Act 1996. It allows for certain support or specialist tasks to be carried out by trained professionals, who also maintain a civilian career. The Royal Fleet Auxiliary, for example, are sponsored reserves subject to the Armed Forces Act.

The first sponsored reserve unit was the Mobile Meteorological Unit, providing mainly aviation weather services to the RAF and the Army Air Corps. Other Sponsored Reserve Units have been developed in line with the 1998 Strategic Defence Review.

== See also ==
- Volunteer Reserves
- Regular Reserve
