= Armed Forces Act =

Stock short title used for legislation

Armed Forces Act (with its variations) is a stock short title used for legislation in India, Malaysia and the United Kingdom relating to armed forces. The bill for an act with this short title will usually have been known as an Armed Forces Bill during its passage through Parliament.

Armed Forces Acts may be a generic name either for legislation bearing that short title or for all legislation which relates to armed forces.

In the United Kingdom, an Armed Forces Act must be passed every five years to enable the maintenance of a standing army, which would otherwise be illegal under the Bill of Rights 1689.

== List ==
=== India ===
- Armed Forces (Special Powers) Acts

=== Malaysia ===
- Armed Forces Act 1972

=== United Kingdom ===
- Armed Forces (Housing Loans) Act 1949 (12, 13 & 14 Geo. 6. c. 77)
- Armed Forces (Housing Loans) Act 1958 (7 & 8 Eliz. 2. c. 1)
- Armed Forces (Housing Loans) Act 1965 (c. 9)
- Armed Forces Act 1966 (c. 45)
- Armed Forces Act 1971 (c. 33)
- Armed Forces Act 1976 (c. 52)
- Armed Forces Act 1981 (c. 55)
- Armed Forces Act 1986 (c. 21)
- Armed Forces Act 1991 (c. 62)
- Armed Forces Act 1996 (c. 46)
- Armed Forces Discipline Act 2000 (c. 4)
- Armed Forces Act 2001 (c. 19)
- Armed Forces (Pensions and Compensation) Act 2004 (c. 32)
- Armed Forces Act 2006 (c. 52)
- Armed Forces Act 2011 (c. 18)
- Armed Forces Act 2016 (c. 21)
- Armed Forces Act 2021 (c. 35)

== See also ==
- Defence Act
