= Wales University Officers' Training Corps =

Army reserve unit in Wales

The Wales University Officers' Training Corps (Wales UOTC) is an Army Reserve unit of the University Officers' Training Corps that recruits university students in Wales including at Cardiff University, Aberystwyth University, and Swansea University.

== History ==
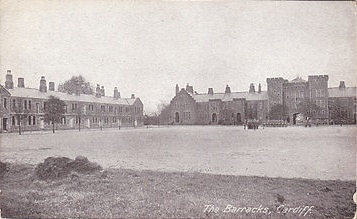
Maindy Barracks, home of Wales UOTC

In 1900 University College, Wales in Aberystwyth raised a company, sanctioned by the War Office, which was known as E Company of the 5th Volunteer Battalion, South Wales Borderers.

In 1908, the University College, Wales contingent of the Officers' Training Corps was formally raised in response to the recommendations of the committee formed by Lord Haldane.

In 1910, the University College of North Wales contingent followed and, in 1913, the University College of South Wales and Monmouthshire contingent was also raised.

== Universities ==
Affiliated universities include: Bangor, Aberystwyth, Swansea, Cardiff, Cardiff Metropolitan, University of South Wales, University of Wales Trinity St David and The Royal Welsh College of Music & Drama.

== Bibliography ==
- Spiers, Edward (2014). University Officers' Training Corps and the First World War (PDF). Council of Military Education Committees of the United Kingdom.
