= Mobile Meteorological Unit =

Deployable unit of the Royal Air Force

- Unit badge
- Active: 1962 – present
- Country: United Kingdom
- Branch: Royal Air Force and Met Office
- Type: Sponsored reserve unit
- Role: Weather forecasting
- Station: RAF Waddington
- Motto: Tomorrows weather today

The Mobile Meteorological Unit (MMU) is a Sponsored Reserve Unit of the Royal Air Force that provides meteorological and environmental support to deployed elements of the UK’s joint forces, in order to enhance the effectiveness of national or combined contingency operations. Principally but not exclusively aviation at target, base and the route in between.

== History ==
The unit was established in 1962 to support military exercises. It saw action in 1982 during the Falklands War when it set up a weather forecasting station on Ascension Island in the South Atlantic. It later relocated to RAF Stanley in the Falkland Islands and remained there until 1985, when civilian forecasters took over at RAF Mount Pleasant.

During the late 1990s it became apparent that the capacity of the MMU was becoming over-stretched as demands for the unit's services increased. To address the issue a major recruitment campaign was implemented over a five-year period and in August 2000 the MMU became the first ever Sponsored Reserve Unit in the British Armed Forces. The move was part of a policy of making greater use of skills in the civilian sector, whereby personnel provide specialist support to the military on operations, as a continuation of their regular peacetime work.

In 2005, the MMU moved from RAF Benson in Oxfordshire to RAF Scampton in Lincolnshire.

A Report by the Defence Select Committee in July 2006 recommended that the "importance of the Mobile Met Unit to the United Kingdom's Armed Forces should not be understated" and that "its role and work be more fully reported in the Met Office's Annual Report and Accounts".

The unit's motto of Tomorrow's weather today, is taken from the former No. 520 Squadron, which was a meteorological flight in Gibraltar during the Second World War.

== Role ==
The Mobile Meteorological Unit is an Air Combat Service Support Unit (ACSSU) and comprises meteorologists and engineers who normally work for the civilian Met Office but when required can be actively deployed as part of the military in times of war, crisis, peace-keeping operations and exercises in the UK or overseas.

Located at RAF Waddington in Lincolnshire, the MMU HQ is staffed by 13 full-time personnel, with the other 55 staff based at various Met Offices across the UK and Europe. These part-time members of the MMU are Met Office personnel with jobs as forecasters, observers and engineers, and deploy as RAF Reserve personnel on operations and exercises whenever tasked.

When deployed, the MMU can quickly establish a 'temporary Met Office', using portable weather displays mirroring those used by forecasters 'back at home'. The unit has previously deployed to the Middle East and Afghanistan. Personnel are also expected to deploy on exercises throughout the year; in 2006, 24 exercises were supported, a typical year for the MMU.

NATO Met Information System The MMU contributes to the safety and effectiveness of air and aviation operations in deployed theatres, particularly in areas experiencing extreme environmental conditions. For this reason, the small but vital air combat support role filled by the MMU will continue to underpin the expeditionary capability of the UK’s air and aviation components.
