= Volunteer Reserves (United Kingdom) =

British Armed Forces voluntary reserve force

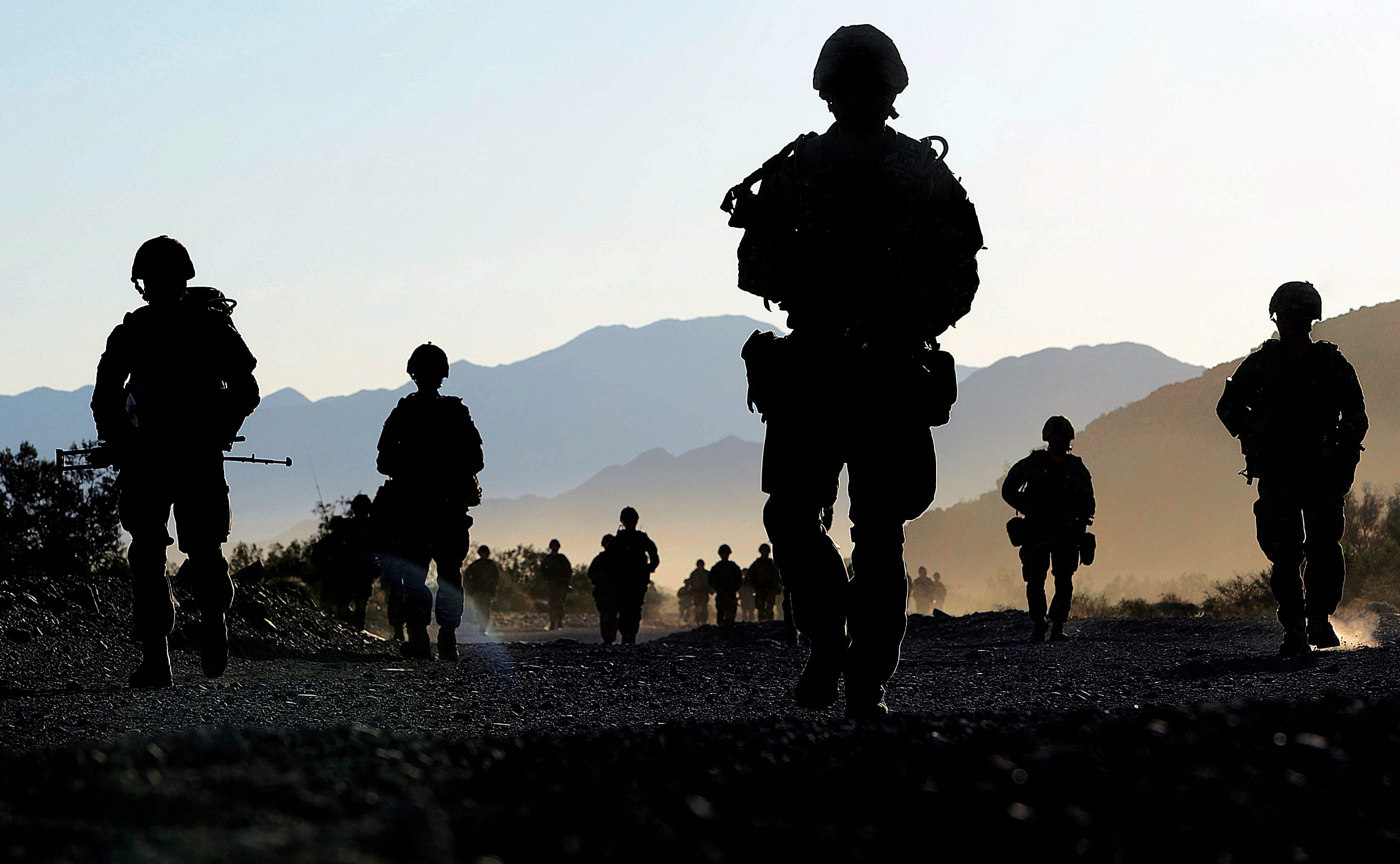
Royal Marines Reservists on exercise during 2013

The Volunteer Reserves are the British Armed Forces voluntary and part-time military reserve force. Unlike the Regular Reserve, the Volunteer Reserves do not consist of ex-Regular personnel who remain liable to be re-called for military service. (Note: However ex-Regulars are eligible to join.) Instead, the Volunteer Reserves consists of civilian volunteers who routinely undergo training and military operations alongside the Regular military. The Volunteer Reserves serve under a fixed-term reserve contract and provide "highly trained" military personnel integrated with their Regular counterparts, on operations both at home and overseas. For example, almost every major military operation has seen the deployment of Army Reservists alongside the Regular British Army. Volunteer Reserves are allowed to use the post-nominal letters VR after 10 years of service.

The Volunteer Reserves also includes the armed forces University Service Units (incl. below). These reserve units receive training designed to fit around their undergraduate degrees and seek to develop leadership, as well as partaking in military exercises, and opportunities outside of their degree including adventurous training and expeditions, members of these units have 'no call out liability' (See below) during their time in their respective USU unit. Members are under no obligation to continue training with the armed forces after university.

== Volunteer Reserve units ==
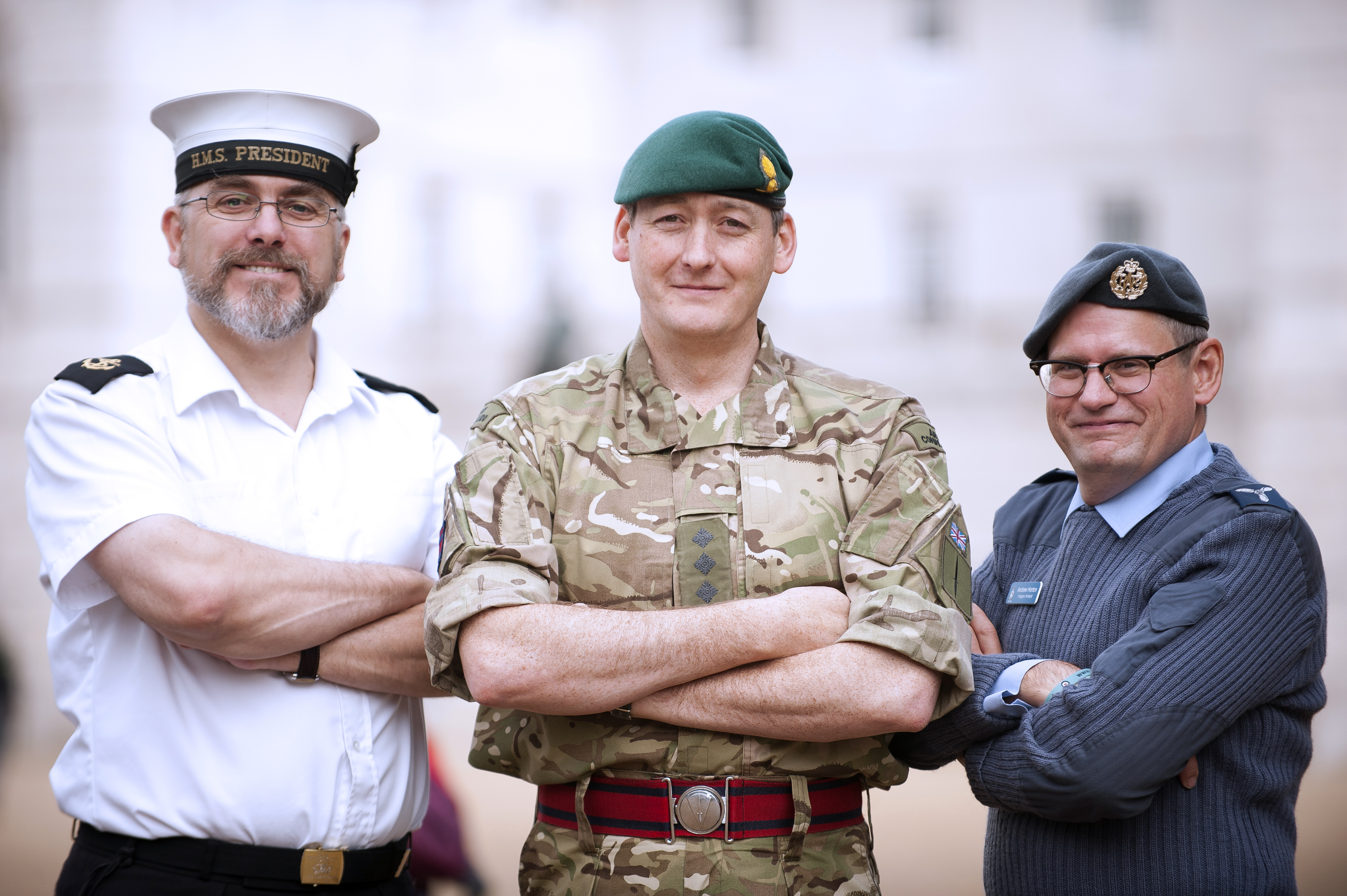
A Reservist from each of the three main reserve services. From left, a Royal Naval Reservist, Army Reservist and Royal Air Force Reservist.

The Volunteer Reserves primarily consist of four elements, each being an integrated part of their parent service and liable for military operations. University Service Units are listed alongside the service they fall under:

- Army Reserve – (incl. Officers' Training Corps)
- Maritime Reserve
  - Royal Naval Reserve – (incl. University Royal Naval Units)
  - Royal Marines Reserve
- RAF Reserve
  - Royal Auxiliary Air Force
  - Royal Air Force Volunteer Reserve – (incl. University Air Squadron)

== Call-out ==
A call-out is the mobilisation in part or in full of the Volunteer Reserves into active duty.

=== Full mobilisation ===
Under the Reserve Forces Act 1996 and standing orders, fully mobilising or "calling-out" the Volunteer Reserves for active service, can only be made by the monarch (who is the supreme commanding authority of the armed forces) through a royal proclamation on the advice of the Secretary of State for Defence, under specific, emergency circumstances:

(a) if it appears to [The King] that national danger is imminent or that a great emergency has arisen; or

(b) in the event of an actual or apprehended attack on the United Kingdom.

=== Limited mobilisation ===
However, in the case of lesser events, the Secretary of State can call-out those who have accepted a "special agreement" making them liable for up to 12 months of active service if required.

=== Exemptions ===
University students who are reservists in University Service Units are exempt from both forms of "calling-out," while at their university unit.

== See also ==
- Regular Reserve
- Reserve Forces and Cadets Association
- Maritime Reserve - a term used for the grouping together of the Royal Naval and Royal Marines Reserve
- Sponsored Reserves
