= Regular Reserve (United Kingdom) =

Component of the military reserve of the British Armed Forces

The Regular Reserve is the component of the military reserve of the British Armed Forces whose members have formerly served in the "Regular" (full-time professional) forces. Other components of the Reserve are the Volunteer Reserves and the Sponsored Reserves. The Regular Reserve largely consists of ex-Regular personnel who retain a statutory liability for service and are liable to be recalled for active military duty "in case of imminent national danger or great emergency". It also consists of a smaller number of ex-Regulars who serve under a fixed-term reserve contract (similar in nature to the Volunteer Reserves) and are liable for reporting, training and deploying on operations.

Since April 2013, Ministry of Defence publications have not reported the entire strength of the Regular Reserve; instead, only Regular Reserves serving under the fixed-term reserve contract are counted. As of 2014, they had a strength of 45,110 personnel. Of those, approximately 2,450 were serving alongside the Regular military in active service.

== Regular Reserves ==
=== Army Reserve (Regular) ===
==== Historically ====
The Regular Reserve of the British Army was originally created under the Reserve Force Act 1859 (22 & 23 Vict. c. 42) by Secretary of State for War Sidney Herbert, and re-organised under the Reserve Force Act 1867 (30 & 31 Vict. c. 110).

From the end of the Napoleonic Wars until 1847, men were enlisted for twenty-one years, practically for life. Thereafter, the term of enlistment was ten years, then twelve years. On completion of their enlistment, soldiers had the choice between accepting discharge without pension or to extend so as to accumulate 21 years of service. After many years with no trade other than that of soldiering, more than half of all discharged soldiers chose to re-enlist immediately. Of those who took a voluntary discharge, fully one in five signed on again within six months.

The Army's existing system of enlistment therefore produced an army of experienced or even veteran soldiers, but no class of reserves that could be recalled to serve in case of a national emergency. Under the Reserve Force Act 1867 (30 & 31 Vict. c. 110), a "First Class Army Reserve" had been created, of soldiers released from active service who had not completed their terms of service, to have an establishment of 20,000 men in theory. In practice, as of 1868, only 2,033 were in this body of men. The "Second Class Army Reserve" was to consist of army pensioners and of discharged soldiers having at least five years' regular service. The First Class Army Reserve was liable for overseas service in the event of war, whereas the Second Class Army Reserve was for home service to defend against invasion. Cardwell therefore brought before Parliament the idea of "short service". The Army Enlistment Act 1870 (33 && 34 Vict. c. 67) allowed a soldier to choose to spend time in the reserves after service with the colours. As to the proportion of time spent on active service with the colours versus the balance in the reserve, this was to be laid down from time to time by the Secretary of State for War.

Upon transferring to the Army Reserve, for the remainder of their 12 years, the soldier would be transferred to Section A or Section B, with Section C being subsumed into Section B in 1904. Section A was voluntary and limited, each infantry regiment being permitted about 50 men on their books. Section B was the normal destination for the balance of the 12 years enlistment.

Among the other benefits, this thereby enabled the British Army to have a ready pool of recently-trained men to draw upon in an emergency. The name of the Regular Reserve (which for a time was divided into a First Class and a Second Class) has resulted in confusion with the Reserve Forces, which were the pre-existing part-time, local-service home-defence forces that were auxiliary to the British Army (or Regular Force), but not originally part of it: the Honourable Artillery Company, Yeomanry, Militia (or Constitutional Force) and Volunteer Force. These were consequently also referred to as Auxiliary Forces or Local Forces.

In 1881, under the Childers Reforms short service was increased to seven years with the colours, and five with the reserve, of the twelve-year enlistment period that the Cardwell Reforms had introduced. This also introduced the ability for time-served soldiers to extend service in the reserve by four years, albeit classed as the second division, or Section D, of the First Class Army Reserve.

The Reserve Forces Act 1882 (45 & 46 Vict. c. 48) consolidated acts relating to the reserve.

By 1900 the reservists numbered about 80,000 trained men, still relatively young and available to be recalled to their units at short notice in the event of general mobilisation.

In August 1914, the line infantry could call upon 80,688 men of the Army Reserve, in addition to the Special Reserve. The Army Reserve soldiers were the first to be sent as drafts, with the Special Reserve second in precedence. Sixty percent of the infantry consisted of men recalled from the reserve. (Note: 'Altogether, the circumstances were very trying for the reservists, who formed 60 per cent of the infantry, and were for the most part still out of condition.') The Official History notes that Special Reserve drafts were despatched a month into the fighting, with the Army Reserve component having already being depleted. (Note: ‘It is significant of the heavy and unexpected wastage that within a month of firing the first shot, the supply of Regular Reservists for many regiments had been exhausted, and that men of the Special Reserve – the Militia of old days – were beginning to take their place.) To help remedy this, Army Council Instruction 118 dated 16 January 1915 was requesting Territorial Force men volunteering to transfer to the Army Reserve battalions.

The New Army was formed and recruited, following the outbreak of war. It required six months of training, and in theory, would be ready by late February 1915 at the very earliest. The challenge for the Special Reserve was to provide sufficient numbers of trained Reserves to offset casualties suffered by the regular battalions of the British Expeditionary Force, during this time. By the end of March 1915 more than thirty infantry regiments would see their trained reserves drop below 100 men.

As a cost-saving measure, the Special Reserve, renamed as the Militia once more, remained in abeyance. In March 1923 a special measure was introduced, whereby 10,000 men with war training were permitted to enlist directly into Class D of the Reserve, to increase the number of reservists.

==== Present day ====
Today, the Army Reserve (Regular) of the British Army consists of Regular Reserves serving under a fixed-term reserve contract and are by far the largest of the armed forces Regular Reserves. As of 2014 they numbered 30,030 personnel and are divided into two categories. Category A is mandatory, with ex-Regulars automatically falling into this category upon leaving Regular service. Category D is voluntary, for ex-Regulars who are no longer required to serve in category A, but wish to continue, this normally lasts until the age of 55. Ex-Regulars in both categories serve under the fixed-term reserve contract.

The Army Reserve (Regular) is distinct from and should not be confused with the British Army's Volunteer Reserve force of the same name, the Army Reserve.

=== Royal Fleet Reserve ===
==== Historically ====
The Royal Navy took inspiration from the Army's practice of encouraging its trained men to join a reserve that could be mobilised in an emergency. The Royal Fleet Reserve Classes A & B came into existence in 1900. The Royal Fleet Reserve Class C came into existence in 1903. (Note: 1903, the Special Service Engagements (SS) was introduced for 5 years service in the RN and 7 in the Royal Fleet Reserve Engagements & Time to Serve in Royal Navy) There was a Royal Fleet Reserve Long Service and Good Conduct Medal in place from 1922 onwards, in tandem with similar awards to the Royal Naval Reserve & Royal Naval Volunteer Reserve.

When war broke out in 1914, there was a surplus of men. As a consequence, some men of the Royal Fleet Reserve were posted to the Royal Naval Division.

==== Present Day ====
The RFR, in its original form as a separate grouping of trained ratings/ORs, ceased to be under the amended regulations of the Reserve Forces Act 1996. The successor to the Royal Fleet Reserve consists of ex-Regulars, having enlisted since 1 April 1997, serving under a fixed-term reserve contract. As of 2014, they had a strength of 7,960 personnel.

=== Air Force Reserve ===
==== Historically ====
Under the original terms of service in 1912, for both the Military and Naval wings, an airman would serve four years with the colours, then four in the reserve. Upon postwar demobilisation, airmen were transferred to RAF Reserve, Classes A-E & RAF Reserve Class G subcategories.

==== Present Day ====
As in the Army, Royal Air Force airmen serve the remainder of their 12-year contract in the Reserve, after being transferred to civilian life. The Air Force Reserve consists of ex-Regulars serving under a fixed-term reserve contract. As of 2014, they had a strength of 7,120 personnel.

== Other Regular Reserves and the Reserve Forces Act 1996 ==
The following elements of the Regular Reserve are no longer included or counted in Ministry of Defence publications and statistics on Reserve Forces and Cadets.

=== Regular Reserve – Long Term Reserve ===
British Army – "All male (but not female) soldiers who enlisted before 1 April 1997 have a statutory liability for service in the Long Term Reserve until their 45th birthday. Men and women who enlisted on or after 1 April 1997 serve for a total of 18 years or until age 55, in the Regular Reserve and Long Term Reserve combined from the date of completion of their full time Colour service. Long Term Reservists may only be recalled under Section 52 of the Reserve Forces Act (RFA) 1996, for home or overseas service, in case of imminent national danger or great emergency."

=== Regular Reserve – Pensioners ===
British Army – "Until age 60 those in receipt of an Army pension may be recalled under Section 52 of the RFA 96 for home or overseas service, in case of imminent national danger or great emergency. Present policy is not to recall a pensioner who is over the age of 55."

== See also ==
- Volunteer Reserve
- Military reserve force
- Reserve Forces Act 1996
- Sponsored Reserves

== Bibliography ==
- Benyon, Paul (July 2002). "Service Engagements - A Commitment to Serve for Specific Periods" – via RootsWeb.
- Biddulph, General Sir Robert (1904). Lord Cardwell at the War Office: a History of his Administration 1868 – 1874. London: John Murray. OCLC 316005611.
- Chandler, David G. (1996). The Oxford History of the British Army. Oxford: Oxford University Press. ISBN 0-19-285333-3.
- Edmonds, J. E. (2021) [1933]. Military Operations France and Belgium, 1914: Mons, the Retreat to the Seine, the Marne and the Aisne August–October 1914. History of the Great War. Vol. I (3rd ed.). Uckfield, East Sussex: Naval & Military Press. ISBN 978-1-78-331611-3.
- Gillott, Martin (January 2015). "British Line Infantry Reserves for the Great War - Part 3". Stand To! (102). The Western Front Association: 14–20.
- Goodenough, W. H.; Dalton, J. G. (1893). The Army Book for the British Empire. London: Harrison and Sons. OCLC 1013373372.
- Langley, David (June 2014). "British Line Infantry Reserves for the Great War - Part 1". Stand To! (100). The Western Front Association: 23–27.
- Langley, David (September 2014). "British Line Infantry Reserves for the Great War - Part 2". Stand To! (101). The Western Front Association: 27–31.
- McElwee, William (1974). The Art of War: Waterloo to Mons. London: Purnell. ISBN 0-253-31075-X.
- Raugh, Harold E. (2004). The Victorians at War, 1815-1914: An Encyclopedia of British Military History (illustrated ed.). ABC-CLIO. ISBN 1-57607-926-0.
- Skelley, Alan Ramsay (1977). The Victorian army at home: the recruitment and terms and conditions of the British regular, 1859-1899 (illustrated ed.). Taylor & Francis. ISBN 978-0-85664-335-4.
- "British Army - Regular Reserve" – via army.mod.uk.
- "MoD – reserves and cadet strengths 2014" (PDF).
- "UK Armed Forces Quarterly Personnel Report October 2014" (PDF).
- "Appendix XV - The Special Service Engagement (5 years in the RN and 7 in the Royal Fleet Reserve)". Kings Regulations & Admiralty Instructions - 1913 - Part II. 1913 – via RootsWeb.
