= Bolton Old Hall =

Grade II* listed building in Bolton-on-Swale, Richmondshire, North Yorkshire, England

Coordinates: 54°23′14″N 1°36′42″W

Bolton Old Hall is a historic building in Bolton-on-Swale, a village in North Yorkshire, in England.

The building was originally constructed as a three-storey peel tower, perhaps in the 1380s, by Richard Scrope, 1st Baron Scrope of Bolton. A two-storey south wing was added, probably in the 16th century, and then in 1680 the whole building was altered, the tower reduced to two storeys, and the windows replaced. It became the dower house for Kiplin Hall. In 1963, it was sold to the Stevenson family, who extended the building to provide five bedrooms, and planted exotic trees in the grounds. In 2021, it was put up for sale for £1.25 million.

The house has been Grade II* listed since 1969. A local tradition states that a tunnel runs from the house to the graveyard of St Mary's Church, Bolton-on-Swale.

The house is built of roughcast stone with quoins, and a pantile roof with stone coping and finials. The tower has been reduced to two storeys and has one bay, and recessed to the right is a later two-storey four-bay wing. In the ground floor of the tower is a sash window, over it is a blocked mullioned window, and above in the battlement are two arrowslits. On the front of the wing is a porch with panelled Tuscan pilasters, a frieze and a swan-neck pediment containing a chamfered panel carved with a fist holding a laurel wreath. The windows are sashes, in the ground floor with chamfered surrounds, and in the upper floor in architraves with keystones. The ground floor of the tower has plasterwork dating from 1680, and one of the first floor rooms also has a 17th-century plaster ceiling.

== See also ==
- Grade II* listed buildings in North Yorkshire (district)
- Listed buildings in Bolton-on-Swale
