= Listed buildings in Bolton-on-Swale =

Bolton-on-Swale is a civil parish in the county of North Yorkshire, England. It contains four listed buildings that are recorded in the National Heritage List for England. Of these, two are listed at Grade II*, the middle of the three grades, and the others are at Grade II, the lowest grade. The parish contains the village of Bolton-on-Swale and the surrounding area. All the listed buildings are in the village, and consist of a church, a memorial obelisk in the churchyard, a tower house, and a village pump.

== Key ==
Grade	Criteria
II*	Particularly important buildings of more than special interest
II	Buildings of national importance and special interest

== Buildings ==
Name and location	Photograph	Date	Notes	Grade
St Mary's Church; 54.38736°N 1.61290°W		14th century	The church has been altered and extended through the centuries, including a restoration in 1857 by G. Fowler Jones, and a remodelling of the chancel in 1877 by Eden Nesfield. The church is built in sandstone with Westmorland slate roofs. It consists of a nave, north and south aisles, a chancel with a north vestry and organ chamber, and a west tower. The tower has three stages, diagonal buttresses, a southeast stair turret, a three-light west window, a clock face on the west side, two-light bell openings, with cinquefoil heads, continuous decorated lintels and hood moulds, and an embattled parapet with coats of arms.	II*
Bolton Old Hall; 54.38717°N 1.61166°W	—	15th century	A former tower house that has been altered and extended, it is in roughcast stone with quoins, and a pantile roof with stone coping and finials. The tower has been reduced to two storeys and has one bay, and recessed to the right is a later two-storey four-bay wing. In the ground floor of the tower is a sash window, over it is a blocked mullioned window, and above in the battlement are two arrowslits. On the front of the wing is a porch with panelled Tuscan pilasters, a frieze and a swan-neck pediment containing a chamfered panel carved with a fist holding a laurel wreath. The windows are sashes, in the ground floor with chamfered surrounds, and in the upper floor in architraves with keystones.	II*
Jenkins Obelisk; 54.38746°N 1.61328°W		1743	The memorial in the churchyard of St Mary's Church commemorates Henry Jenkins, who is reputed to have lived to the age of 169. It is in sandstone, about 5 metres (16 ft) high, and consists of a pyramidal obelisk with a coved diamond finial on a square base forming a dado. On the east side of the base is an inscription.	II
Village pump 54.38794°N 1.61468°W		c. 1900	The village pump stands under a canopy by a road junction, it is about 1 metre (3 ft 3 in) high, and about 250 millimetres (9.8 in) square. The pump has an oak casing with a ball finial, a wrought iron handle, and a lead spout discharging into a stone basin. The canopy is square, and consists of four posts and dipped rails, pendant ball finials, and a slate roof, the angles lead-covered.	II
