= Kiplin Hall =

Grade I listed house in North Yorkshire, England

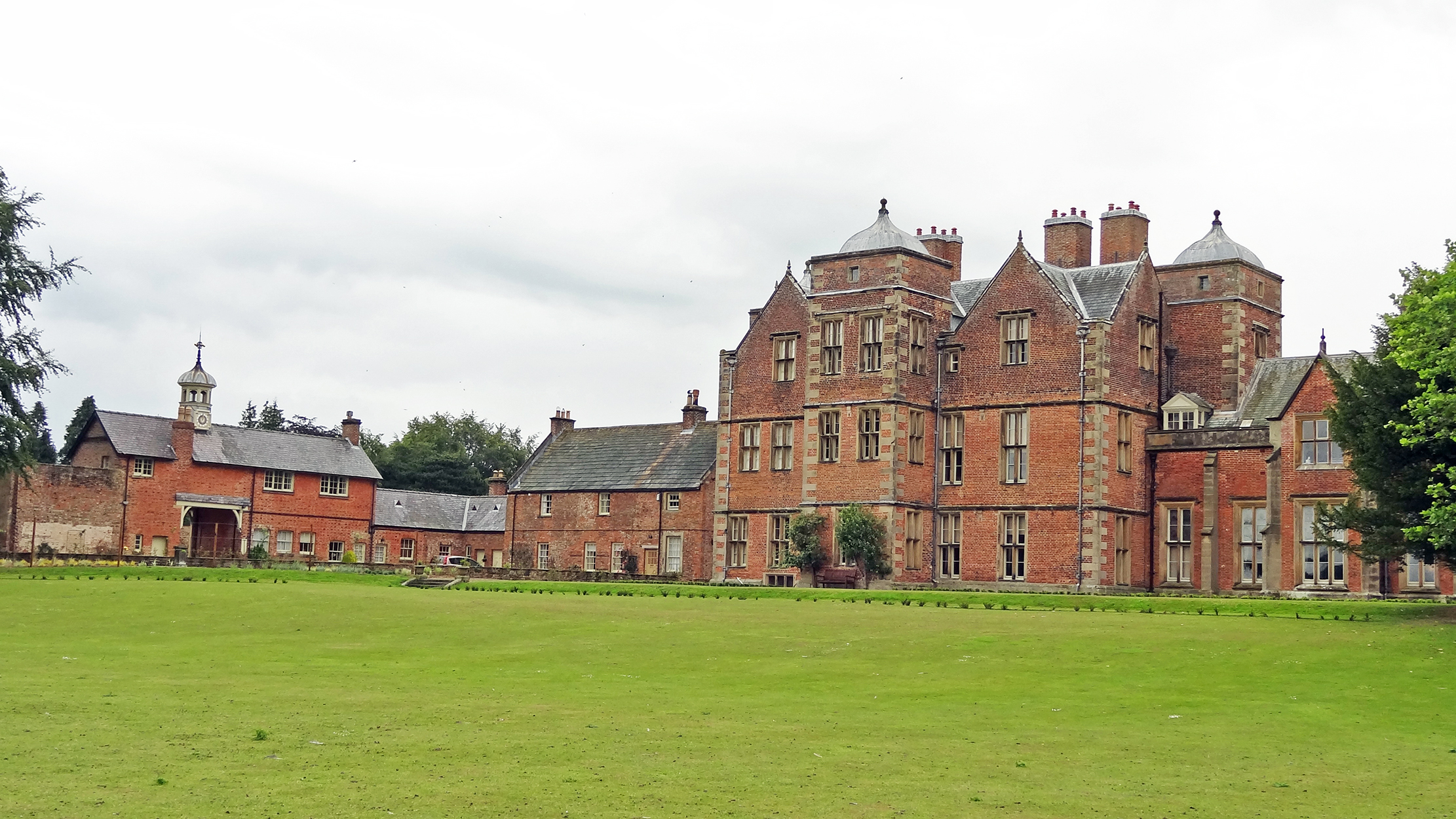
- The west front of Kiplin Hall, viewed from the lake
- Location: Kiplin, North Yorkshire, England
- Coordinates: 54.3721°N 1.5791°W
- Area: Vale of Mowbray
- Built: 1622–1625
- Architectural style(s): Jacobean architecture

Listed Building – Grade I
- Reference no.: 1226284

Kiplin Hall is a Jacobean historic house at Kiplin in North Yorkshire, England, and a Grade I listed building. It is not far from the River Swale in the Vale of Mowbray. Kiplin Hall is a museum of history, a gallery and provides a biographical record of its past English country house owners. The nearest villages are Scorton, Great Langton and Bolton-on-Swale.

== Early settlement ==
As with many great estates, the history of Kiplin was shaped by the 16th-century religious conflicts around the Reformation. The land was originally a monastic holding under the ownership of Easby Abbey. Following the Dissolution of the Monasteries, the land at Kiplin passed to John Scrope, 8th Baron Scrope of Bolton, and then to Thomas Wharton, 2nd Baron Wharton.

== Seventeenth century founding ==
The house was built sometime during 1622–1625 for George Calvert, 1st Baron Baltimore.

Initially built as a hunting lodge, it was a slightly rectangular building fashioned of red brick with diamond patterning known as diapering formed from blue-black headers incorporated into the brick bond. Kiplin had four towers, which unusually were not placed at the corners of the structure but at the centre of each of the four walls, the north and south towers containing staircases whilst the east and west comprised part of the rooms in which they were contained. At the summit of each tower is an ogee dome.

== Eighteenth century ==
In 1722 Charles Calvert, found himself in financial difficulties and sold the Kiplin estate to his mother's second husband (his stepfather), Christopher Crowe, for £7,000 (equivalent to £1,390,000 in 2023). Crowe had been British Consul in Livorno, Tuscany, and enjoyed the lucrative contract for supplying the British naval fleet with wine and olive oil. Combined with his activities in collecting antiquities for the British aristocracy his wealth and power grew. He found the hundred-year-old house lacking comfort – the Calverts had never lived there – and set about a renovation programme including the addition of a grand staircase, fireplaces and dado rails as well as a servants' wing to the north (much of which was demolished in the 1970s). Crowe enlarged the Kiplin estate to some 4,000 acres.

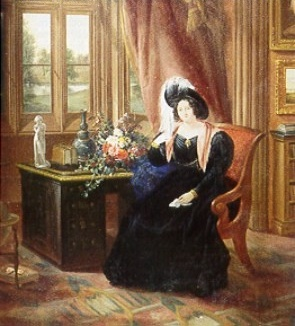
Sarah Carpenter, Lady Tyrconnell, in the Gothic Drawing Room of Kiplin Hall, 1833.

== Nineteenth century ==
In 1817 Christopher Crowe's great-granddaughter Sarah Crowe married John Delaval Carpenter, fourth (and final) Earl of Tyrconnell of the fourth creation. The first Earl's daughter, Almeria Carpenter, had been mistress to Prince William Henry, Duke of Gloucester and Edinburgh and her portrait by Angelica Kauffmann is displayed in the dining room.

Lady Tyrconnell inherited Kiplin the following year and in 1819 commissioned the architect Peter Frederick Robinson to build a wing to the south. Built in 'Wyatville's Gothic', this room was initially a Gothic-style drawing room. After 30 years of marriage the couple had one daughter, Elizabeth, who died the day she was born. They were now faced with the problem of to whom they might pass the Hall and estate on their own deaths. Predeceased by her husband, in 1868 Sarah died, leaving the estate to John Carpenter's first cousin twice removed, Captain Walter Cecil Talbot.

Talbot was the second son of Henry John Chetwynd-Talbot, 18th Earl of Shrewsbury and inherited Kiplin Hall on condition that he legally change his surname to Carpenter, marry a Protestant and submit to a seven-yearly examination of his faith by a team of Anglican clergy. He accepted these conditions and inherited the estate in 1868, eventually taking up residence in 1887. He instructed the architect William Eden Nesfield to add a further floor to the Gothic-style drawing room and the space was converted to a Jacobean-style library. His second wife, Beatrice de Grey, was prominent in the Arts and Crafts movement and the Hall contains some beautiful works by local craftsmen in this style. Eventually he was promoted to Admiral but died on a trip to London in 1904 and his only daughter, Sarah Marie Talbot Carpenter, inherited.

== Twentieth century ==
Sarah Talbot Carpenter married Christopher Hatton Turnor from Stoke Rochford in Lincolnshire in 1907 but they had no children. The couple never resided at Kiplin and the house was let. Five sales of land reduced the estate to 120 acres and disposed of many of the tenant farms, land and cottages that had contributed to its running. The estate entered virtually a century of decline. Much of the nearby local landscape has since been extensively quarried for sand and gravel extraction.

In 1937 Sarah Turnor shared ownership of the Hall with her first cousin, Bridget Elizabeth Talbot, daughter of the Admiral's youngest brother, Alfred. Miss Talbot had happy memories of visiting the estate in her childhood and had previously campaigned to save the Ashridge Estate near her home in Little Gaddesden (near Berkhamsted). In an attempt to capitalise on the connection with Maryland (see above) she advertised the Hall as a guest house to American visitors and as a conference centre.

Bridget Talbot was a rather "remarkable woman who received the Italian Medal for Valour for her work with the Red Cross on the Italian-Austrian front during the First World War and who invented a waterproof torch for lifebelts which saved the lives of many seamen during the Second World War. She stood as a Liberal Party candidate for Bermondsey in 1950. Bridget Talbot was awarded for her service the Italian Medal of Military Valor (Medaglia d'oro al Valore Militare) for exceptional valour as a nurse, Croce di Guerra (Croce al Merito di Guerra) and the British Order of the British Empire as an Officer (O.B.E.).

From 1937 until 1958 she tried to interest the National Trust in taking over Kiplin but it remained largely indifferent, considering the Hall of little historical significance and insisting that the north and south wings, which were later additions, would have to be demolished.

During the Second World War the Hall was requisitioned by the Royal Air Force and used as a maintenance unit, storing and supplying armaments for local airfields at RAF Catterick, RAF Croft and RAF Middleton St George. In addition some of the rooms were converted to flats for officers’ use and it was used by men from the 1st Battalion of the East Lancashire Regiment as a place to recover after being rescued at Dunkirk.

In February 1968 Miss Talbot set up the Kiplin Hall Trust, its purpose being to hold Kiplin Hall and its appurtenances in trust permanently to preserve them for the benefit of the nation as a place of beauty and historical and architectural interest. Bridget Talbot died in November 1971, leaving the contents of the Hall to the Trust, which still cares for the Hall and estate today.

== Twenty-first century ==
Following extensive renovation and refurbishment the property is now open to the public, and represents an insight into almost four centuries of life in North Yorkshire.

A permanent exhibition charts the founding of the American state of Maryland by George Calvert, and the lives of the families who lived in Kiplin Hall through the centuries.

Historic records of Kiplin Hall and its families from the early 18th century to the 21st century are held at the North Yorkshire County Record Office in Northallerton and at Kiplin Hall.

Kiplin Hall provides programmes that support the National Curriculum Attainment Targets in art, art and design, patterns/materials/buildings, geography, history, physical education and science. Specific programmes include Victorian Childhood, Portraits, Patterns and Materials, Nature Detectives and the Second World War – How children lived (KS2 only).

== Collaboration ==
In 1986 the University of Maryland, with funding from the state of Maryland, opened the University of Maryland Study Center at Kiplin Hall, established a resource "built out of what was originally a stable house and blacksmith’s shop." It is open for students in the School of Architecture, Planning and Preservation.

Washington College in Maryland offers a three-week summer course in English Literature. Lectures are presented each morning and students participate in afternoon field excursions that include historic, literary, landscape and architectural sites of interest. Influential literary figures such as Wordsworth, Coleridge and Shelley found the area around Kiplin Hall inspiring to their works.

The University of South Carolina has a summer course (Hist 786) in England to "provide comparisons with U.S. theory and practice in archives administration, museum management, and historic preservation. It offers behind-the-scenes tours of museums and historic sites, as well as meetings with curators, archivists, administrators, and government officials to discuss the practice of public history in the UK." This includes a field school at Kiplin Hall.

== Awards ==
Kiplin Hall received two Hudson's Heritage Awards in two categories "at a prestigious awards ceremony in London" on 3 December 2012. One was England's "Hidden Gem" award and the other was for the "Best New Discovery".

== See also ==
- Grade I listed buildings in North Yorkshire (district)
- Listed buildings in Kiplin

== Images ==
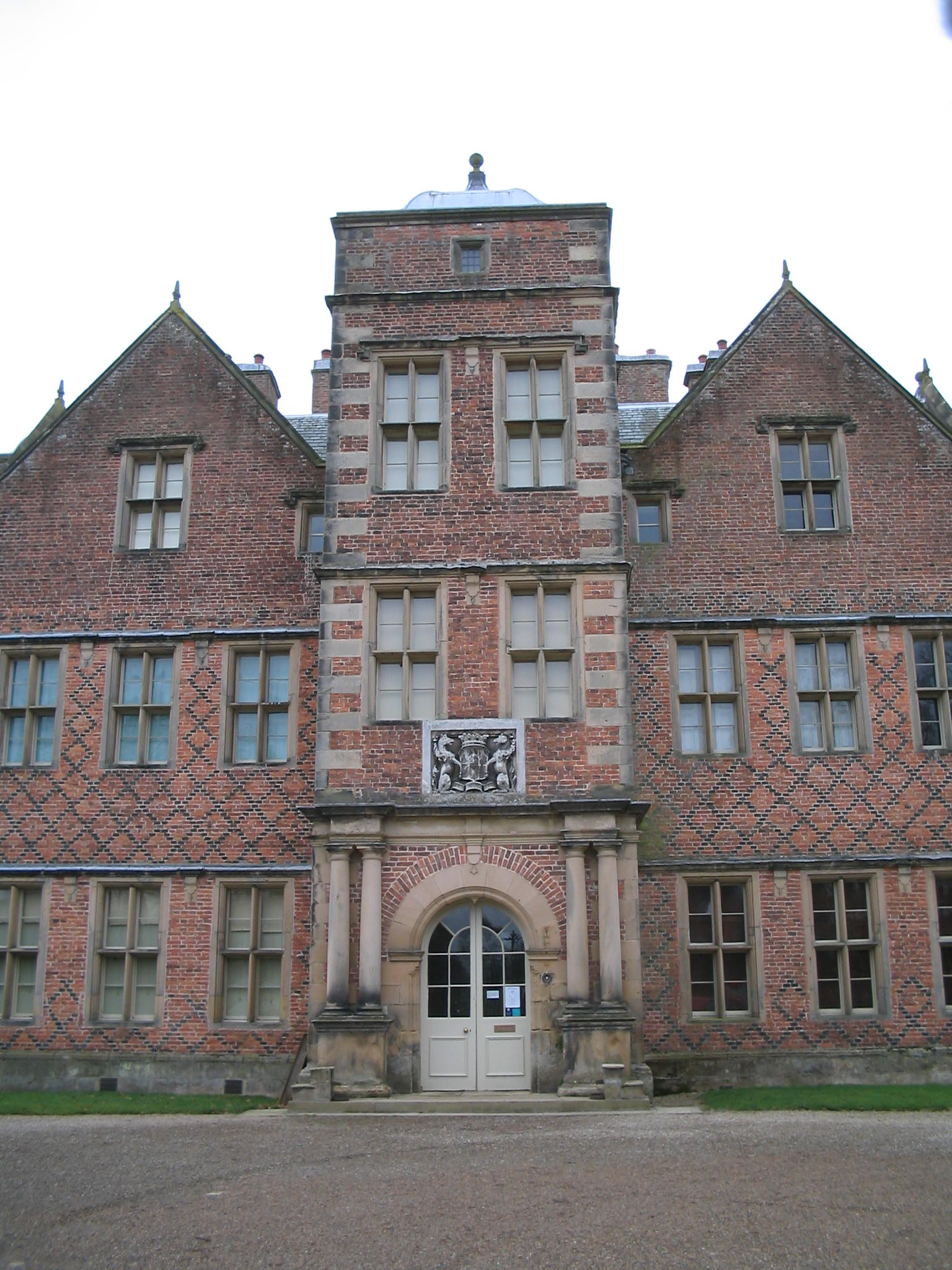
Front of the hall and main entrance

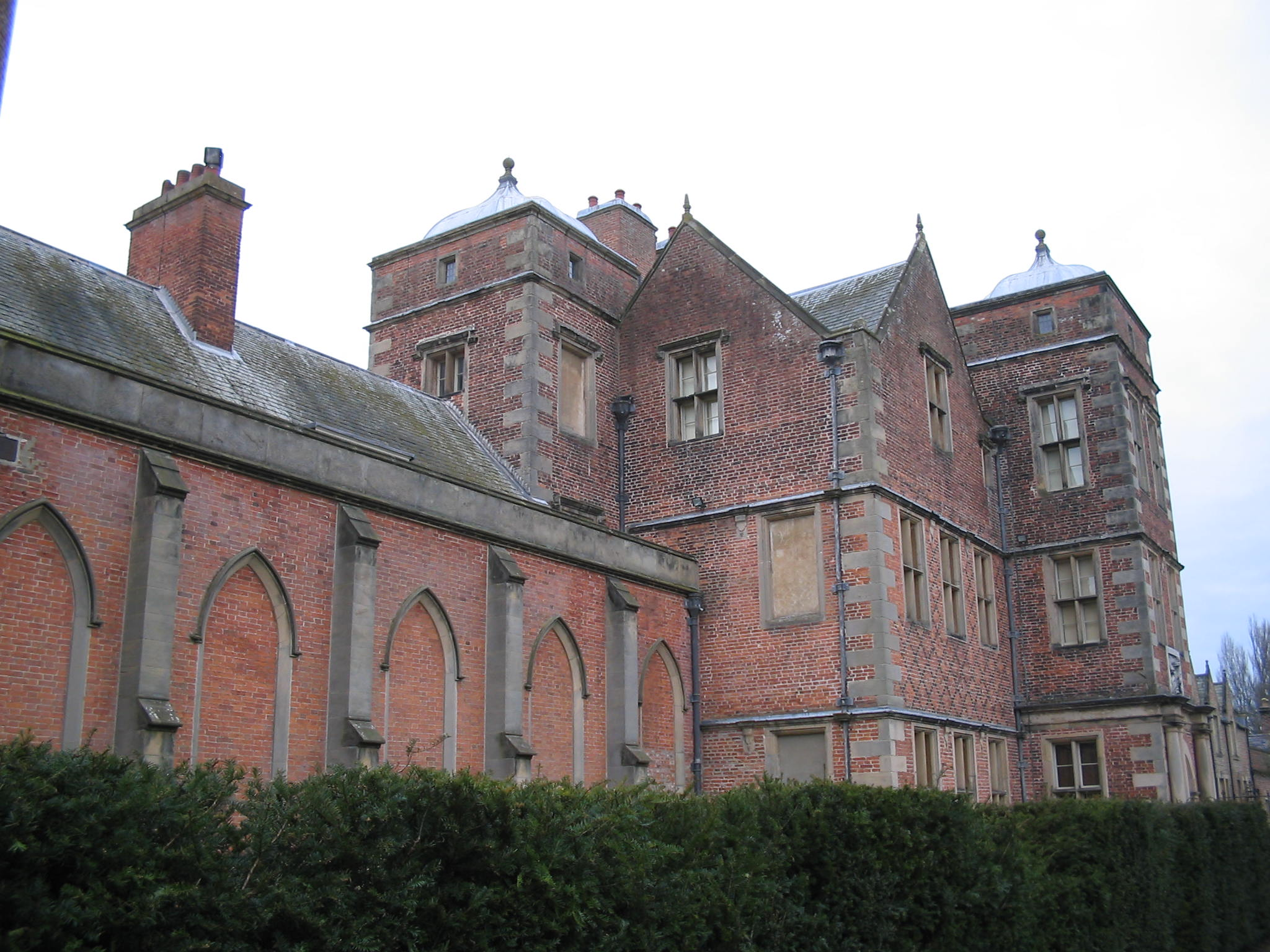
Front of the hall showing the later library extension

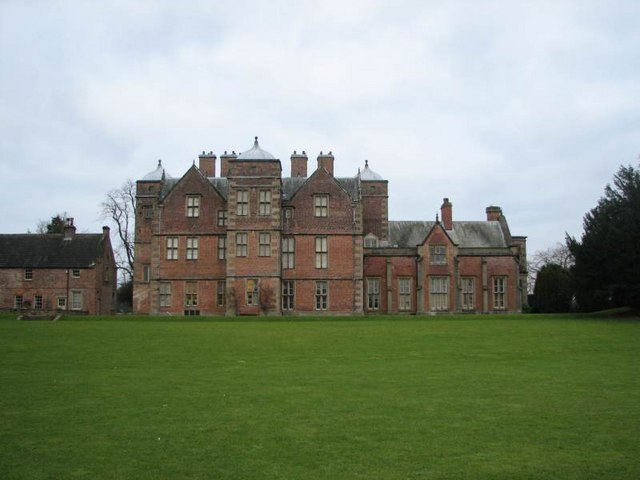
Back of hall from lakeside
