= Kiplin =

Hamlet in North Yorkshire, England

Coordinates: 54.36855°N 1.57291°W

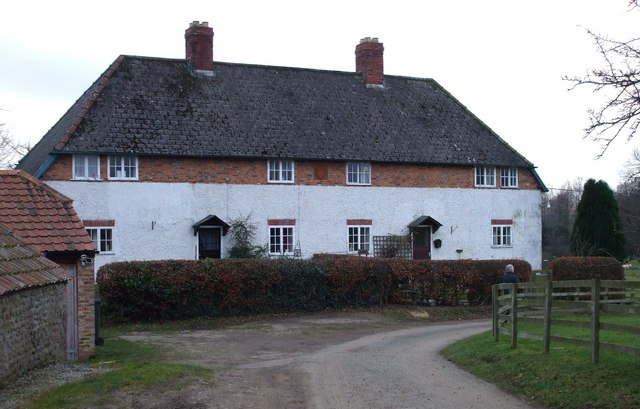
- Cottages at Kiplin

- Location within North Yorkshire
- Population: 60 (2015)
- OS grid reference: SE278970
- Civil parish: Kiplin
- Unitary authority: North Yorkshire
- Ceremonial county: North Yorkshire
- Region: Yorkshire and the Humber
- Country: England
- Sovereign state: United Kingdom
- Post town: RICHMOND
- Postcode district: DL10
- Police: North Yorkshire
- Fire: North Yorkshire
- Ambulance: Yorkshire

Kiplin is a small hamlet and civil parish in the county of North Yorkshire, England. The population of the civil parish in 2015 was estimated by North Yorkshire County Council to be 60. As the population was less than 100, it was not separately counted in the 2011 census but included with the civil parish of Great Langton. Besides the hamlet of Kiplin, the civil parish includes Kiplin Hall, and is bisected by the B6271 road between Northallerton and Richmond, which cuts across the parish on a north-west to south-east axis.

Kiplin is too small to have a parish council, so has a parish meeting.

George Calvert, 1st Baron Baltimore and early coloniser of North America, was born there.

== Toponym ==
The place-name was first recorded in the Domesday Book of 1086, in the form Chipeling. The name probably means "the settlement of the Cippelings (the people of Cippa)". Cippa is an Old English personal name, probably also seen in the names of Chippenham and Cippenham.

== History ==
Kiplin was a manor in the ancient parish of Catterick in the North Riding of Yorkshire. In the middle ages it belonged to the Abbey of St Agatha. After the Dissolution it was acquired by Philip, Lord Wharton, and in 1619 was bought by Sir George Calvert, who built Kiplin Hall.

Kiplin became a separate civil parish in 1866. From 1894 to 1974 it was part of Northallerton Rural District. In 1974 it was transferred to the new county of North Yorkshire. From 1974 to 2023 it was part of the Hambleton District, it is now administered by the unitary North Yorkshire Council.

== See also ==
- Listed buildings in Kiplin
