= Forest, North Yorkshire =

Hamlet in North Yorkshire, England

Coordinates: 54.399°N 1.576°W

Forest
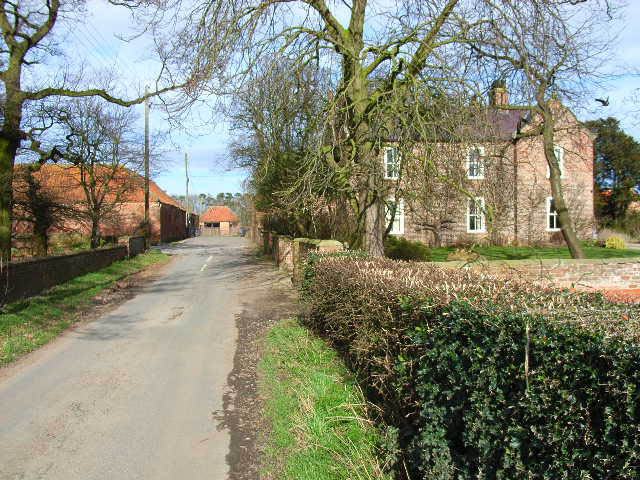
- The hamlet of Forest

- Location within North Yorkshire
- Population: 25
- OS grid reference: NZ276004
- Civil parish: Ellerton-on-Swale
- Unitary authority: North Yorkshire
- Ceremonial county: North Yorkshire
- Region: Yorkshire and the Humber
- Country: England
- Sovereign state: United Kingdom
- Post town: RICHMOND
- Postcode district: DL10
- Dialling code: 01748
- Police: North Yorkshire
- Fire: North Yorkshire
- Ambulance: Yorkshire
- UK Parliament: Richmond and Northallerton

Forest is a hamlet in North Yorkshire, England, near the town of Richmond. It is near the villages of Scorton and Bolton-on-Swale. From 1974 to 2023 it was part of the district of Richmondshire and is now administered by the unitary North Yorkshire Council.

The only public amenity in Forest is a red telephone box.

Forest is not served by any public transport.
