= Bridget Elizabeth Talbot =

Bridget Elizabeth Talbot (1885 – 29 November 1971), was a British politician and campaigner.

== Background ==
She was the daughter of the Hon. Alfred Chetwynd-Talbot, youngest son of the 18th Earl of Shrewsbury and Emily Louisa Augusta, eldest daughter of the 5th Baron Walsingham.

In 1914 she started the cultivation of co-operative gardens on waste land. The Ministry of Agriculture later adopted the scheme all over the country. She did much work with the Red Cross and refugee organizations in Belgium, Italy, Turkey, and Russia during and after the 1914–18 war. She received the Italian Medal for Valour for her work with the Anglo-Italian Red Cross on the Italian–Austrian front during the First World War from 1916 to 1919. She was awarded the [OBE] in 1920. From 1920 to 1922, she was in Turkey where she started a committee to deal with Russian refugees and later ran a co-operative farm colony in Asia Minor. She went to Russia in 1932, with Lady Muriel Paget’s Mission.

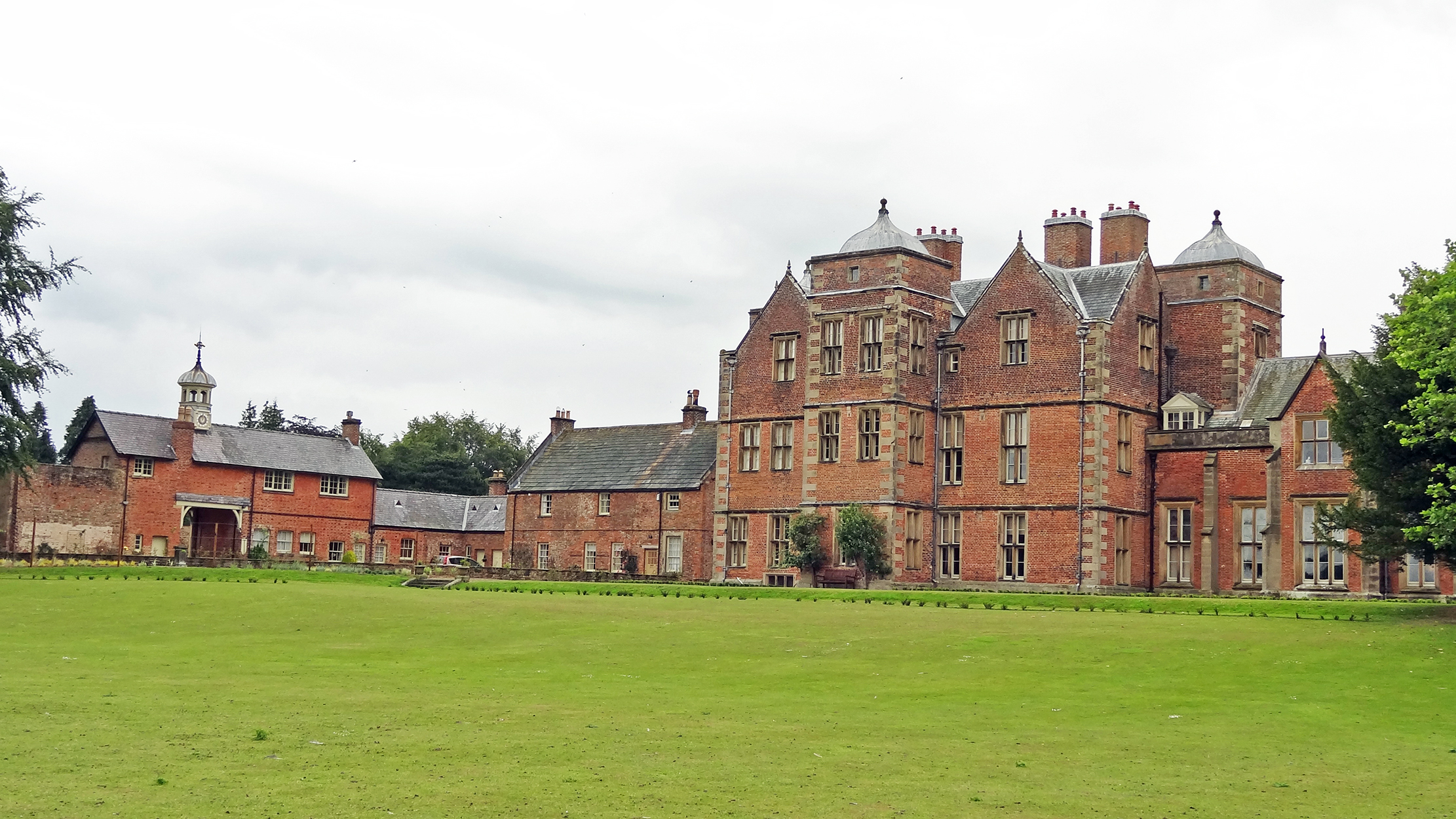
Kiplin Hall

She was instrumental in securing Ashridge Estate to the National Trust. In 1937 she took over joint ownership of Kiplin Hall in North Yorkshire. She retained an interest in the estate throughout the rest of her life. She invented a watertight electric torch for lifebelts and was instrumental in getting these made compulsory by Parliament for all MN, RAF and RN personnel, and so saved hundreds of lives during the Second World War.

== Politics ==
She joined the National Labour Party in 1931, assisting Ramsay MacDonald in his election campaign. She was a member of the National Labour Council. She campaigned energetically for improvements in the conditions of merchant seamen and in 1937 to gain first-hand experience served before the mast in a " windjammer" to Finland. In 1939 she started the National Labour enquiry into the state of the Merchant Navy. She also organized sports camps for blind soldiers from St. Dunstan's. She then joined the Liberal Party and was Liberal candidate for the Bermondsey Division of London at the 1950 General Election. Although it was a new seat, the area had not polled well for the Liberals since the 1920s.

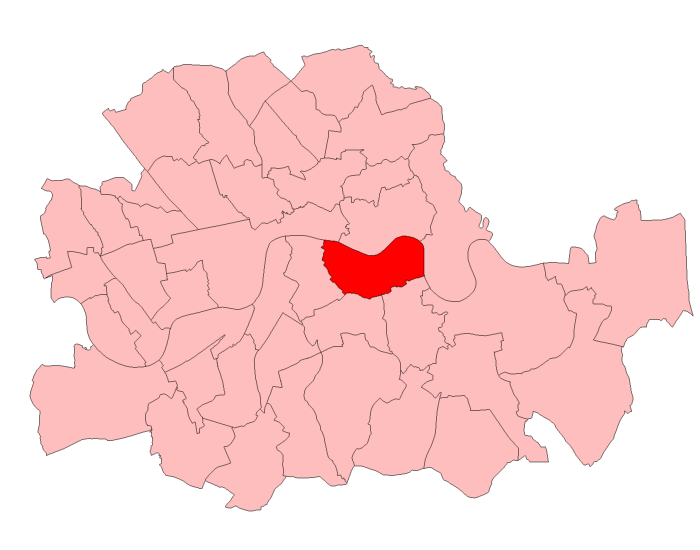
Bermondsey in London,1950

General Election 1950: Bermondsey
Party	Candidate	Votes	%	±%
Labour	Robert Joseph Mellish	26,018	76.9	
Conservative	F Warwick	5,964	17.6	
Liberal	Bridget Elizabeth Talbot	1,852	5.5	
Majority		20,054	59.3	
Turnout			79.7	
Labour win				

She did not stand for parliament again though in 1964 she considered standing as an Independent candidate for Richmond, Yorkshire. She was opposed to Britain joining the Common Market. She was Lord of the Manor of Scorton. She was hereditary Governor of Scorton Grammar School. She was vice-president of the Red Ensign Club. She was vice-president of the Watch Ashore Association. She was an Honorary Member of St Dunstan's Governing Committee. She was an Honorary Officer of the Roman Grenadier Guards (appointed following the battle of Monte Santo in 1917) She was awarded the Croce di Guerra.

== See also ==
- Kiplin Hall
