= Henry Jenkins (longevity claimant) =

British supercentenarian

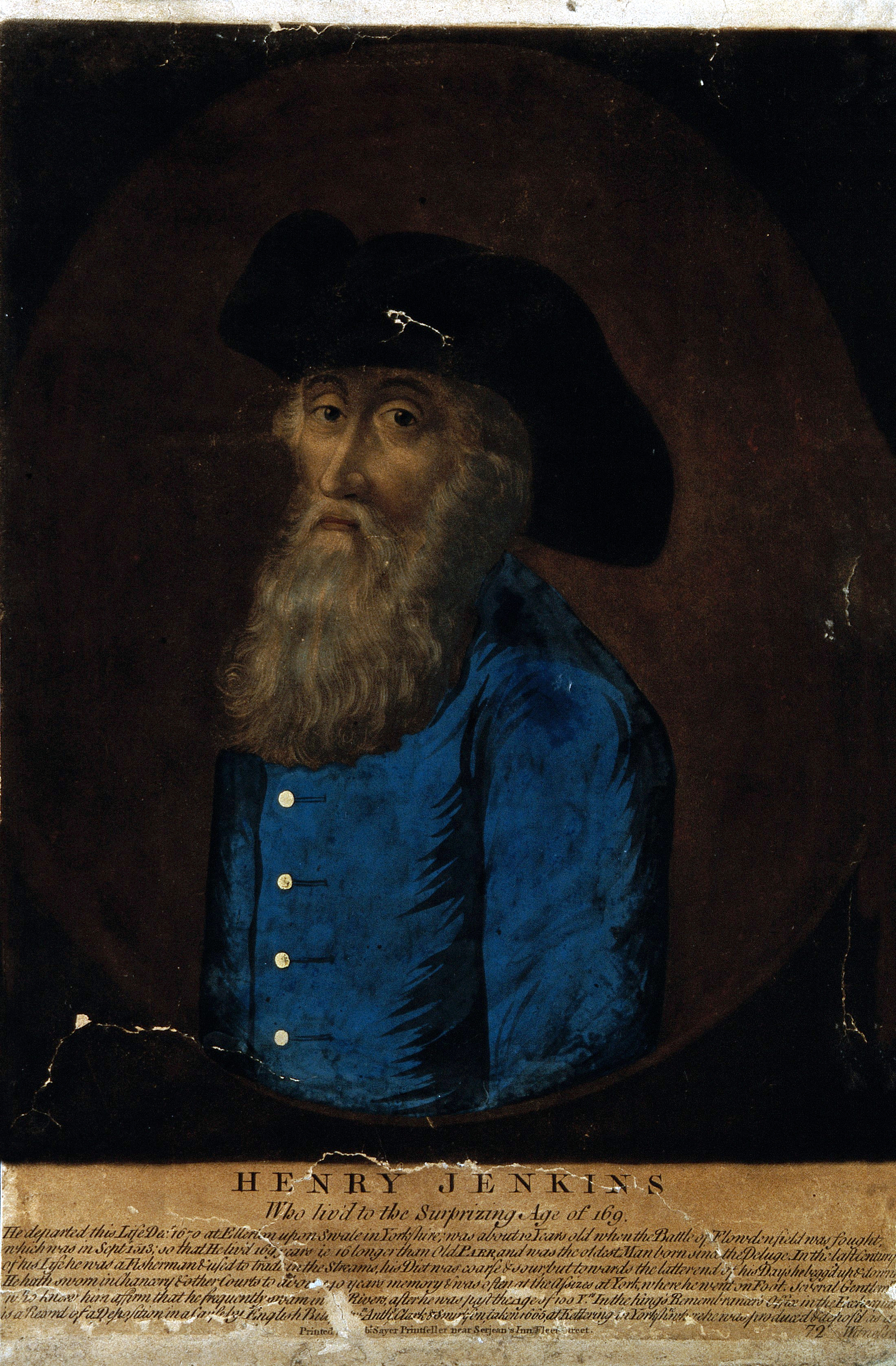
- Portrait of Henry Jenkins
- Born: 11 February 1501 (allegedly); Ellerton on Swale, Scorton, North Riding of Yorkshire, England
- Died: December 1670 (reputedly aged 169); Bolton-on-Swale, North Riding of Yorkshire, England
- Known for: Extreme longevity claim

Henry Jenkins (allegedly born 11 February 1501; buried on 9 December 1670 in Bolton-on-Swale, North Riding of Yorkshire) was an English supercentenarian claimant said to have been 169 years old at his death.

== Biography ==
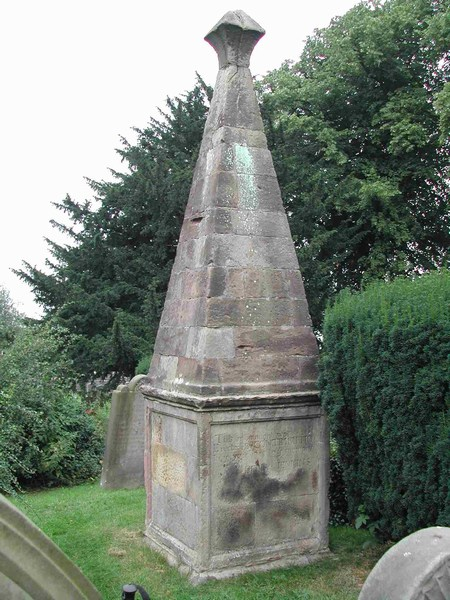
Memorial to Jenkins

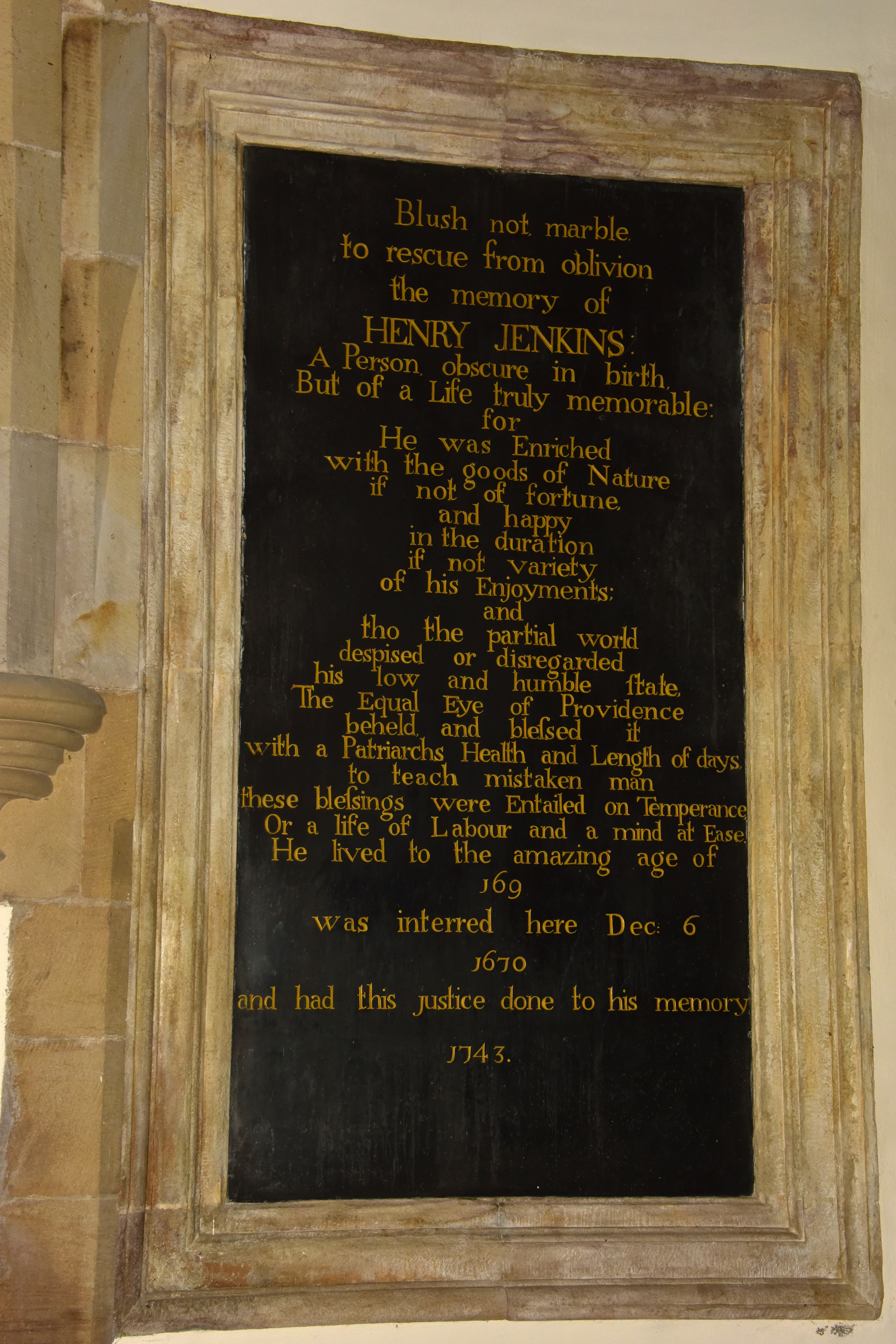
Memorial plaque

He claimed to have been born in 1501, although parish registers were not required to be maintained until 1538. It is known that he lived at Ellerton on Swale, Scorton, North Riding of Yorkshire and claimed to have been butler to Lord Conyers, of Hornby Castle, where the Abbot of Fountains was a frequent guest, and "did drink a hearty glass with his Lordship". He later followed the occupation of a fisherman and ended his life begging for alms. The Annals of Yorkshire affirm that he was born in Ellerton and that he also worked as a thatcher in his old age.

Chancery Court records show that in 1667 Jenkins stated on oath that he was aged "one hundreth fifty and seven or thereabouts"; when asked by the judge which notable battle he remembered, he named Flodden Field of 1513 and claimed to have carried arrows to the English archers.

When interrogated by Anne Savile (of the family of John Savile) on the subject (at the age of 162/163 to the best of his remembrance) he confirmed that he well remembered the dissolution of the monasteries. He remembered Henry VIII when he was between ten and twelve years of age and "I was sent to Northallerton with a horse-load of arrows; but they sent a bigger boy from thence to the army with them." When she asked him if the king was there he replied "No, he was in France, and the Earl of Surrey was General." Savile then sought the testimonies of four or five local centenarians, who confirmed that he was an elderly man ever since they knew him. Although his birth date is undocumented, the date of Jenkins's death is known to within days, as his burial is recorded in the parish register of Bolton-on-Swale as having occurred on 9 December 1670. He is described as "a very aged and poor man".

In 1743, in his memory an obelisk was erected in the churchyard, and a plaque made of black marble was placed inside the church; the inscription on it, composed by Dr Thomas Chapman, Master of Magdalene College, Cambridge, reads

Blush not, marble, to rescue from oblivion the memory of Henry Jenkins, a person obscure in birth, but of a life truly memorable, for he was enriched with the goods of nature if not of fortune, and happy in the duration if not the variety of his enjoyments. And though the partial world despised and disregarded his low and humble state, the equal eye of Providence beheld and blessed it with a patriarch's health and length of days, to teach mistaken man these blessings are entailed on temperance, a life of labour, and a mind at ease. He lived to the amazing age of 169; was interred here, December 6, 1670, and had this justice done to his memory, 1743.

In 1829, the journal The Mirror of Literature noted that, if Jenkins' longevity claims are to be believed, had he followed his legal obligations during his life he would have changed his religion eight times, between the reigns of Henry VII and Charles II.

T. H. White's science fiction novel The Master: An Adventure Story (1957) compares the eponymous character, aged 150, with Jenkins.

The village of Kirkby Malzeard, North Yorkshire, had a pub named Henry Jenkins after him, until it closed on 29 June 2008.
