= Thomas Kipling =

British churchman and academic

Thomas Kipling (1745 or 1746 – 28 January 1822) was a British churchman and academic.

He entered St John's College, Cambridge University in 1764 at age 18 and was senior wrangler in 1768. He received an M.A. in 1771, a B.D. in 1779, and a D.D. in 1784. He was Boyle Lecturer in 1792, and Master of the Temple in 1797. He was a Deputy Regius Professor of Divinity from 1787 to 1802, and Dean of Peterborough from 1798 to 1822.

Kipling was active as a prosecutor against William Frend for the latter's Unitarian views.

== Life ==
Born at Bowes, Yorkshire (now in County Durham), he was the son of William Kipling, a cattle salesman. He received his early education at Scorton and at Sedbergh School, and was admitted a sizar of St. John's College, Cambridge, on 28 June 1764. He graduated B.A. in 1768, was elected a fellow of his college 29 January 1770, and commenced M.A. in 1771. In 1773 he was elected one of the taxors of the university. He took the degree of B.D. in 1779. In 1782 he was elected Lady Margaret's preacher on the resignation of Richard Farmer. He was created D.D. in 1784, in which year he was presented by his college to the vicarage of Holme on Spalding Moor, Yorkshire. In 1787 he was appointed deputy regius professor of divinity, the professor, Richard Watson, being in ill-health. In 1792 he preached the Boyle lectures, but did not print the course.

In 1792 Kipling was attacked by liberals in the university for his part in promoting the prosecution of William Frend, Fellow of Jesus College who had attacked the established Church of England. On 10 February 1798 he was made Dean of Peterborough. In the summer of 1802 he resigned the deputy professorship of divinity.

When John Lingard's Strictures on Herbert Marsh's Comparative View of the Churches of England and Rome appeared in 1815, Kipling took offence at the terminology "modern church of England"; and thinking that it came within the category of "seditious words, in derogation of the established religion", wrote to Lingard through the public papers informing him that unless within a reasonable time he published a vindication of his "inflammatory language" he would be indicted. Lingard merely advertised his Strictures in all the papers which had published Kipling's letter; and the controversy died away. Jeremy Bentham mentioned a letter of Kipling of 1815 on schism in his Church-of-Englandism (1817), though a fuller treatment of points he wished to make against Kipling, Gerard Andrewes and Nicholas Vansittart was omitted for reasons of length.

Kipling died at his parsonage, after a lingering illness, on 28 January 1822.

== Works ==
Kipling's major work was Codex Theodori Bezæ Cantabrigiensis, Evangelia et Apostolorum Acta complectens, quadratis literis, Græco-Latinus. Academia auspicante venerandæ has vetustatis reliquias, summa qua potuit fide, adumbravit, expressit, edidit, Codicis historiam præfixit, notasque adjecit T. Kipling, Greek and Latin, 2 pts., Cambridge, 1793, printed at the university press. The impression was limited to 250 copies. This edition of the Codex Bezæ used types resembling the uncial characters of the original manuscript. It was criticised in the Monthly Review, new ser. xii. 241–6, and by Richard Porson in two notices in the British Critic, vol. iii. (1794); and the preface was attacked in a pamphlet entitled Remarks on Dr. Kipling's Preface to Beza. Part the first (London, 1793), by Thomas Edwards the vicar of Histon (no second part appeared). Errors in this edition and the bad latinity of the preface were mercilessly censured, so that in the slang of the university a "Kiplingism" came to be synonymous with a grammatical blunder. George Horne remarked that Kipling's work, although imperfect, was unfairly underrated. Frederick Henry Ambrose Scrivener, in the preface to his own edition of the Bezæ Codex Cantabrigiensis (Cambridge, 1864) defended Kipling's textual work, but not his adopted forms.

Kipling's other works were:

- 'The Elementary parts of Dr. Smith's Complete System of Optics,’ 1778.
- 'The Articles of the Church of England proved not to be Calvinistic,’ Cambridge, 1802, which was attacked by a writer under the signature of "Academicus", and drew forth a defence claiming to be by a friend of Kipling, but supposed to be by himself.
- 'Certain Accusations brought lately by the Irish Papists against British and Irish Protestants, of every denomination, examined,’ London, 1809; reprinted in 'The Churchman armed against the Errors of the Time,’ vol. ii. London, 1814. This was elicited by a reprint of Thomas Ward's 'Errata of the Protestant Bible.'

== Notes ==
Attribution

This article incorporates text from a publication now in the public domain: Cooper, Thompson (1892). "Kipling, Thomas". In Lee, Sidney (ed.). Dictionary of National Biography. Vol. 31. London: Smith, Elder & Co.

Church of England titles
Preceded by Peter Peckard	Dean of Peterborough; 1798 –1822	Succeeded by James Henry Monk
