= Listed buildings in Great Langton =

Great Langton is a civil parish in the county of North Yorkshire, England. It contains three listed buildings that are recorded in the National Heritage List for England. All the listed buildings are designated at Grade II, the lowest of the three grades, which is applied to "buildings of national importance and special interest". The parish contains the village of Great Langton and the surrounding countryside, and the listed buildings consist of a church and two farmhouses.

== Buildings ==
Name and location	Photograph	Date	Notes
St Wilfrid's Church; 54.36001°N 1.53677°W		12th century	The church has been altered and extended through the centuries. It is in rendered sandstone and has a stone slate roof. The church consists of a nave, a south porch, a chancel and a north vestry, and at the west end is a bellcote. The porch is gabled, and has a doorway with a chamfered surround, a pointed arch and a hood mould The inner doorway is Norman, and has columns with cushion capitals. In the chancel is a priest's door with a pointed arch, and at the east end is an angle buttress surmounted by a pinnacle.
White House Farmhouse; 54.37896°N 1.53621°W	—	Early to mid 18th century	The farmhouse is in red brick, with dentilled eaves, and a pantile roof with stone coping and shaped kneelers. On the front is a porch and a doorway in an architrave. The windows are a mix, consisting of casements and sashes, some horizontally-sliding.
Langton Farmhouse; 54.36213°N 1.55025°W	—	Mid to late 18th century	The farmhouse is in red brick with some stone, stone dressings, an eaves band, and a concrete tile roof with stone coping. There are two storeys and three bays, and a lower wing at the rear on the left. The doorway has a quoined surround, a fanlight, and a lintel with a keystone. The windows are sashes with flat stone arches. At the rear is a round-arched stair window with a keystone.
