= Charles Roe =

English businessman

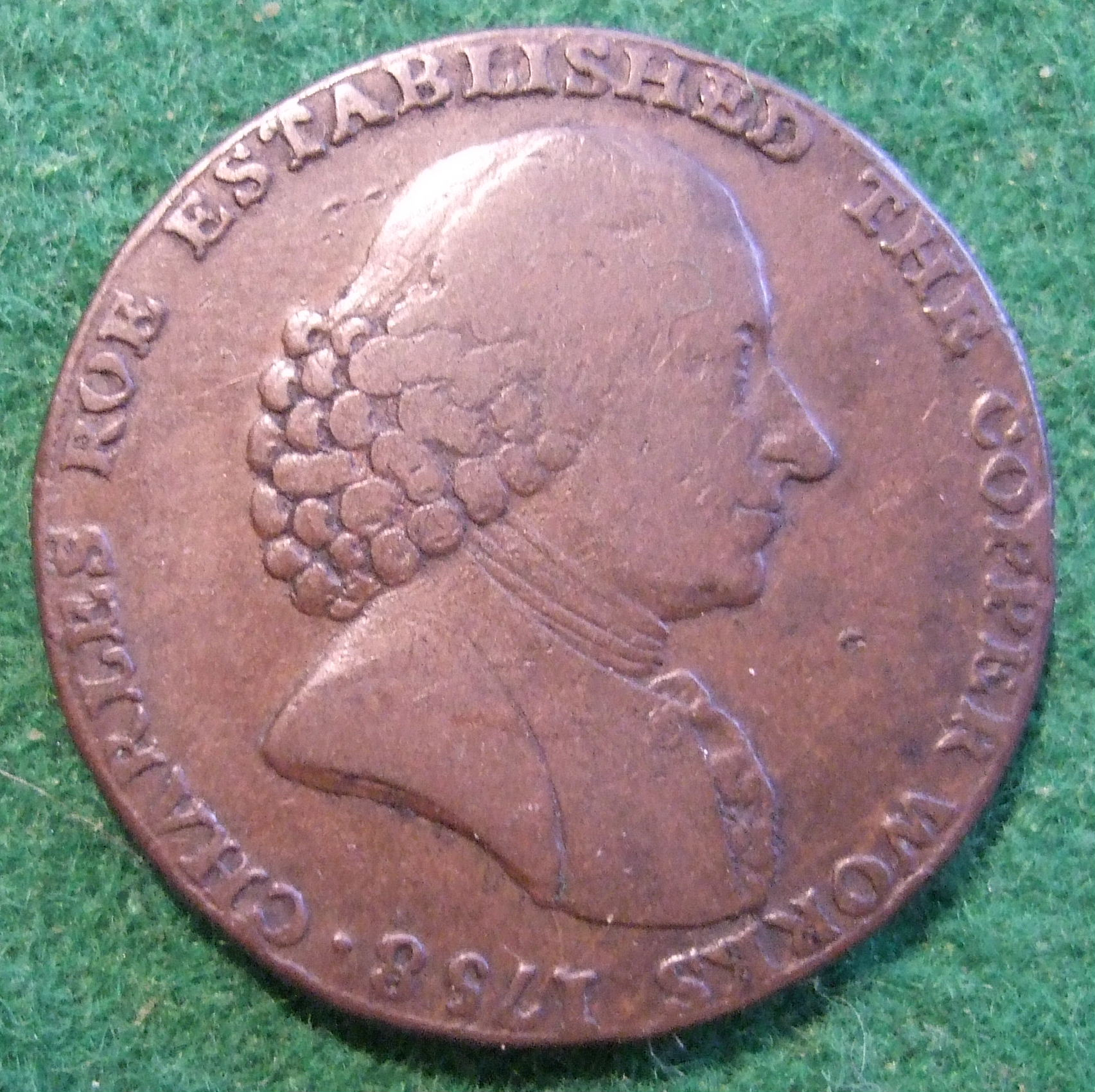
- Profile of Charles Roe on a Macclesfield halfpenny dated 1758
- Born: 7 May 1715; Castleton, Derbyshire, England
- Died: 3 May 1781 (aged 65); Macclesfield, Cheshire
- Resting place: Christ Church, Macclesfield
- Education: Macclesfield Grammar School
- Occupation: Industrialist
- Known for: Silk manufacture, mining, copper and brass smelting
- Spouse(s): Elizabeth Lankford (1743–50); Mary Stockdale (1752–63); Rachel Harriott (1766–81)
- Parent(s): Rev Thomas Roe; Mary Turner

Charles Roe (7 May 1715 – 3 May 1781) was an English industrialist. He played an important part in establishing the silk industry in Macclesfield, Cheshire and later became involved in the mining and metal industries.

== Early life and career ==
Charles Roe was born in Castleton, Derbyshire, the youngest of the eight children of Rev Thomas Roe, vicar of Castleton, and his wife Mary née Turner. His father died when he was aged eight and the family moved to Stockport, Cheshire. Soon after this his mother also died and Charles went to live with siblings in Macclesfield. According to the Oxford Dictionary of National Biography, it is thought that he was educated at Macclesfield Grammar School. He then entered the button and twist trade and became a freeman of Macclesfield in 1742. In 1743–44 he built a small spinning mill on Park Green and in 1748, in partnership with Glover & Co., a larger mill for the production of silk on Waters Green: both were based on Lombe's Mill in Derby. Roe was mayor of Macclesfield in 1747–48.

== Mining and the metal industry ==
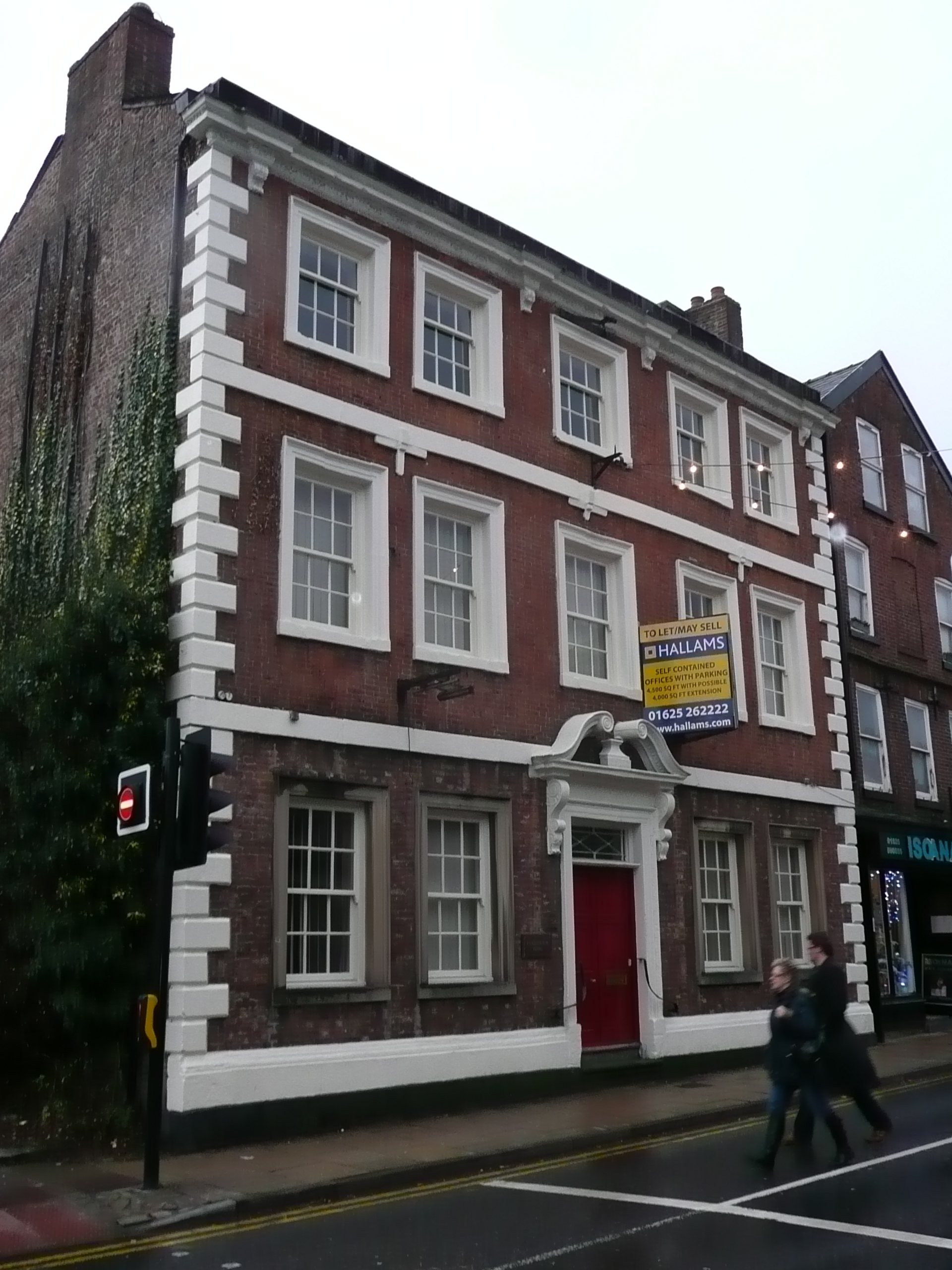
Charles Roe House

He started mining copper at Coniston in the Lake District in 1756 and around the same time at Alderley Edge, Cheshire. In 1758 he built a copper smelter on Macclesfield Common using coal from a shallow outcrop outside the town. He entered into partnership with Brian Hodgson of Buxton, who had coal-mining interests at Disley. Roe then built brass-wire and rolling mills at Eaton near Congleton and at Bosley. Initially he bought copper ores from the Duke of Devonshire's mine at Ecton Hill, Staffordshire (see also Ecton Mines) but then extended his own mining interests to Penrhyn-Du in North Wales in 1763. In 1764 he obtained a 21-year mining lease from the Bayly family for Parys Mountain in Anglesey and for a lead mine in Caernarvonshire. In March 1768 a discovery was made of a very large deposit of copper ore, which was known as 'The Great Lode' and which turned the mine into the largest copper mine in Europe.

In 1767 Roe & Co. built a copper smelter on Liverpool's south shore but following complaints about pollution the works was moved to Toxteth Park. The company later obtained possession of a colliery at Wrexham. Both ore and coal were landed at a small purpose built dock below the copper smelting works on Wellington Road, Toxteth. Roe ceased mining at Alderley Edge in 1768 and at Coniston in 1770. In 1774 the Macclesfield Copper Company was formed comprising Roe and 14 other partners. It became one of the three greatest brass companies of the late 18th century. The Company's records are held by the John Rylands Library, Manchester.

== Personal life ==
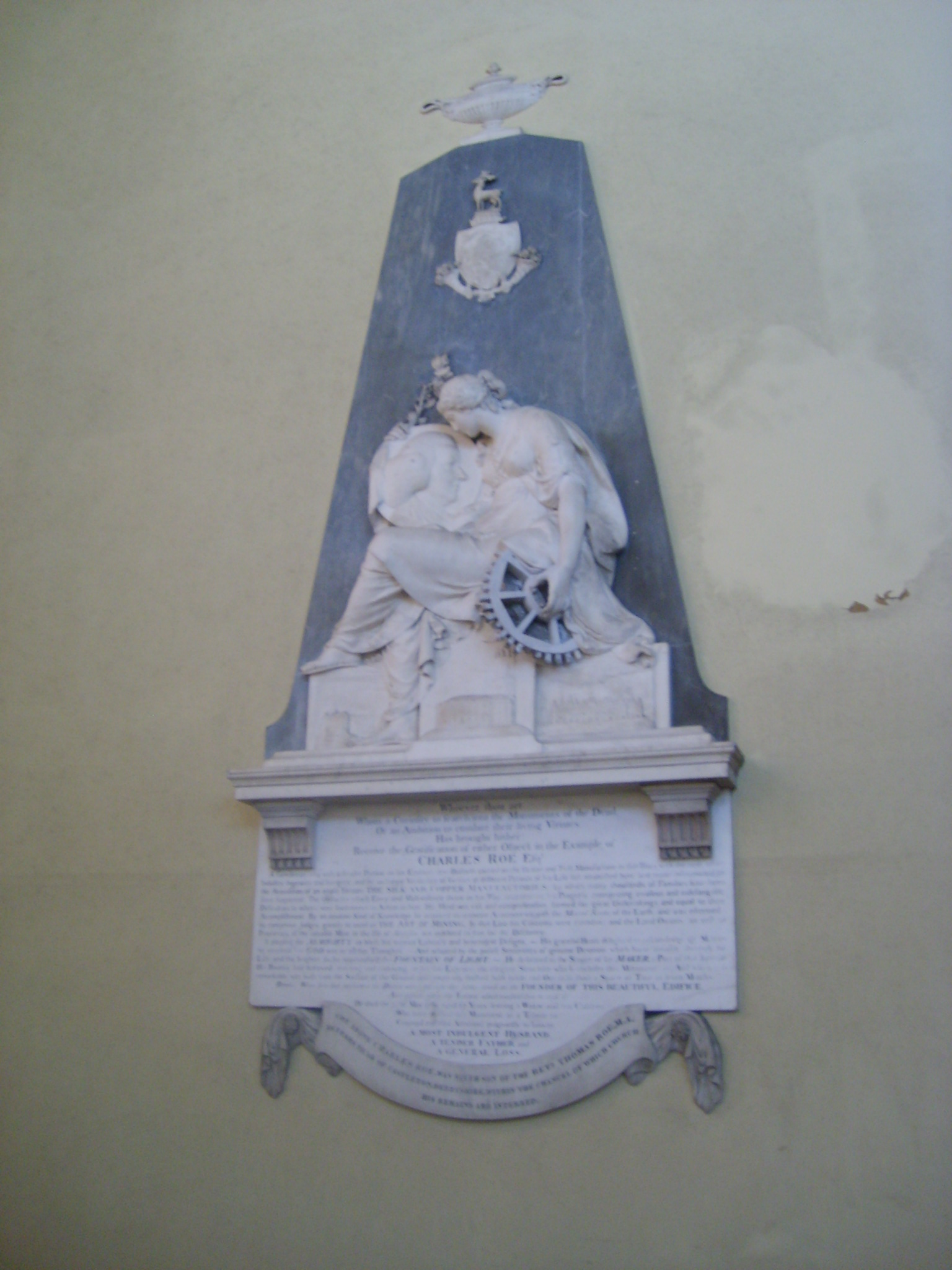
Monument to Charles Roe in Christ Church, Macclesfield

In 1743 Roe married Elizabeth Lankford, daughter of a button merchant of Leek, with whom he had three children who survived infancy. Elizabeth died in 1750 and Roe then married Mary Stockdale in 1752 with whom he had eight children. Mary died in 1763 and Roe married Rachel Harriott in 1766, with whom he had one son.

Charles Roe was an evangelical Christian. He invited Rev David Simpson to Macclesfield and built Christ Church for him to undertake his ministry. Roe was buried in the family vault in Christ Church. A memorial by John Bacon to his memory is on the south wall of the church.

== Legacy ==
Charles Roe lived from 1753 until his death in 1781 in Charles Roe House in Macclesfield on Chestergate (SK11 6DY). This is a Grade II* Listed building which was fully restored in 2017. The Silk Museum Heritage Centre is in Roe Street, Macclesfield, the street being named after Charles Roe. West Park Museum, Macclesfield, contains a display about his life.

== Bibliography ==
- Bentley Smith, Dorothy (2005), A Georgian Gent & Co: The life & times of Charles Roe, Ashbourne, Derbyshire: Landmark Publishing Ltd.
- Chalonor, W. H. (1953), Charles Roe of Macclesfield (1715-81), Trans. Lancs. and Ches. Antqn. Soc. vols. 62 & 63
- Stanley, Louisa D. (1969), Alderley Edge and its Neighbourhood, Didsbury, Manchester: E J Morten, pp. 33–37, copy of 1843 edition by Swinnerton, Macclesfield
