= Listed buildings in Scorton, North Yorkshire =

Scorton is a civil parish in the county of North Yorkshire, England. It contains 20 listed buildings that are recorded in the National Heritage List for England. All the listed buildings are designated at Grade II, the lowest of the three grades, which is applied to "buildings of national importance and special interest". The parish contains the village of Scorton and the surrounding area. Apart from a bridge, all the listed buildings are in the village. These consist of houses and associated structures, a school and a former convent.

== Buildings ==
Name and location	Photograph	Date	Notes
Greencroft; 54.39689°N 1.61434°W		Early 18th century	The house is rendered, with stepped eaves and a pantile roof. There are three storeys and three bays. The central doorway has an oblong fanlight, and to its right is a segmental bow window. The other windows on the front are sashes, those on the top floor horizontally sliding with chamfered surrounds, and at the rear are mullioned windows.
Holly House; 54.39691°N 1.61423°W	—	Early 18th century	The house is in stone, with chamfered rusticated quoins on the right, and a pantile roof with stone coping and shaped kneelers. There are three storeys and three bays. In the centre is a doorway with a fluted surround and a three-pane fanlight. This is flanked by canted bay windows, and the upper floors contain sash windows.
School House; 54.39685°N 1.61466°W	—	Early 18th century	Originally a schoolmaster's house, and later used for other purposes, it is roughcast, and has a stone slate roof with stone coping and shaped kneelers. There are three storeys and seven bays. The doorway has a chamfered surround and a pediment on brackets. The windows are sashes in stone surrounds, there is one blind window, and at the rear is a stair window.
Swale View; 54.39688°N 1.61446°W		Early 18th century	The house is rendered, with chamfered rusticated quoins on the left, stepped eaves, and a pantile roof with stone coping and a shaped kneeler on the left. There are three storeys, three bays and a doorway in the adjacent house to the right. The doorway has fluted pilasters, a decorative oblong fanlight a fluted frieze and a small cornice. The windows are sashes, those on the ground floor with chamfered surrounds, those on the middle floor with architraves and moulded sills, and those on the top floor are horizontally sliding with chamfered surrounds.
Gate piers, Swale View; 54.39675°N 1.61430°W	—	Early 18th century	The gate piers are in stone with a square plan. They have chamfered rustication and chamfered bases. Each pier has a cornice, a blocking course, and an ogee base for an absent finial.
Old Rectory; 54.39523°N 1.61575°W	—	Early to mid-18th century	A house and a cottage combined into one house, it is in brick with a cornice, and a tile roof with stone copings and shaped kneelers. There are two storeys, the house has three bays, the cottage to the left is lower with one bay, and further to the left is a lean-to. The doorway in the centre of the house has a stone surround, and the windows are sashes, those on the ground floor of the house tripartite.
Tees Croft; 54.39549°N 1.61455°W		Early to mid-18th century	The house is in brick, with wrought iron gutter brackets, and a Welsh slate roof with stone copings and shaped kneelers. There are three storeys and three bays, and a two-storey rear wing on the right. The central doorway has a decorative fanlight, and the windows are sashes in architraves. The top floor contains half-size blind windows, painted as sashes, and all the openings, including these, have keystones.
Clara Manor; 54.39537°N 1.61469°W	—	Mid-18th century	The house is in brick, with sandstone dressings, chamfered rusticated quoins, and a pantile roof with stone slates at the eaves, and stone copings and shaped kneelers. There are two storeys and three bays. The central doorway has a four-pane fanlight and a pediment. The windows are sashes in architraves, with flat brick arches and keystones.
Manor House; 54.39618°N 1.61305°W	—	Mid-18th century	The house is in stone, with brick dressings, quoins, and a pantile roof with stone slates at the eaves, and stone copings and shaped kneelers. There are two storeys, four bays, and a lower bay on the right. The doorway has a decorative fanlight, and the windows are sashes in architraves.
Mill House; 54.39667°N 1.61551°W		Mid-18th century	A house and a corn mill to the left combined into one house, it is roughcast with a pantile roof on the left part and a tile roof on the right, with stone coping and shaped kneelers. There are two storeys, and each part has two bays. The left part contains a doorway and sash windows, and between the upper floor windows is a panel with a sundial and the name of the house. The right part contains a central doorway and sash windows, all with stone surrounds and keystones.
Packhorse Bridge; 54.40867°N 1.61450°W	—	18th century (possible)	The bridge is in sandstone, and consists of a single segmental arch without parapets.
Rose Cottage and railings 54.39718°N 1.61317°W	—	Mid-18th century	The house is roughcast, and has a pantile roof with stone copings. There are two storeys and three bays. The doorway has an architrave and a pediment, and the windows are casements. In front of the house is a low stone wall with saddleback coping and plain wrought iron railings.
Former Royal Hotel; 54.39669°N 1.61506°W	—	Mid-18th century	The house, at one time an inn, is roughcast and has a pantile roof with stone coping and shaped kneelers. There are two storeys and four bays. On the front is a doorway with a stone surround, and two canted bay windows. The other windows are sashes, and in front of the house is a three-step mounting block.
Virginia House; 54.39667°N 1.61600°W	—	Mid-18th century	The house is in stone, with quoins, and a pantile roof with stone slates at the eaves, and a raised brick verge and a shaped kneeler on the left. There are two storeys and three bays. The doorway is in the centre, the windows are sashes and all the openings have flat brick arches.
Grammar School; 54.39717°N 1.61507°W		1760	The school is in brick with a hipped pantile roof. There are two storeys, a double depth plan and five bays. The doorway has an eared architrave and a fanlight, and the windows are round-arched sashes with keystones. The upper floor bays are divided by pilasters that rise to the parapet. In the centre is a pediment containing an oculus with keystones containing a coat of arms. On the roof is a clock tower, and an octagonal wooden cupola with a lead roof and a weathervane.
Rose Villa; 54.39781°N 1.61295°W	—	Late 18th century	A house with a school to the right, later two houses, they are in brick, each with a cornice and pantile roofs. Both have two storeys and two bays. The left house is older and has a central doorway with a fluted frieze, paterae and a cornice. The right house dates from the 19th century, it is taller, and its doorway has a two-pane fanlight. The windows in both houses are sashes.
Gate piers south of southwest corner of School House; 54.39682°N 1.61476°W	—	Late 18th to early 19th century	The gate piers are in sandstone. They have a square plan, with rusticated bands on chamfered bases. Each pier has a cornice and a coved cap.
Gate piers south of School House; 54.39674°N 1.61477°W	—	Late 18th to early 19th century	The gate piers are in stone. They have a square plan on simple bases, and each pier has a plain cornice, an ogee-section cap and a ball finial.
The Lodge; 54.39708°N 1.61363°W	—	Late 18th to early 19th century	The house is in roughcast brick, with cogged eaves, and a Welsh slate roof with stone coping and shaped kneelers. There are two storeys, a double depth plan, four bays, and flanking lean-to pavilions. The doorway has a fluted frieze, paterae, and a cornice, and the windows are sashes.
St Clare's Building, St John of God Hospital; 54.39699°N 1.61300°W		c. 1845 (or earlier)	A convent, later used for other purposes, in brick with stone dressings, and a Welsh slate roof with stone copings and shaped kneelers. There are two storeys and attics, and an irregular L-shaped plan, with fronts of three bays. The doorway has a Tudor arch, and most of the windows are mullioned or mullioned and transomed. One of the gables contains a niche with a pointed arch and a statue.
