= Listed buildings in Kiplin =

Kiplin is a civil parish in the county of North Yorkshire, England. It contains ten listed buildings that are recorded in the National Heritage List for England. Of these, one is listed at Grade I, the highest of the three grades, and the others are at Grade II, the lowest grade. The most important building in the parish is Kiplin Hall, which is listed, and most of the other listed buildings are associated with it. Apart from these, there are two listed farmhouses.

== Key ==
Grade	Criteria
I	Buildings of exceptional interest, sometimes considered to be internationally important
II	Buildings of national importance and special interest

== Buildings ==
Name and location	Photograph	Date	Notes	Grade
Kiplin Hall; 54.37208°N 1.57903°W		1625	A country house, to which the library was added in 1818, it is in red brick with diapering, stone dressings, quoins, and a Westmorland slate roof. There are three storeys and a rectangular plan, with a central two-bay tower on each side, and flanking three-bay gabled blocks. The entrance front has a central doorway flanked by paired attached Tuscan columns, a frieze and a cornice, above which is a coat of arms. In the upper floors, each tower has cross windows with continuous hood moulds, a band, a parapet containing a small window, and an ogee lead roof with a ball finial. The windows in the flanking blocks are similar, and the gables are coped with raised verges and finials. The library, on the left, has one storey and five bays.	I
Kiplin Farmhouse; 54.36850°N 1.57043°W	—	Late 17th to early 18th century	The farmhouse is in stone, with brick quoins and a floor band, stepped eaves, and a roof of tile and pantile with stone coping. There are two storeys, five bays, and flanking single-storey single-bay wings. The doorway has a quoined surround and a keystone, and the windows are sashes in the main block and casements in the wings.	II
Cow byre west of Kiplin Hall; 54.37098°N 1.58519°W		Mid 18th century	The building is in stone, with a band and an embattled parapet, and is in Gothick style. There is a single storey and three bays, the middle bay projecting slightly. In the middle bay is a doorway and the outer bays contain windows, all with pointed arches. In the upper part of each bay is a quatrefoil, and on the sides are cross-shaped blank arrow holes.	II
Servants' wing north of Kiplin Hall; 54.37238°N 1.57902°W	—	18th century	The building is in red brick on a chamfered plinth, with stone dressings, quoins, and a stone slate roof with raised verges, stone coping and shaped kneelers. There are two storeys and three bays. The doorways are on the sides, there is one tripartite window, and the other windows are sashes, all with stone surrounds and keystones.	II
Outbuilding north of Kiplin Hall; 54.37478°N 1.58014°W	—	Mid to late 18th century	The outbuilding is in stone with a gabled front, and has a band, a coped pediment and a pantile roof, and is in Palladian style. There are two storeys and one bay, and a square plan. In the centre is a recessed ached panel containing a doorway, with a lunette above.	II
East lodge and gateway, Kiplin Hall; 54.37081°N 1.56928°W		Late 18th century	The lodge, designed by W. E. Nesfield, was added in about 1870. It is in stone on a plinth, with quoins, and a stone slate roof with stone coping and finials. There are two storeys, a T-shaped plan, with three bays and a rear wing. In the left return is a porch, and most of the windows are mullioned with hood moulds. The gate piers are rusticated on chamfered plinths, and each has an entablature with paterae and a stepped cap. The gate and the railings are in wrought iron and have leak motif finials.	II
Northwest lodge and gateway, Kiplin Hall; 54.37488°N 1.58299°W	—	Late 18th century	The lodge is in stone with a stone slate roof, and has a two-story central bay and flanking slightly recessed single-storey bays. In the centre is a tripartite window with an impost band continuing as a cornice over the outer bays, and above is a sash window, a cornice and a pediment. The outer bays contain round-headed windows with voussoirs, end pilasters and stone coping. The carriage and pedestrian gates are in wrought iron, and the gate piers are rusticated on plinths, each with an entablature and paterae, a cornice and a stepped cap.	II
Stanhowe Farmhouse; 54.37690°N 1.54669°W	—	c. 1850	The farmhouse is in red brick, and has a pantile roof with stone coping and shaped kneelers. There are two storeys, three bays and a rear wing. The doorway is in the centre, and the windows are sashes with flat brick arches.	II
Fruit store and coach house north of Kiplin Hall; 54.37327°N 1.57927°W	—	c. 1870	The building, designed by W. E. Nesfield, is in stone with brick bands, and stone slate roofs with raised verges, stone coping and kneelers. There is one storey and attics, and an L-shaped plan. The coach house contains casement windows under segmental brick arches, and a slit vent. The fruit store has ten buttresses, casement windows, and a canted dormer with a hipped roof. To the right is an external staircase under a verandah.	II
Gatepiers, gates and railings east of Kiplin Hall; 54.37224°N 1.57849°W		c. 1880	The gateway was designed by W. E. Nesfield, and the gates are in wrought iron with scroll and floral motifs and finials. They are flanked by piers in vermiculated rusticated stone with red brick banding on plinths. Each pier has a cornice, a coat of arms, a frieze, and a scrolled pediment with a finial. Outside these are brick walls with stone coping, containing intermediate and end piers with bands, friezes, cornices and ball finials.	II
