= Scorton Feast =

English tradition

Scorton Feast is an annual event held at Scorton, North Yorkshire, England. Many activities are held on the raised village green, although there are currently several other key sites including Beck Green and the Archery field, the Gymkhana/Harness Racing field off Banks Lane, and the Flower Show tent on Bolton Road.

== History ==
It is believed that Scorton Feast was first held in AD 1257 and it celebrated its 750th anniversary in 2006. The Feast has not, however, been held continuously over those 750 years.

The Feast is usually celebrated around August the 15th, which is the Festival of the Blessed Virgin Mary. The Feast is currently held over four days and commences on the third Sunday in August and ends on the following Wednesday.

== Activities ==
The activities at Scorton Feast include (2013 event):

Sunday

- Open Clay Shoot
- Lads & Dads Cricket
- Challenge Cricket Match - Presidents XI v Scorton Feast XI
- Parish Quoits Competition
- Supa Relay Race
- The Company of Scorton Archers
- Reeth Brass Band
- Evening Service
- BBQ & Live Music

Monday

- Junior Football Matches
- Children's Sports
- Gymkhana
- Children's Garden Party
- Children's Entertainment
- Harness Racing
- Five-a-Side Football Competition
- Bowls Competition

Tuesday

- Girl's Rounders
- Children's Competitions
- Flower, Vegetable and Produce Show
- Ladies Cricket Match
- 5 Mile Parish Cycle Race
- Scootering Demonstration
- Welly Throwing
- Old Tyme & Modern Sequence Dancing

Wednesday

- Kwik Cricket Match
- Children's Pet Show
- Fancy Dress Parade
- Adult Sports
- Open Air Concert

There is also a Scorton Arrow Hunt held Monday, Tuesday and Wednesday and a Funfair held on the evenings of all days except the Sunday.

Local folklore has it that the end of Scorton Feast coincides with the end of summer.
