= David Simpson (priest) =

English Anglican priest

Rev David Simpson
- Born: 12 October 1745; Ingleby Arncliffe, Northallerton, Yorkshire, England
- Died: 24 March 1799 (aged 53); Macclesfield, Cheshire
- Education: Scorton Grammar School; St John's College, Cambridge
- Occupation: Clergyman
- Title: Reverend
- Spouses: Ann Yaldy; Elizabeth Davy
- Parent: Ralph Simpson

Rev David Simpson, M.A. (12 October 1745 – 24 March 1799) was an Anglican priest who spent most of his career in Macclesfield, Cheshire, England.

== Early life and education ==
David Simpson was born at Ingleby Arncliffe, near Northallerton, Yorkshire, the son of Ralph Simpson, a farmer. He was expected to follow his father's occupation but as a boy received a calling to the ministry. He was educated at Scorton Grammar School and then at St John's College, Cambridge, where he graduated B.A in 1769 and M.A. in 1772. His theology was evangelical and this was to cause problems during his career. As an undergraduate he became a friend of Rowland Hill, and he was also a close friend of John Wesley, the founder of Methodism.

== Career ==
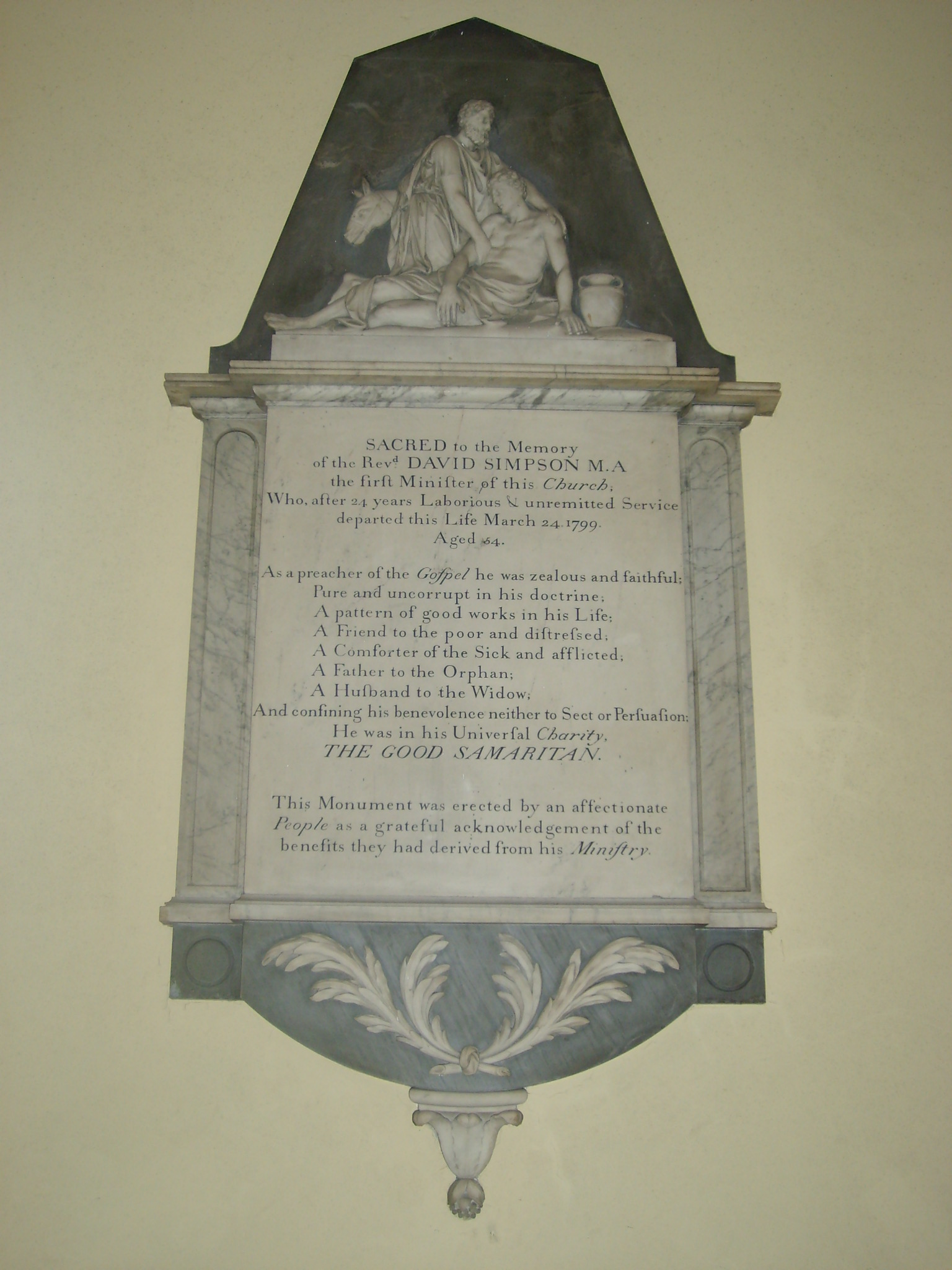
Monument to David Simpson in Christ Church, Macclesfield

In September 1769 Simpson was ordained deacon and worked as a curate in Ramsden Bellhouse, Essex. In 1771 he was ordained priest and became curate at Buckingham. However he was forced to leave this position within one year because of his evangelical preaching. He was invited to move to Macclesfield by Charles Roe, a local evangelical industrialist, and was appointed assistant curate at St Michael's Church. His subsequent promotion to prime curacy was opposed by a group of parishioners, and Roe built a new church for him, Christ Church. Simpson was licensed in 1779 and he continued as minister of this church until his death in 1799.

As a result of his friendship with John Wesley, Wesley was invited to preach at Christ Church on at least 12 occasions, which was unusual for an Anglican church. In addition to his ministry at Christ Church he was also an itinerant preacher locally. He founded friendly societies, charity schools and Sunday schools and attracted large congregations. He was a pioneer of congregational hymn-singing and published a collection of hymns in 1776. He was a prolific author, publishing over 30 works, which included sermons, tracts, essays, and volumes of apologetic. Some of his collected writings are held in the library of St John's College, Cambridge.

== Personal life ==
Simpson married Ann Yaldy in May 1773 but she died 15 months later, leaving a daughter. He then married Elizabeth Davy in 1776; they had three children. He died on Easter Sunday 1799 and was buried two days later at Christ Church.
