= Great Langton =

Village and civil parish in North Yorkshire, England

Coordinates: 54°21′46″N 1°32′49″W

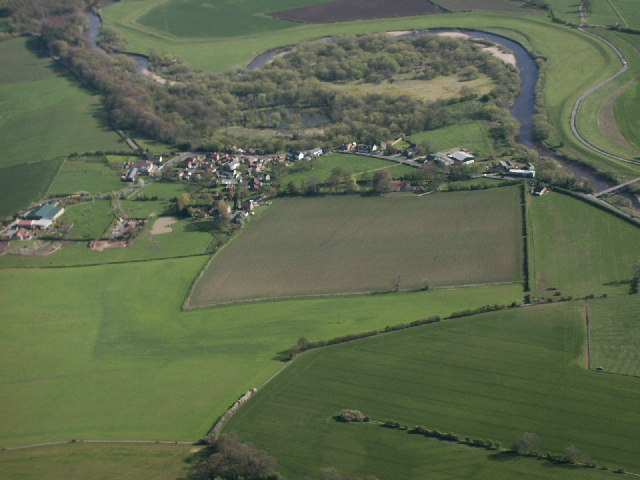
- Aerial view of Great Langton and the River Swale

- Location within North Yorkshire
- Area: 3.04 km^{2} (1.17 sq mi)
- Population: 202 (Including Kiplin and Whitwell. 2011 Census)
  - Density: 66/km^{2} (170/sq mi)
- OS grid reference: SE295964
- Civil parish: Great Langton
- Unitary authority: North Yorkshire
- Ceremonial county: North Yorkshire
- Region: Yorkshire and the Humber
- Country: England
- Sovereign state: United Kingdom
- Post town: NORTHALLERTON
- Postcode district: DL7
- Dialling code: 01609
- Police: North Yorkshire
- Fire: North Yorkshire
- Ambulance: Yorkshire
- UK Parliament: Richmond and Northallerton

Great Langton is a small village and civil parish in North Yorkshire, England. The village lies on the B6271 road, between Scorton and Northallerton, on the northern bank of the River Swale and it was once known as Langton-upon-Swale.

From 1974 to 2023 it was part of the Hambleton District, it is now administered by the unitary North Yorkshire Council.

The village church is St Wilfrid's Church, Great Langton; there used to be also the Chapel of the Good Shepherd, which has now been converted into a residential property. There was once a school in Great Langton but it also closed and is now a residential property. The village pub, which was known as The Langton Hotel until it changed its name to The Wishing Well in the 1970s, closed in 2004.

The village is a short distance from Kiplin Hall, the stately home built by George Calvert, 1st Baron Baltimore, the founder of Maryland.

== Etymology ==
The name 'Great Langton' derives from Old English meaning ‘Long farm/settlement’. ‘Lang’ is the old Saxon word for ‘long’, and ‘Tun’ being ‘town’. It is known as Great Langton because there is a Little Langton nearby.

== Sites of interest ==
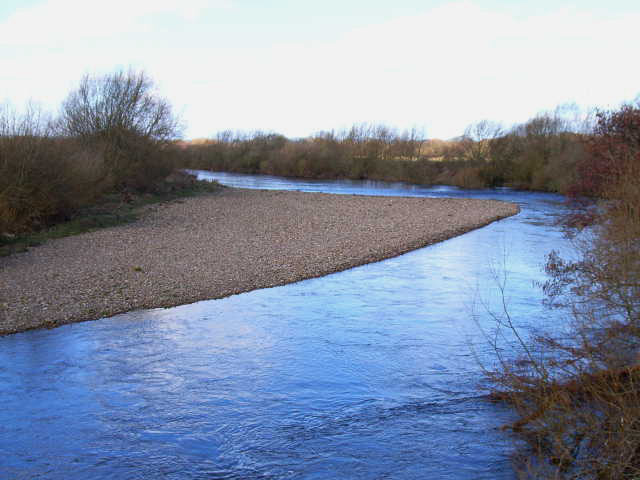
River Swale from Great Langton Bridge

Great Langton has a small number of Sites of Importance for Nature Conservation. These include Great Langton Pond located in grid reference SE289959, Poole's Waist at SE306943, River Swale at SE257966 and Winterwalk Wood at SE302955, in close vicinity to Little Langton.

Great Langton Pond has many ornithological (wetland) purposes as well as plenty of decent angling. The pond is known to contain species such as Tench, Bream and Pike.

The River Swale has been known to be subject to flooding and is monitored closely by the Environment Agency. Although Great Langton is located in a primary area for fishing, no local residents are in the trade. The River Swale also attracts large numbers of duck into the village, commonly seen around winter. The ducks tend to arrive around mid-September having travelled around 2,000 miles (3,200 km) from central CIS. They return around April, the journey taking several weeks.

Poole's Waist is one of many oxbow lakes located on the River Swale. River water still floods through Poole's Waist during periods of high rainfall.

== History ==
Great Langton shows signs of human activity throughout much of its postglacial history. Initially, in the late-glacial and early Holocene (Mesolithic) period, there is little sign of any human impacts on the landscape, but there are signs of forest fires shown by fire climax vegetation, which could have been prevalent as a result of Mesolithic activity. Farming began only in the mid Holocene period, so human activity is likely to have been far larger from then onwards. Farming would have greatly increased and caused significant changes in the fluvial sediment regime through woodland clearance and colluvial hillwash.

Therefore, Great Langton shows signs of rural activity. Also, there are signs of quarrying since there is a disused quarry located on part of the old river bed. Hence, the Swale is seen to have high sand and gravel content.

Great Langton first became a parish in 1823.

== Religion ==
The 2001 census for the parish of Great Langton reveals that 83% of the inhabitants are Christian, with only 10.8% stating that they have 'no religion'. The remaining 6.2% did not wish to say. Every year, Great Langton holds a church fete to raise money for St Wilfrid's Church.

== Economy ==
The 2001 census for the parish shows that around 38.9% of the occupants are employed in 'small roles' at work. Agriculture takes up 28% of the occupants' jobs, the highest employer followed by 'wholesale and retail' at 22%. Every household in the village owns at least one car. 40% of households are 'owned outright', with only 17.6% being rented. Only 2.75% of occupants are registered as unemployed. 30.3% have a higher qualification, 21.4% have none. 11% of houses in Great Langton do not have central heating.

== Transport ==
Only 3% of Great Langton's population use public transport to travel to work. There are, however, bus links which go to Richmond, Yafforth and Northallerton. There are regular train services between Northallerton and London that allow for a relatively easy connection.

== Climate ==
According to the Köppen classification the British Isles experience a maritime climate characterised by relatively cool summers and mild winters. Compared with other parts of the country, North Yorkshire is slightly warmer and sunnier in the summer and colder and frostier in the winter. Owing to its inland position, and sheltered by the Pennines to the west, North Yorkshire is one of the driest counties in the UK, receiving, on average, less than 600 mm (24 in) of rain per year. The mean annual daily duration of bright sunshine is three hours and 42 minutes.

There are two distinct local weather phenomenon, marked downslope lee winds caused by the proximity of the Pennines, leading to super geostrophic winds which can reach in excess of 70 mph, most commonly in winter and spring. In the winter, the presence of a subsidence inversion between the Pennines and the North York Moors can allow dense, persistent fog to form that can last for several days.

Climate data for Leeming (North Yorkshire): Average maximum and minimum temperatures, and average rainfall recorded between 1991 and 2020 by the Met Office.elevation: 32 m (105 ft)
Month	Jan	Feb	Mar	Apr	May	Jun	Jul	Aug	Sep	Oct	Nov	Dec	Year
Mean daily maximum °C (°F)	7.0 (44.6)	7.8 (46.0)	10.2 (50.4)	13.0 (55.4)	16.0 (60.8)	18.7 (65.7)	21.0 (69.8)	20.5 (68.9)	17.9 (64.2)	13.9 (57.0)	9.9 (49.8)	7.2 (45.0)	13.6 (56.5)
Mean daily minimum °C (°F)	1.1 (34.0)	1.1 (34.0)	2.2 (36.0)	3.9 (39.0)	6.5 (43.7)	9.6 (49.3)	11.6 (52.9)	11.4 (52.5)	9.3 (48.7)	6.5 (43.7)	3.4 (38.1)	1.0 (33.8)	5.65 (42.17)
Average precipitation mm (inches)	53.8 (2.12)	44.0 (1.73)	39.4 (1.55)	46.2 (1.82)	43.8 (1.72)	58.8 (2.31)	56.2 (2.21)	65.3 (2.57)	56.9 (2.24)	65.0 (2.56)	64.8 (2.55)	59.5 (2.34)	653.7 (25.74)
Average precipitation days (≥ 1.0 mm)	12.0	10.0	8.5	9.0	8.7	9.4	9.3	10.1	9.1	11.1	12.2	11.9	121.4
Mean monthly sunshine hours	58.1	81.7	121.5	153.8	195.0	175.9	185.5	171.2	132.7	93.4	63.7	54.2	1,486.7
Source: Met Office

== See also ==
- Listed buildings in Great Langton
