= Christ Church, Macclesfield =

Coordinates: 53.2586°N 2.1305°W

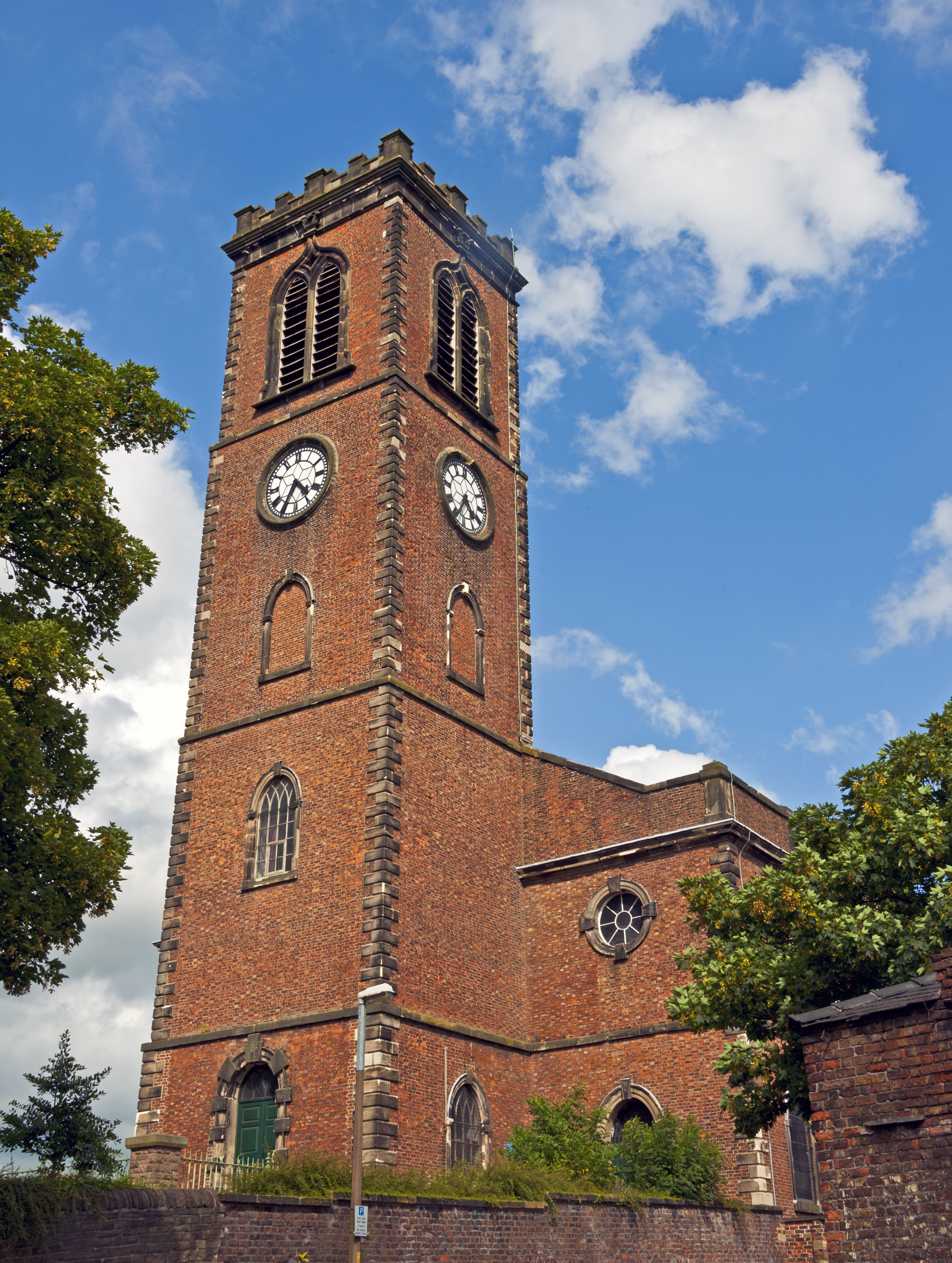
- Church from the southwest, 2014

- Location in Cheshire
- OS grid reference: SJ 9140 7353
- Location: Great King Street, Macclesfield, Cheshire
- Country: England
- Denomination: Anglican
- Website: Churches Conservation Trust

Architecture
- Functional status: Redundant
- Heritage designation: Grade II*
- Designated: 14 April 1949
- Architectural type: Church
- Style: Georgian
- Completed: 1777

Specifications
- Capacity: 1,800
- Materials: Brick with stone dressings Slate roof

Christ Church is a redundant Anglican church in Great King Street, Macclesfield, Cheshire, England. It is recorded in the National Heritage List for England as a designated Grade II* listed building, and is under the care of the Churches Conservation Trust. It is open to visitors at advertised times. The church was in use until 1981. It remains consecrated and is used occasionally for services.

== History ==
In the second half of the 18th century the parish church of Macclesfield, St Michael's was not big enough to cope with the needs of the growing population of the town. In 1772 David Simpson was appointed curate to the church but was deprived of his curacy because of his evangelical beliefs and preaching. Simpson had been invited to Macclesfield by Charles Roe, a local industrialist. Roe built Christ Church for David Simpson, who became its first vicar.

The body of the church was built in seven months in 1775 and the church was opened on Christmas Day of that year. The tower was built the following year. Its height is 107 feet (33 m) which is out of proportion to the body of the church. It was built to this height to compete with the height of the tower of St Michael's Church. The church originally contained a large pulpit. David Simpson was a close friend of John Wesley, the founder of Methodism. Unusually for an Anglican church, Simpson invited Wesley to preach there on at least 12 occasions. Christ Church was vested in the Trust on 1 June 1985.

A local group, The Roe-naissance Project, established in 2012 is working with the Churches Conservation Trust and Cheshire East Council to find a new appropriate and sustainable use for the building.

== Architecture ==
=== Exterior ===
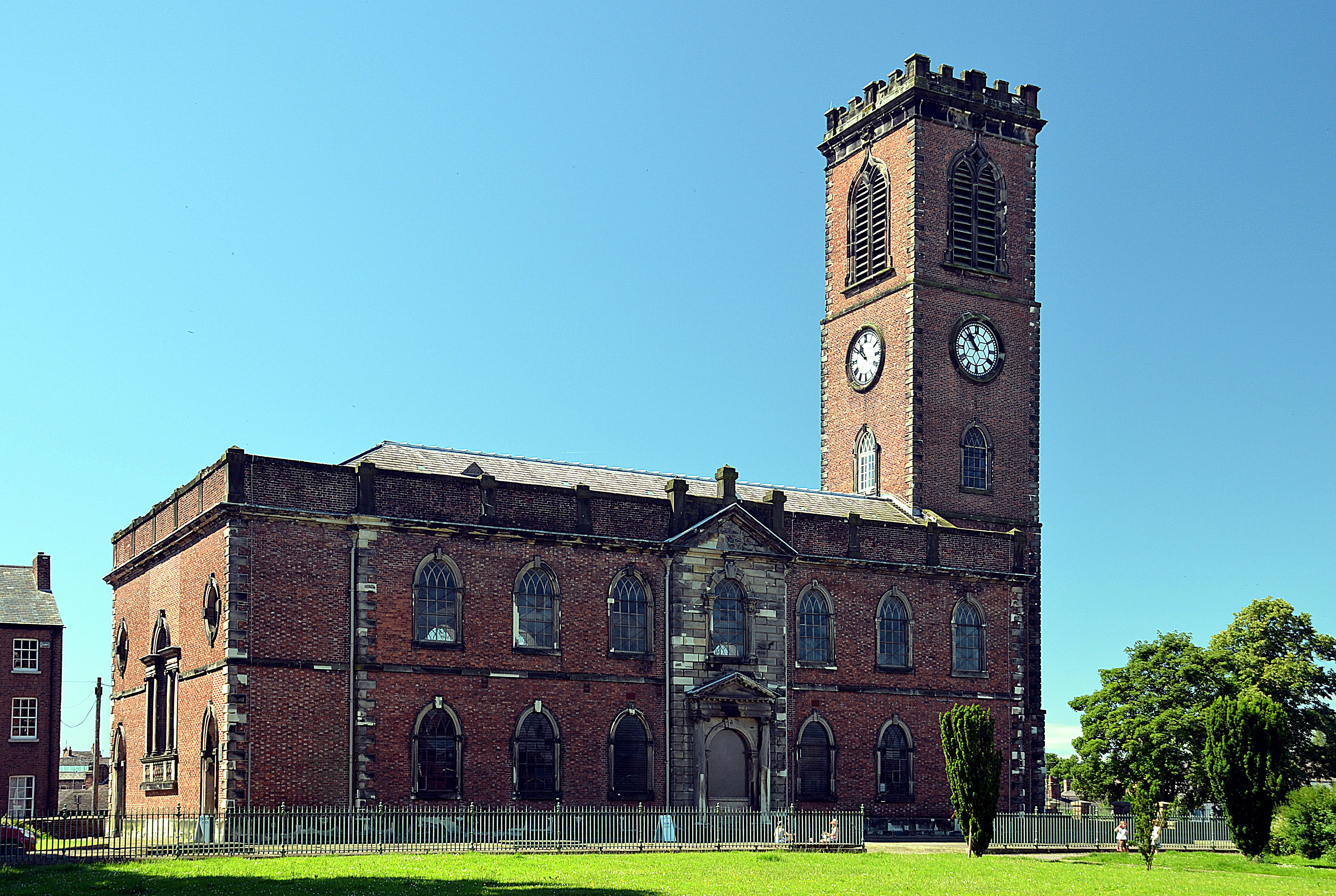
The north elevation of the church

The church is built in brick with stone facings in Georgian style. Its plan consists of a tower at the west end, a nave and a short chancel. The tower has west and north doors. Above the west door is a window with an elliptical head. The third stage contains elliptical windows, some of which are blind, and above these clock faces. The belfry windows are of two lights and louvred. The top has an embattled parapet above a cornice. The exterior of the nave and chancel are expressed as two storeys, with a cornice between. Above is a parapet over another cornice. At the east end is a Palladian window with round windows and doors on each side. In the middle of the north elevation is a door with a pediment above. This is surrounded with rusticated stone extending up to the parapet with another pediment at the top. The parapets of the tower and body of the church were originally surmounted by pinnacles but these are no longer present.

=== Interior ===
Inside the church a continuous gallery curves round the north, west and south sides, which is supported by columns of cast iron which are encased in wood. This is a very early use of cast iron in a church. The organ is in the west gallery. The ceiling is coved with plain plaster panelling. The church contains box pews and a small marble font. The stained glass in the east window is by William Wailes. There is glass in a window on the south side of the church by Morris & Co. On the south wall is a monument to Charles Roe in black and white marble dated 1784 by John Bacon. It is in low relief and carries a bust of Roe, with images of the church, Roe's silk mill and his copper works. Also on the south wall is a monument to David Simpson. The three-manual organ was made by Gray & Davison in 1875. There is a ring of ten bells which are still used regularly. Ten bells were cast in 1777 by Rudhall of Gloucester. In 1815, the two lightest bells were sold, and the 9th was recast by William Dobson of Downham. The tenor bell was recast by Taylors of Loughborough in 1902, and in 1947 they added two trebles to make a ring of ten again. Being a redundant church, there is no ringing for Sunday services, but there is a regular practice on Monday evening (usually 19:00 to 21:15), though it is advisable to enquire, particularly for Bank Holidays.

The three-decker pulpit and choirstalls have been dismantled and put into storage. There are several items of carving from the "Macclesfield School of Carving" within the church. The most notable is a fine Edwardian reredos altar screen. This was dis-assembled during a restoration programme by over enthusiastic conservators to return the look of the Church to its Georgian original.

== See also ==
- Grade II* listed buildings in Cheshire East
- List of churches preserved by the Churches Conservation Trust in Northern England
- Listed buildings in Macclesfield
