= St John of God Hospital, Scorton =

Hospital building in Scorton, North Yorkshire, England

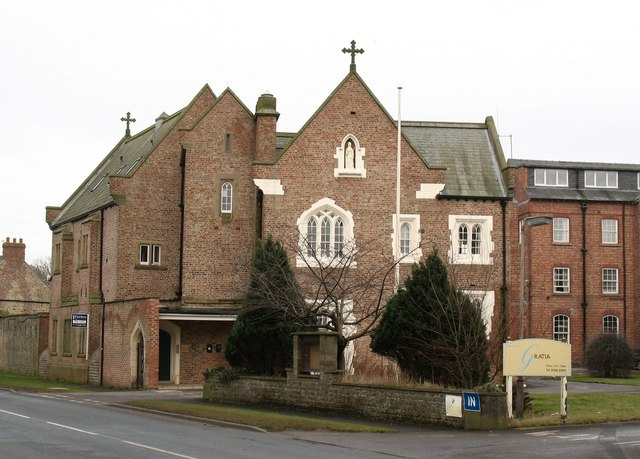
St Clare's Building, in 2009

The St John of God Hospital is a former hospital in Scorton, North Yorkshire, a village in England.

The Poor Clares built a convent in Scorton by 1845. They ran a girls' school, perhaps in the same building. In 1857, the order moved to Darlington, and the building was converted into a care home for the elderly. In 1880, the Order of St John of God took over the building, converting it into a hospital. In 1912, a new block with space for 200 patients was added, with the original block becoming known as "St Clare's Building". The chapel was reordered in the early 1930s, and a 17-bed surgical ward was established in 1950. Other facilities were gradually added, including a library, shop, and in 1955, a swimming pool. In 1970, the hospital for the first time established a ward for women. A rehabilitation unit was built in 1977.

In 2001, the hospital closed its acute services, then left the site entirely in 2002. It was again converted into a care home, but this closed in 2013, and in 2022 it was proposed to convert it into housing.

The original building is constructed of brick with stone dressings, and a Welsh slate roof with stone copings and shaped kneelers. There are two storeys and attics, and an irregular L-shaped plan, with fronts of three bays. The doorway has a Tudor arch, and most of the windows are mullioned or mullioned and transomed. One of the gables contains a niche with a pointed arch and a statue. Ir was grade II listed in 1987.

== See also ==
- Listed buildings in Scorton, North Yorkshire
