= Scorton Arrow =

Archery tournament, established in 1673

The Antient Scorton Silver Arrow is an archery tournament that was incepted on Sunday 14 May 1673 in the village of Scorton in Yorkshire, England. Twenty-two archers competed in the first event for the prize of a silver arrow. This was won by Henry Calverley of Eryholme on Tees, who had provided the trophy. The event proved so successful that a new organisation, the Society of Archers, was formed to hold the event on an annual basis.

Participants shoot at targets at a range of 100 yards. The target face is a standard four-foot (122 cm) five-colour face, with the addition of a three-inch black spot at the centre. The winner is the first person to hit the black spot. The winner is appointed Captain of the Arrow. The first person to hit the red zone is appointed Lieutenant of the Arrow.

The winner is presented with a replica of the original silver arrow, which he keeps for a year. The original silver arrow is held at the Royal Armouries Museum in Leeds.

The event is open to men aged 21 years or over, using hand bows other than compound bows. A similar event for women, the Ascham Silver Arrow, was introduced in 1976.

The event normally takes place annually, but postponements and cancellations have occurred. In the 336 years to 2008, 300 meetings have taken place.

The event has been held at many places in Yorkshire, since the organising of the event for one year is the responsibility of the person who became Captain of the Arrow in the previous year (assisted by the Lieutenant of the Arrow). The first event was held at the village of Scorton in Yorkshire, and the event has returned to Scorton on 14 occasions. The 2008 event, which was the 300th meeting, was also held in Scorton.

The Antient Scorton Silver Arrow claims to be the oldest sporting event still running. Several other sporting events claim to have been running for longer than the Antient Scorton Silver Arrow, notably the Papingo shoot at Kilwinning and the Kiplingcotes Derby Horserace. They may well be correct, but reliable records of these events do not go back as far as those of the Scorton Arrow.
