= Listed buildings in Ellerton-on-Swale =

Ellerton-on-Swale is a civil parish in the county of North Yorkshire, England. It contains three listed buildings that are recorded in the National Heritage List for England. All the listed buildings are designated at Grade II, the lowest of the three grades, which is applied to "buildings of national importance and special interest". The parish contains the village of Ellerton-on-Swale and the surrounding countryside, and the listed buildings consist of two houses and a boundary stone.

== Buildings ==
Name and location	Photograph	Date	Notes
Manor House; 54.37178°N 1.60412°W	—	Late 17th century (probable)	The manor house is on brick, with string courses, a stone slate eaves course, and roofs of pantile, stone slate and Welsh slate with raised brick verges and corbelled brick kneelers. There are three storeys and three bays. The doorway has a fanlight, and to its right is a two-storey segmental bow window. The other windows are sashes, those in the top floor are horizontally-sliding. At the rear is a gabled wing forming a stair turret, with stone coping and shaped kneelers.
Boundary Stone; 54.37510°N 1.58375°W	—	1769	The parish boundary stone is in sandstone, it has a square section and is about 300 millimetres (12 in) high. There are inscriptions on the left and right returns, with the date on the right return.
2 Manor Cottages; 54.37248°N 1.60390°W	—	Late 18th century	The house is in stone, with quoins, and a pantile roof with raised verges. There are two storeys and three bays. The central doorway has a quoined surround and a lintel with a keystone, and the windows are sashes with flat arches.
