= St Wilfrid's Church, Great Langton =

Church in North Yorkshire, England

Coordinates: 54.3600°N 1.5368°W

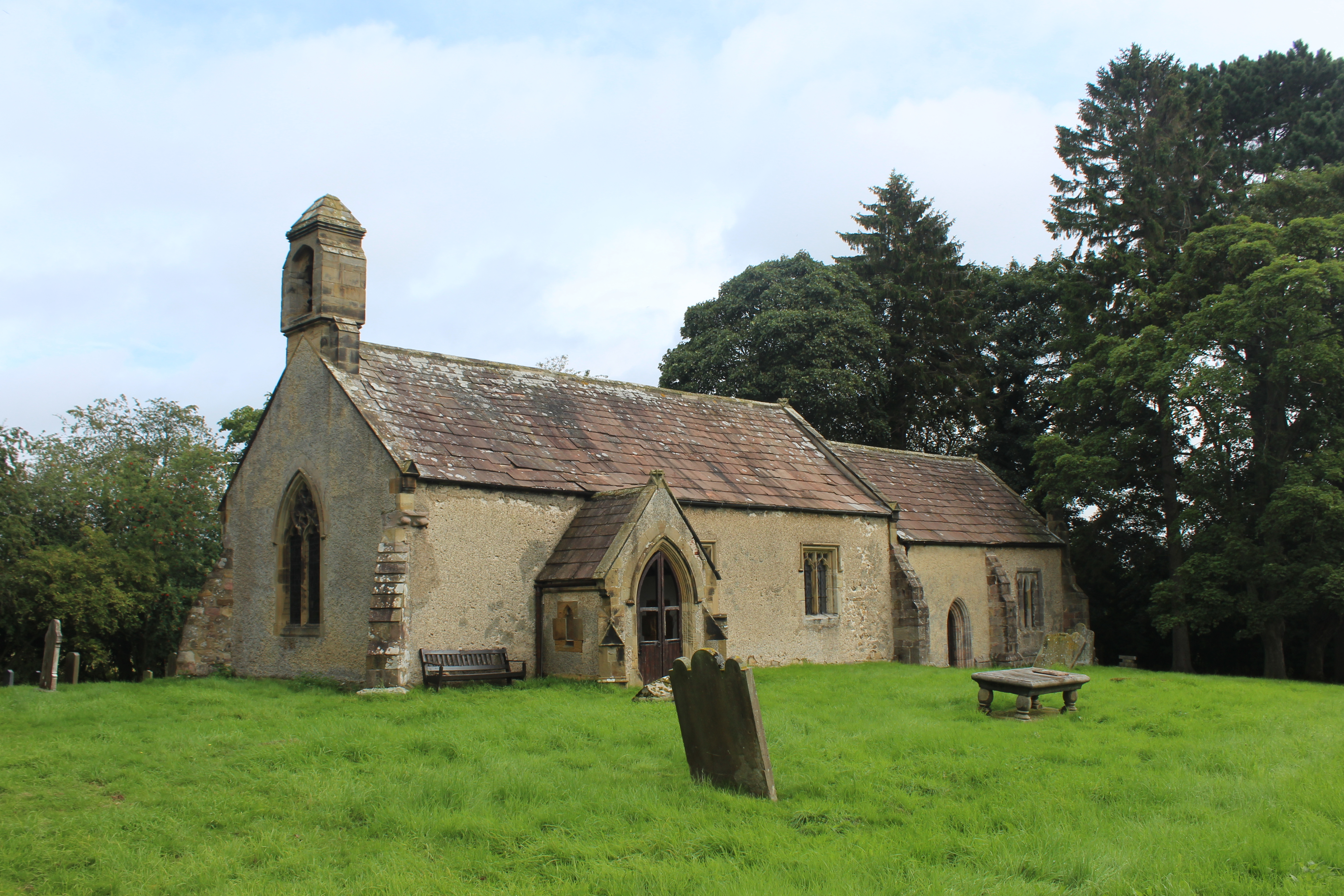
The church, in 2020

St Wilfrid's Church is an Anglican church in Great Langton, a village in North Yorkshire, in England.

The church was built in about 1140, from which period the north and south walls of the nave survive, the south with an original doorway and the north with a doorway probably inserted later in the century. The chancel was rebuilt in the 13th century, and altered in the 14th century. A south porch and north vestry were added in the 19th century, and the central wooden tower was removed and replaced by a bellcote at the west end. The building was grade II listed in 1970.

The church is built of rendered sandstone and has a stone slate roof. The church consists of a nave, a south porch, a chancel and a north vestry, and at the west end is a bellcote. The porch is gabled, and has a doorway with a chamfered surround, a pointed arch and a hood mould The inner doorway is Norman, and has columns with cushion capitals. In the chancel is a priest's door with a pointed arch, and at the east end is an angle buttress surmounted by a pinnacle. Inside, there is a 15th-century effigy of a priest.

== See also ==
- Listed buildings in Great Langton
