= Society of Archers =

Archery organisation

The Society of Archers is an English archery organisation that was formed on Sunday 14 May 1673.

The purpose of the Society is to continue the annual Antient Scorton Silver Arrow tournament and preserve details of its entrants and winners. The Society was formed immediately following the first Antient Scorton Silver Arrow tournament.

Membership is obtained by entering the tournament and agreeing to abide by its rules. Entry to the tournament is restricted to men aged 21 years or over.
