= Ellerton-on-Swale =

Village and civil parish in North Yorkshire, England

Coordinates: 54.3767°N 1.6079°W

- Location within North Yorkshire
- Population: 110
- OS grid reference: SE255979
- Unitary authority: North Yorkshire
- Ceremonial county: North Yorkshire
- Region: Yorkshire and the Humber
- Country: England
- Sovereign state: United Kingdom
- Post town: RICHMOND
- Postcode district: DL10
- Police: North Yorkshire
- Fire: North Yorkshire
- Ambulance: Yorkshire

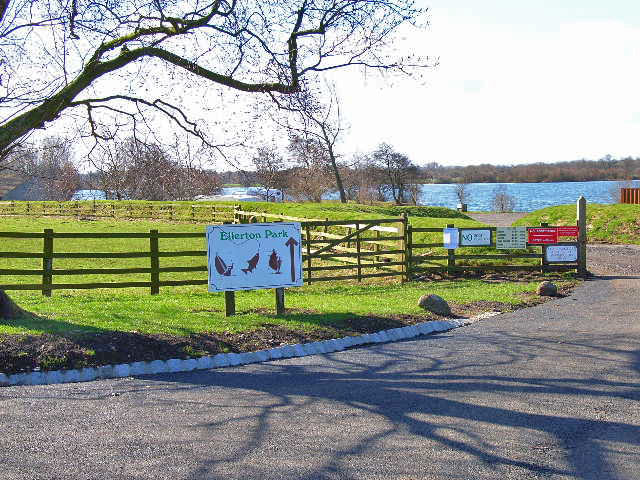
Ellerton Park Leisure Lake

Ellerton-on-Swale or Ellerton (historically known as Ellerton-upon-Swale) is a small village and civil parish about a mile east of Catterick in the county of North Yorkshire, England. In 2015, North Yorkshire County Council estimated the population of the parish at 110.

From 1974 to 2023 it was part of the district of Richmondshire, it is now administered by the unitary North Yorkshire Council.

The village sits just south of the B6271 road between Richmond and Northallerton, and has a large lake used for diving between the settlement and the River Swale to the south. Another lake to the west, Bolton-on-Swale Lake, is a former sand and gravel quarry and is now a Yorkshire Wildlife Trust sponsored nature reserve.

The name Ellerton derives from the Old Norse elri, or the Old English alor, meaning 'alder tree' and the Old English tūn meaning 'settlement'.

The village has an entry in the Domesday Book which states that it belonged to Count Alan and had six villagers. It is said that it is the birthplace of Henry Jenkins, who died in 1670 and is reported to have lived to an incredible age of 169 years. In 1743, a memorial obelisk was placed over his grave in the nearby churchyard of Bolton-on-Swale.

== See also ==
- Listed buildings in Ellerton-on-Swale
