= St Mary's Church, Bolton-on-Swale =

Grade II* listed church in Bolton-on-Swale, North Yorkshire, England

Coordinates: 54.3874°N 1.61286°W

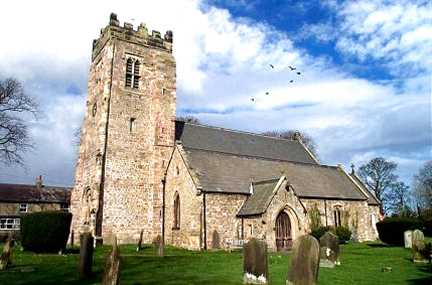
The church, in 2004

St Mary's Church is the parish church of Bolton-on-Swale, a village in North Yorkshire, in England.

The oldest parts of the current church are the south aisle and south doorway, which date from the early 14th century. The chancel and vestry are 15th century, while the tower dates from about 1550. It was heavily restored by George Fowler Jones in 1857, the work including rebuilding much of the nave, most of the windows, and replacing the roof. The chancel was remodelled in 1877 by Eden Nesfield. The church was grade II* listed in 1969.

The church is built of sandstone with Westmorland slate roofs. It consists of a nave, north and south aisles, a chancel with a north vestry and organ chamber, and a west tower. The tower has three stages, diagonal buttresses, a southeast stair turret, a three-light west window, a clock face on the west side, two-light bell openings, with cinquefoil heads, continuous decorated lintels and hood moulds, and an embattled parapet with coats of arms.

Inside the church is a 14th-century piscina, in the south aisle. The sanctuary has decorative tiles made by Nesfield with a mural above depicting angels ascending to Heaven, while the Carpenter chapel has similar tiling, with bas relief plasterwork depicting maritime and pastoral scenes from the Bible. In the south wall are part of four Mediaeval tomb slabs, while next to the pulpit is part of an Anglo-Danish cross shaft. There is a large black marble slab commemorating Henry Jenkins, who died at the supposed age of 169.

== See also ==
- Grade II* listed churches in North Yorkshire (district)
- Listed buildings in Bolton-on-Swale
