= Scorton Grammar School =

Defunct grammar school in North Yorkshire, England

Coordinates: 54.396°N 1.615°W

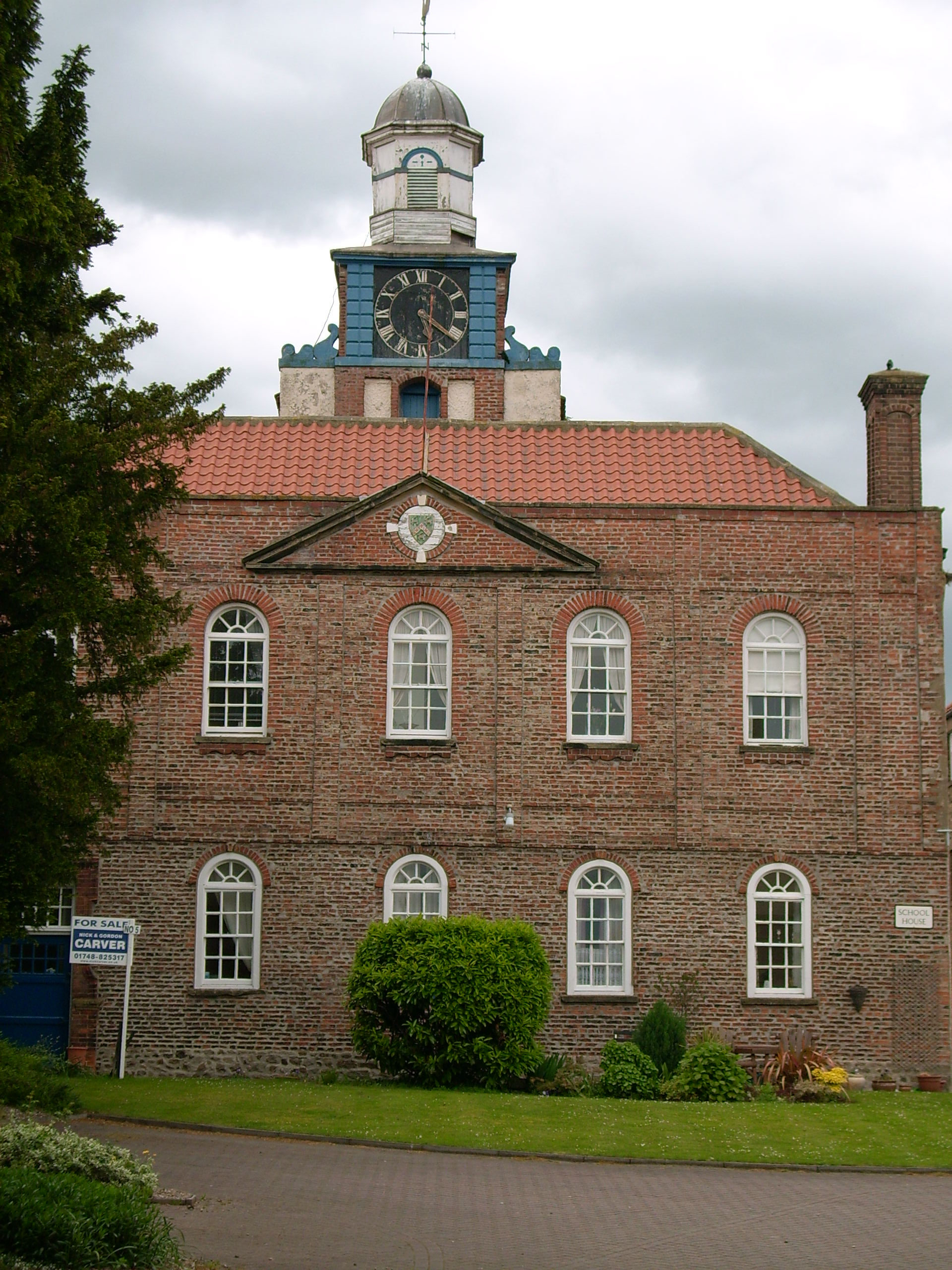
The main school building, after redevelopment

Scorton Grammar School is a former grammar school that was located in Scorton village, in Richmondshire, North Yorkshire, England.

== History ==
The school was founded by Leonard Robinson who bequeathed money, land and his house so that someone should "teach school in the town of Scorton"

The school's Latin motto was Sola in Deo Salus means "Safety in God alone". The school crest was the roebuck (the family crest of the founder).

The school was run as a private boys boarding school with day students from nearby villages until the decision was made to accept female pupils from 1989 in order to raise numbers at the school.

During the 1991 summer holidays, chairman of the governors John Bell announced, that the school was no longer viable with only 100 pupils. The school was a charitable trust but it was heavily indebted and the lack of new admissions meant that it would be impossible to continue operating and to balance the books.

Other small independent schools in the area have also closed over recent years, these include the Assumption Convent in Richmond in 1993 and the Great Ayton Friends' School in 1997.

After closure the four acre site was bought by a local builder named Randall Orchard. The main building was renovated and converted into flats, five large houses were built and an estate of more than 80 smaller homes was built on the grounds.

== Architecture ==
The former main building of the school is grade II listed. It is built of brick with a hipped pantile roof. There are two storeys, a double depth plan and five bays. The doorway has an eared architrave and a fanlight, and the windows are round-arched sashes with keystones. The upper floor bays are divided by pilasters that rise to the parapet. In the centre is a pediment containing an oculus with keystones containing a coat of arms. On the roof is a clock tower, and an octagonal wooden cupola with a lead roof and a weathervane.

== List of Headmasters ==
- John Noble was its first headmaster from 1720.
- Cecil Hale (1948-1958)
- Ken Freeman (Deputy.........Acting Head 1958-59
- Charles Illman (1959-1984)
- Martin Folliot (1984-1989)
- Dennis Hart (1989-1991).

== Alumni ==
- Lawrence Brockett (1724-1768) Cambridge professor
- Thomas Scott (1747-1821) preacher and author ("The Force of Truth" and "Commentary on the Whole Bible")
- Henry Swinburne (1743–1803), the travel writer.
- Rev. David Simpson, (1745-1799)
- Thomas Kipling (bap. 1745, d. 1822), dean of Peterborough.
- John Leonard Wilson (1897-1970); he was Bishop of Singapore from 1941-1949, his ministrations at the Japanese PoW camp at Changi prison featured in a film called Singapore Story. He was Bishop of Birmingham from 1953-1969.
- Richard Lisle (1948- ), Professor of Geology, Cardiff University.
- Roderic Noble, (1953- ), former actor
- Sir Robert Moorsom (1760–1835) received an excellent education under the Revd Mr Holmes at Scorton grammar school. He went on to Captain The Revenge in the Battle of Trafalgar Revenge, and carried the great banner at Nelson's funeral. He was appointed rear-admiral (1810), vice-admiral (1814), and KCB in 1815. He was commander-in-chief at Chatham (1824–7) and was promoted admiral in 1830.

== See also ==
- Listed buildings in Scorton, North Yorkshire
