= Bolton-on-Swale =

Village and civil parish in North Yorkshire, England

Coordinates: 54°23′17″N 1°36′48″W

Bolton on Swale
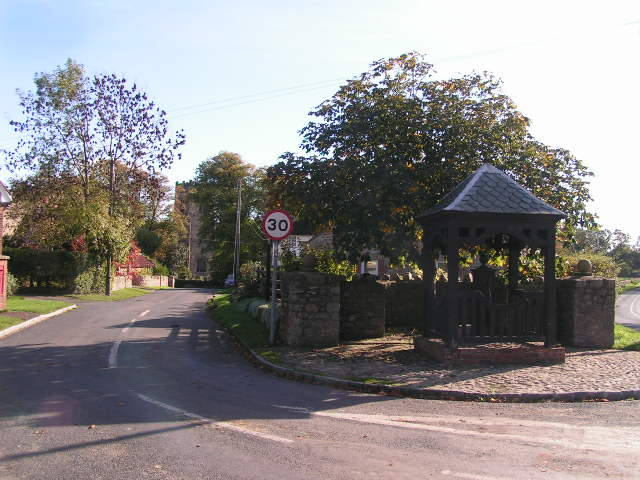
- Bolton-on-Swale, showing the village pump.

- Location within North Yorkshire
- Population: 70 (2015)
- OS grid reference: SE251992
- Unitary authority: North Yorkshire
- Ceremonial county: North Yorkshire
- Region: Yorkshire and the Humber
- Country: England
- Sovereign state: United Kingdom
- Post town: RICHMOND
- Postcode district: DL10
- Dialling code: 01748
- Police: North Yorkshire
- Fire: North Yorkshire
- Ambulance: Yorkshire
- UK Parliament: Richmond and Northallerton

Bolton-on-Swale is a village and civil parish in the county of North Yorkshire, England. In 2015, North Yorkshire County Council estimated the population of the civil parish to be 70.

== History ==
The village is mentioned in the Domesday Book as Boletone and belonged to Count Alan of Brittany as Tenant-in-Chief. The manor had been granted by Count Alan to Thor at the time of the Norman invasion, but afterwards it was granted to Enisant Musard. The manor was passed to Roald the Constable thereafter until it came into the possession of the Scrope family in Masham. They held the titles until around 1630. The descent is somewhat confused after this, but the title was seen to be in use in the 18th century by the Burton and Garthwaite families. In 1820 the title was in use by the Earl of Tyrconnell. The name derives from the Old English bōðl-tūn, meaning an enclosure with buildings.

== Governance ==
The village lies within the Richmond and Northalleton UK Parliament constituency. From 1974 to 2023 it was part of the district of Richmondshire and is now administered by the unitary North Yorkshire Council.

== Community and culture ==
Bolton-on-Swale St Mary's C of E (VA) Primary School serves Bolton-on-Swale and Scorton. There are fewer than 100 pupils, divided into 4 classes.

== Geography ==
As the name suggests it is close to the River Swale. Bolton Beck is a tributary of the Swale and passes under a small bridge at the north of the village. The village is on the B6271 road between Scorton and Northallerton. The Coast to Coast Walk passes through the village. The village is just 0.3 miles (0.48 km) south of Scorton and 1.1 miles (1.8 km) north-east of Catterick.

=== Climate ===
Climate data for Bolton-on-Swale
| Month | Jan | Feb | Mar | Apr | May | Jun | Jul | Aug | Sep | Oct | Nov | Dec | Year |
|---|---|---|---|---|---|---|---|---|---|---|---|---|---|
| Mean daily maximum °C (°F) | 7 (45) | 8 (46) | 10 (50) | 12 (54) | 16 (61) | 18 (64) | 21 (70) | 21 (70) | 18 (64) | 14 (57) | 10 (50) | 7 (45) | 14 (57) |
| Mean daily minimum °C (°F) | 1 (34) | 0 (32) | 1 (34) | 2 (36) | 5 (41) | 7 (45) | 10 (50) | 10 (50) | 7 (45) | 4 (39) | 2 (36) | 0 (32) | 4 (39) |
| Average precipitation mm (inches) | 53 (2.1) | 43 (1.7) | 41 (1.6) | 56 (2.2) | 43 (1.7) | 64 (2.5) | 51 (2) | 66 (2.6) | 61 (2.4) | 64 (2.5) | 58 (2.3) | 58 (2.3) | 660 (25.9) |
Source: Weatherbase

== Religion ==
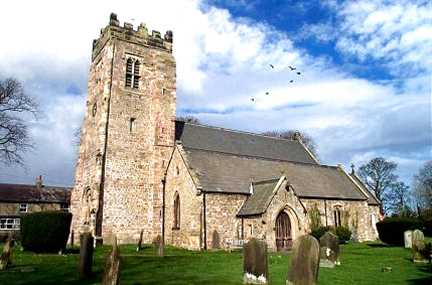
St Mary's Church dates from the 14th century

St Mary's Church, Bolton-on-Swale, serves the village and a number of other small villages, hamlets and farmsteads in the surrounding countryside. The church is a Grade II* Listed Building built on the site of previous Norman and Saxon structures. The present building was erected during the early 14th century and was enlarged and restored by George Fowler Jones in 1859. Some sarcophagi were found during the restoration and are now on the interior wall by the door. The vestry has an unusual stone roof, which seems to be a portion of the original Saxon structure. In the graveyard is the tomb of Henry Jenkins who, it is claimed, lived to be 169 years old. The dates on the tomb are 1500–1670.

== Notable buildings ==
Nearby is Bolton Old Hall, a 15th-century peel tower, altered and extended in the 16th and 17th centuries. The building is Grade II* listed by English Heritage.

== See also ==
- Listed buildings in Bolton-on-Swale
- Forest, North Yorkshire
