= Scorton, North Yorkshire =

Village and civil parish in North Yorkshire, England

Coordinates: 54.3969°N 1.6116°W

Scorton
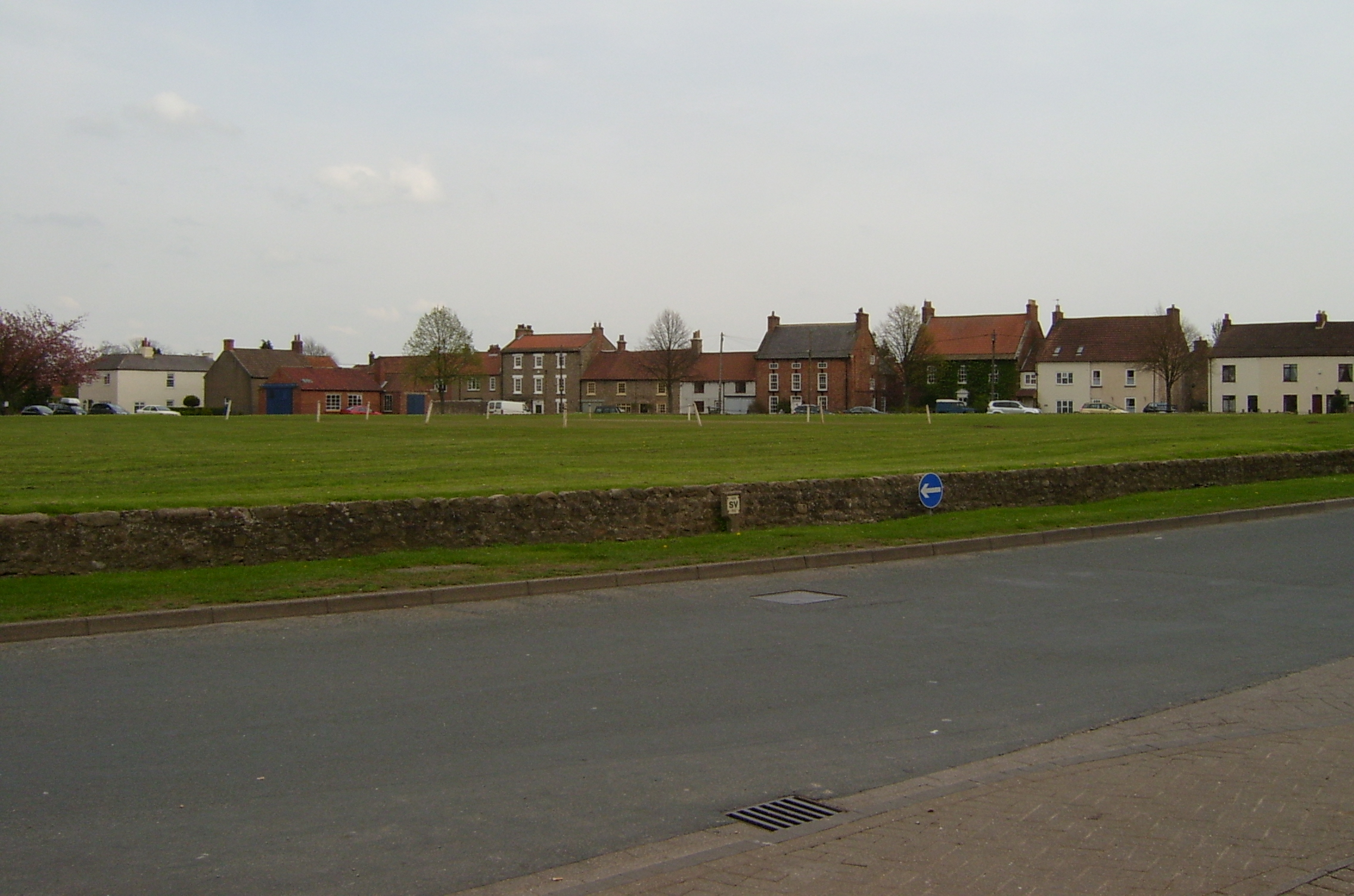
- Scorton Village Green

- Location within North Yorkshire
- Population: 1,012 (Including Uckerby. 2011)
- OS grid reference: NZ249002
  - London: 200 mi (320 km) S
- Unitary authority: North Yorkshire
- Ceremonial county: North Yorkshire
- Region: Yorkshire and the Humber
- Country: England
- Sovereign state: United Kingdom
- Post town: RICHMOND
- Postcode district: DL10
- Dialling code: 01748
- Police: North Yorkshire
- Fire: North Yorkshire
- Ambulance: Yorkshire
- UK Parliament: Richmond and Northallerton

Scorton is a village and civil parish in the county of North Yorkshire, England. It is approximately 8 miles (13 km) north-west of the county town of Northallerton.

== History ==
The village is mentioned in Domesday Book as "Scortone" in the lands of Count Alan of Brittany, who was tenant-in-chief during the Norman invasion. Before the invasion the manor was granted to Thorfin of Ravensworth but subsequently granted in 1086 to Bodin, brother of Bardulf. The manor was thereafter split into two parts, the larger granted to the Fitz Hugh family and the smaller to the Fitz Alans. The descent of the larger part of the manor followed that of the manor of Kirkby Ravensworth until 1512 when it came into the Fiennes family, who were entitled as Baron Dacre. In 1600 the manor was left to Charles Tankard and Christopher Jeynes, who had sold it to Leonard Wastell by 1616. Towards the end of the 18th century the manor passed to the Earl of Tyrconnel and followed that family's descent.

The name is derived from a combination of the Old Norse word skor, meaning a rift in the rock, and the Old English suffix tūn, meaning farm or settlement. Put together they mean ravine farm.

Scorton was home to the now closed Scorton Grammar School, 1720–1991. Most of the buildings and grounds have been converted into houses. Scorton has a raised village green, one of only two in England. It is said that the green was built in the early 18th century by John Noble, the first headmaster of Scorton Grammar School. There was also the St John of God Hospital, built in 1880 in the grounds of the former convent of St Clare, later a nursing home, Abbey Care Village.

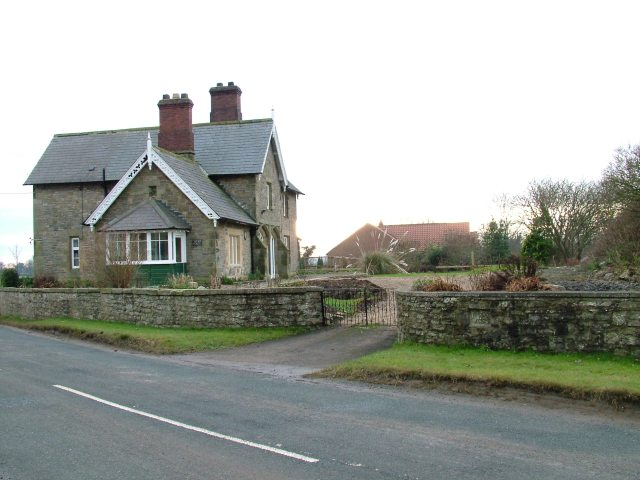
Former Scorton Station, North Yorkshire

Between 1939 and 1945 the village was home to RAF Scorton, which served as a satellite of RAF Catterick. Many squadrons flew from Scorton during the Second World War including No. 56 Squadron RAF who flew Spitfires and others who flew Beaufighters. The aerodrome has now been extensively quarried away.

Scorton was once served by the Eryholme-Richmond branch line but it was closed in 1969. The station building is now a house and much of the line between Scorton railway station and Catterick Bridge has been destroyed by quarrying.

== Governance ==
The village is in the Richmond and Northallerton UK Parliament constituency. From 1974 to 2023 it was part of the district of Richmondshire, it is now administered by the unitary North Yorkshire Council.

== Geography ==
The village is at the northern end of the B6271 from Northallerton where the B1263 from Richmond joins it. Scorton Beck, a tributary of the River Swale, flows south on the east side of the village. The nearest settlements are Bolton-on-Swale 0.5 miles (0.8 km) to the south, Catterick 1.4 miles (2.3 km) to the south west and Brompton-on-Swale 2 miles (3.2 km) to the west.

== Demography ==
Population
Year	1881	1891	1901	1911	1921	1931	1951	1961	2001	2011
Total	407	515	465	544	558	572	764	871	959	1,012

=== 2001 census ===
The 2001 UK census showed that the population was 48.6% male and 51.4% female. The religious constituency was 84% Christian and the rest stating no religion or not stating at all. The ethnic make-up was 97.6% White British, 1.7% White other and 0.7% White Irish. There were 367 dwellings.

=== 2011 census ===
The 2011 UK census showed that the population was still 48.6% male and 51.4% female. The religious constituency was 76.8% Christian, 0.2% Buddhist, 0.1% Muslim, 0.4% Hindu, 0.1% Jewish and the rest stating no religion or not stating at all. The ethnic make-up was 96.7% White British, 1.3% White Other, 0.8% Mixed Ethnic, 0.8% British Asian and 0.1% British Black. There were 403 dwellings.

== Community and culture ==
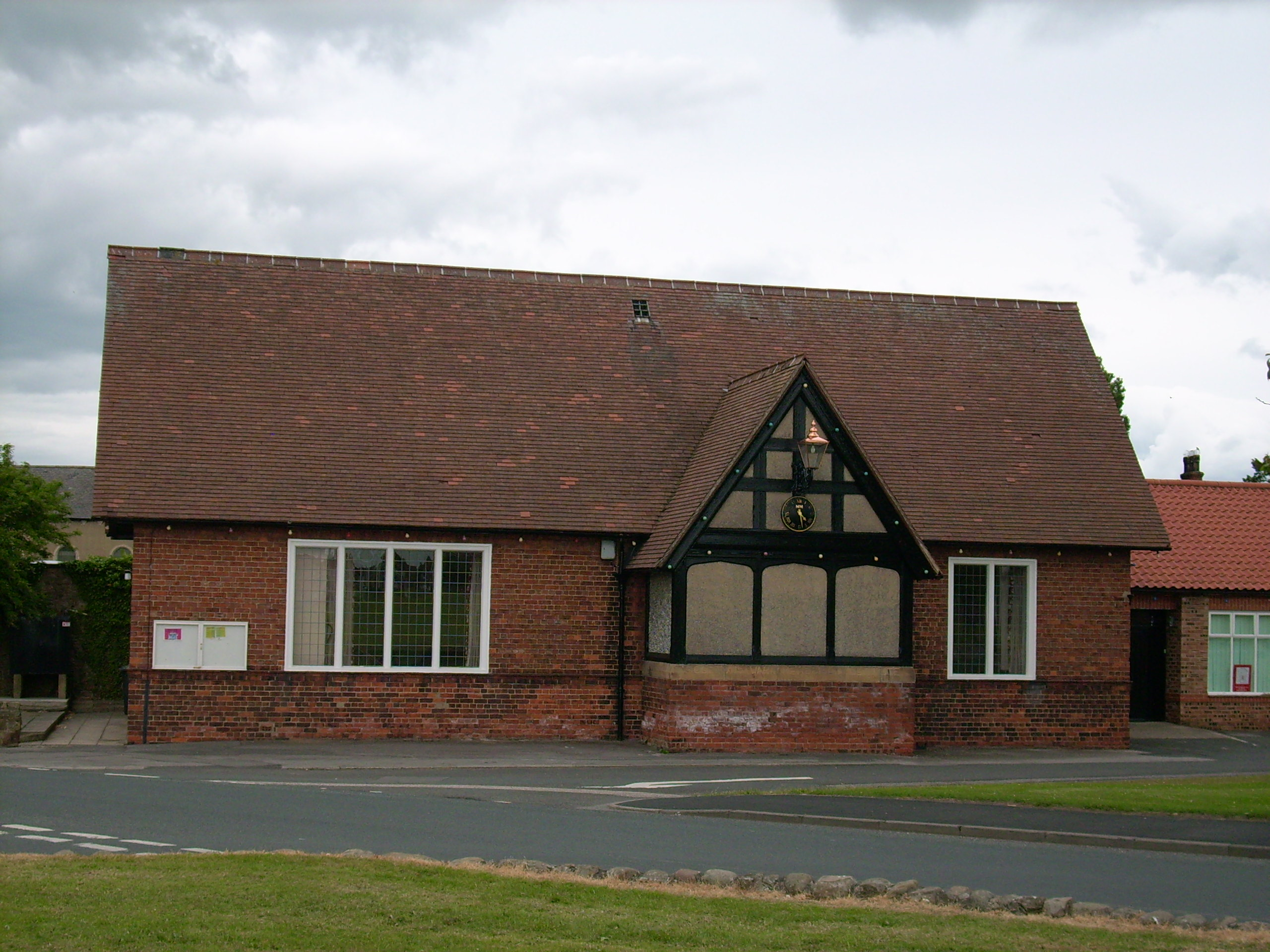
Scorton village hall

Scorton once had four public houses. The Royal and St Cuthbert's Inn have been closed and converted into houses. The Heifer and the Farmers’ Arms survive. There are several small businesses including a village shop incorporating a post office. Education for Years 1-6 is provided at Bolton-on-Swale St Mary's Church of England (VA) Primary School.

The village is home to the Ancient Scorton Silver Arrow contest, an archery competition founded in the village in 1673 which returns to Scorton only when a resident wins as last happened in 2008. Scorton is also known for the annual Scorton Feast held around 15 August each year, which celebrated its 750th anniversary in 2006.

== Religion ==
Scorton Methodist Church, on the village green, was built in 1908 and formed part of the Richmond Circuit but is now on the North Yorkshire Dales Circuit. St Mary's Church in Bolton-on-Swale is the nearest Church of England place of worship and St Joseph and St Francis Xavier Church in Richmond is the nearest Roman Catholic Church.

== See also ==
- Listed buildings in Scorton, North Yorkshire
- Forest, North Yorkshire
