= Church of St Mary, Ecclesfield =

Grade I listed church in South Yorkshire, England

Coordinates: 53.4436°N 1.4699°W

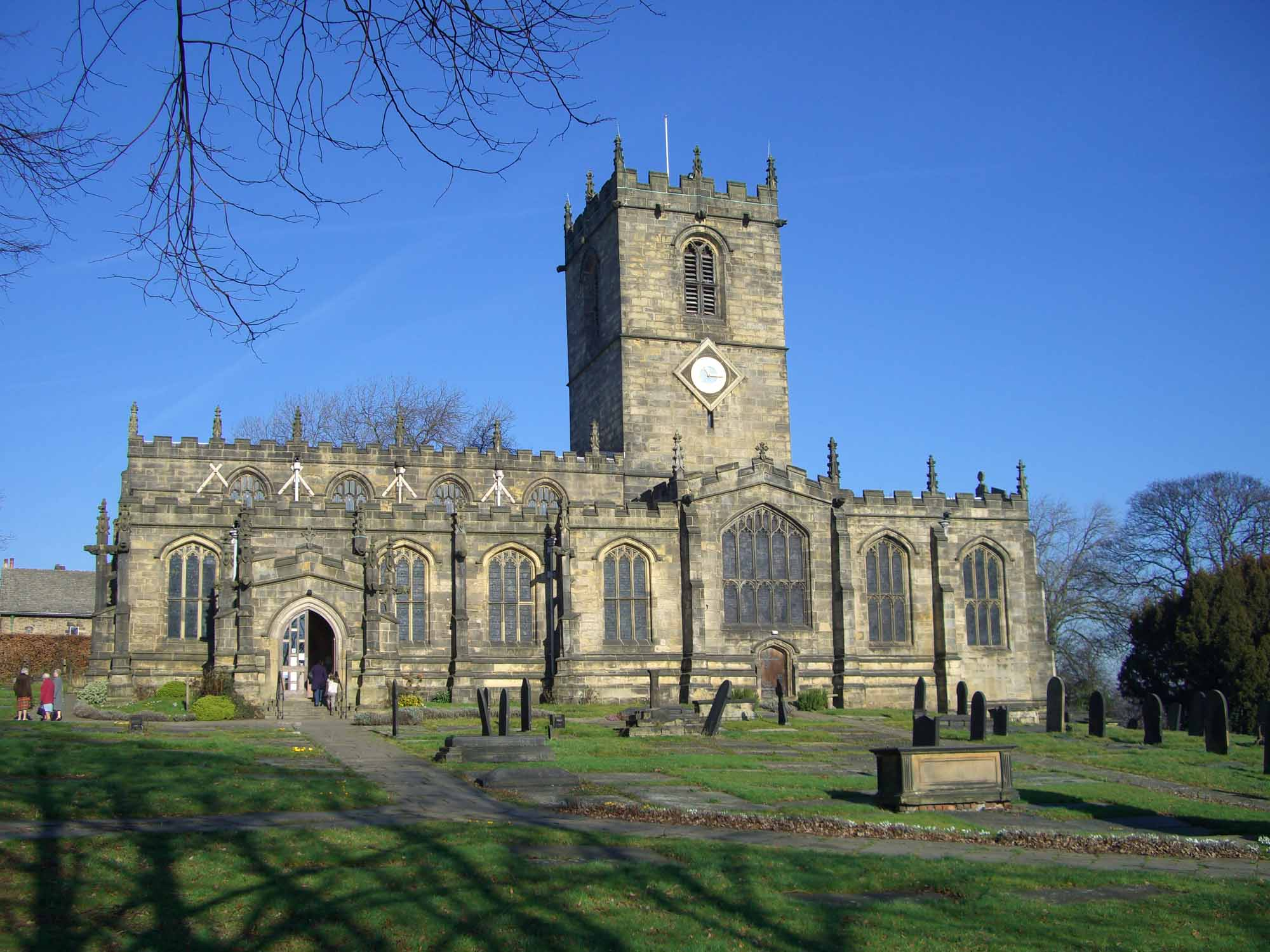
St Mary's Church, Ecclesfield

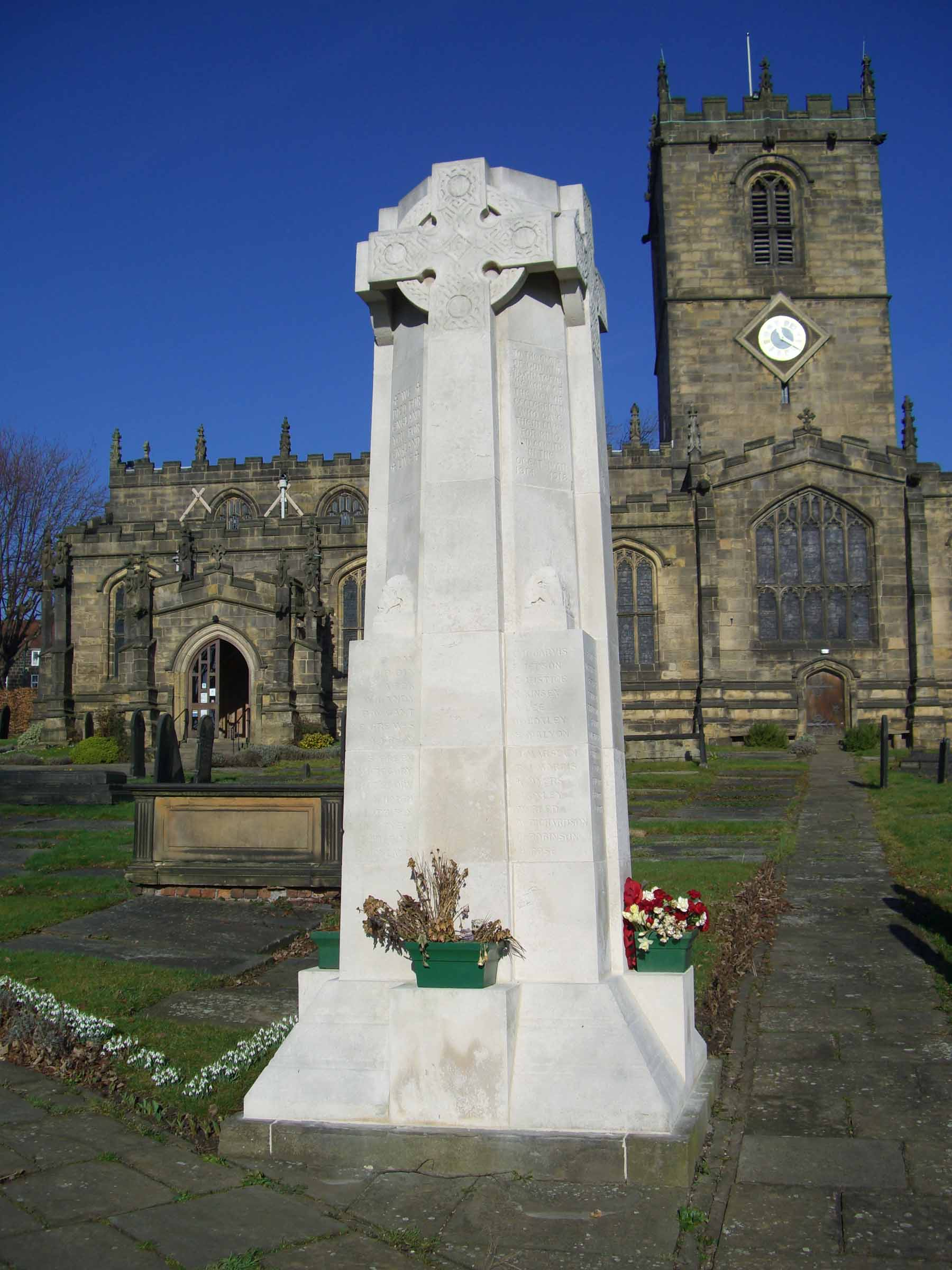
The war memorial outside the church

The Church of St Mary, Ecclesfield, is situated on Church Street in the village of Ecclesfield, Sheffield, South Yorkshire, England. It is situated 4 miles (6.4 km) north of the city centre. It is a Grade I listed building, one of only five within the Sheffield city boundary. It was originally the parish church for Hallamshire, one of the largest parishes in England and in the seventeenth century was known as the "Minster of the Moors" due to its then rural situation.

== History ==
The exact date for the creation of a church on the site of St Mary's is unknown. The name Ecclesfield, which may mean "Church in the Field" in the Old English language, is mentioned in the Domesday Book (though the church is not), so it is possible that there might have been some sort of place of worship there before the Norman conquest of England. It has been implied by historians that the Anglo-Saxons founded a church on the site between 625 and 650.

After the conquest and the repercussions of the Harrying of the North the lands around Ecclesfield passed to William de Lovetot at the start of the twelfth century. It was de Lovetot who built the first substantial church on the site, with a date of 1111 often given, however there is no written evidence to support this date. The church was given to the monks of Fontenelle Abbey, near Rouen, Normandy, becoming an "alien priory", a small group of monks came from France to live there. In 1386 Richard II dissolved the alien priories and handed over the church to the Carthusian Monks of Coventry who held it until the Dissolution of the Monasteries in the late 1530s, when it was handed over to the Lords of Hallamshire. The parish at the time was 82 square miles, one of the largest in England and because of this size, Ecclesfield had four churchwardens instead of the usual two and this tradition has been retained

Construction of the present-day church began in 1478 and was completed around 1500, being built in the perpendicular style. However, parts of the nave and the main pillars supporting the nave roof and the tower are from the earlier twelfth-century building. Under Puritan influence in the 1640s many of the church's decorative pieces and all the stained glass was smashed after a 1643 Act of Parliament that stated "all representations of any angel or saint in any… parish church…was to be taken away, defaced and utterly demolished." Some of the surviving glass from the windows was pieced together and put into windows in the north aisle and vestry. The eighteenth and nineteenth centuries saw much re-ordering in the church especially to the nave and chancel under the respective vicars William Ryder and Alfred Gatty.

In 1878, a football club representing Ecclesfield Church joined the Sheffield Football Association.

== Present day ==
The church thrives in the twenty-first century with a few modern touches such as a kitchen, lavatory and modern heating and lighting. In 2019, the building was registered as a Major Parish Church and in 2021, work was completed to open a revised entrance at the West End which provided level access with electric doors helping the able and less able to access without external assistance. The church is built of local stone and has an octagonal font. The pulpit dates from 1876 with four panels carved with scenes from St Paul's life, the lectern was installed at the same time. Since the Second World War, both the chancel and the nave have been given new roofs. The tower contains a peal of ten bells, two of which date from the seventeenth century. Music in the church is provided by a pipe organ. The church yard contains a war memorial made from light coloured limestone, it was designed by R. B. Brook-Greaves and has the names of 54 local people engraved on it who gave their lives in the First World War, 36 local people who gave their lives in the Second World War and one name of a man who gave his life in the Falklands War. The memorial is Grade II listed.

The church houses a rare carved Anglo-Saxon cross shaft dating to the early 11th century AD. It is around five feet high and is fitted into a double base. Found in 1892 buried outside the west door it has been reconstructed inside the church. Pieces of a second cross were uncovered in 2020 in the same location as the original find. In the churchyard is a sundial mounted on a base with what may be an ancient lower part.

The grave of Joseph Hunter, a prominent antiquarian and archivist, and author of the important local history Hallamshire (1819), can be found in the churchyard.

Also buried in the churchyard are Alexander John Scott, chaplain to Horatio Nelson, who was present at his death at the Battle of Trafalgar and his daughter Margaret Gatty, a writer and botanist. The grave of Parkin Jeffcock, an English mining engineer who died trying to effect the rescue of miners during the Oaks mining disaster can also be found there. The current vicar is Revd. Dr. Tim Gill who was instituted on 28 July 2016 by the Bishop of Doncaster.
