= Sophie Dora Spicer Maude =

English writer (1854–1937)

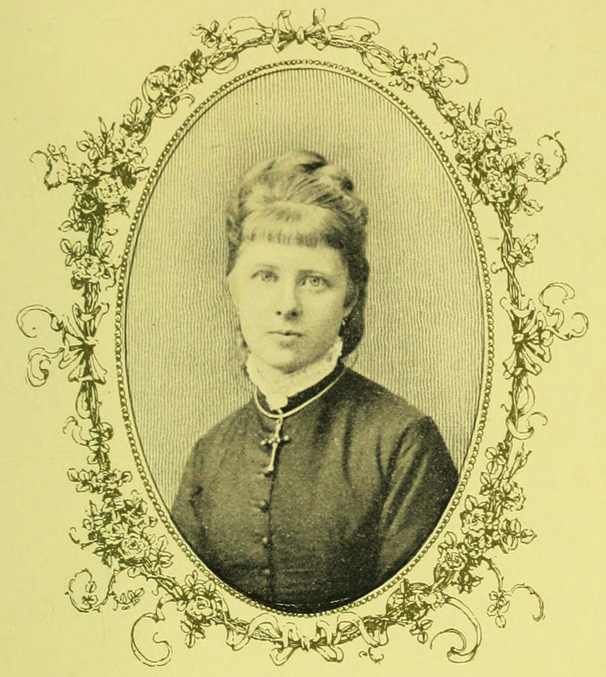
- Photo A Round table of the representative Irish and English Catholic novelists, 1897
- Born: Sophie Dora Spicer; 7 May 1854; Esher, Surrey, England
- Died: 7 April 1937 (aged 82); Kensington, London, England
- Occupation: writer
- Spouse: William Cassel Maude (m. 1890)
- Parents: J. W. G. Spicer; Juliana Hannah Webb Probyn
- Writing career
- Pen name: Mrs. William Maude
- Language: English

Signature
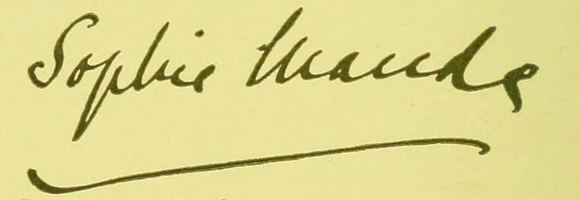

Sophie Dora Spicer Maude (née, Spicer; pen name, Mrs. William Maude; 7 May 1854 – 7 April 1937) was a British writer. Her early publication included Cyril's Hobby Horse (1870) and Two little Hearts (1874).

== Early life and education ==
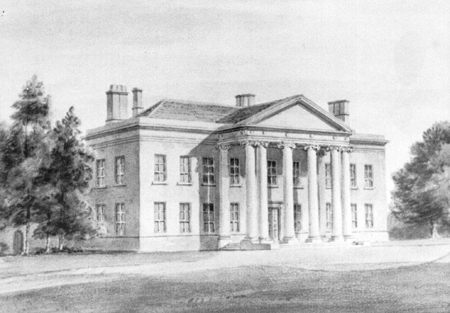
Spye House (18th century)

Sophie (sometimes, "Sophia") Dora Spicer was born in Esher, Surrey, 7 May 1854. Her parents were Major John William Gooch Spicer, J.P., D.L., of Spye Park, Wiltshire, and Juliana Hannah Webb (Probyn) Spicer (1823-1898). She had several siblings including, John, Juliana, Louisa, Julian, Emily, Mary, and Janet.

She was brought up in a house within an English deer park, her parents choosing to live there when she was ten years old. Here, she wrote her first stories in nursery and schoolroom days, but these never appeared in print. She was never sent away to school, but attended with her younger sisters a Belgrave Square schoolroom during successive London seasons, while the elder siblings went to balls and parties.

== Career ==
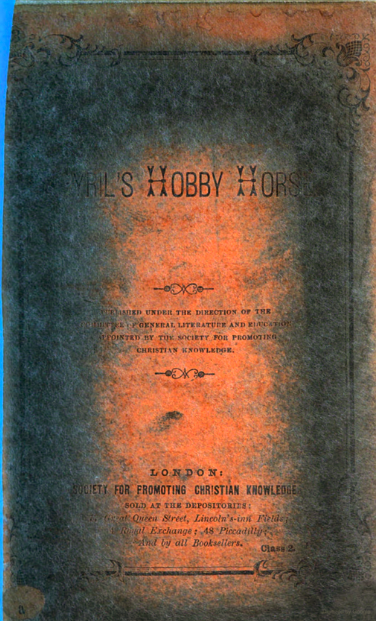
Cyril's Hobby Horse (1870)

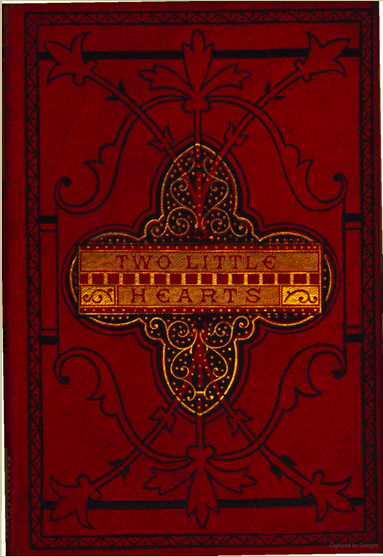
Two little hearts (1874)

Her first publication was a story written in aid of the Sick Children's Hospital in Great Ormond Street, brought out by the Society for Promoting Christian Knowledge (SPCK) in 1870, and called "Cyril's Hobby Horse". The proceeds went to the Children's Hospital. When twelve years old, she ventured to send a story to Aunt Judy's Magazine, which was declined, but "Aunt Judy's" letter was treasured — a kind, sympathetic letter, beautifully worded as only Margaret Gatty knew how to write. "Two little Hearts" (1874) was her next publication.

After a few years, she was received into the Catholic Church, and lived some time abroad. She gave up writing for a while, but soon began again, and through Monsignor Nugent, then editor of The Fireside, her stories appeared from time to time in both the Catholic Times and Catholic Fireside. The Catholic Truth Society has reprinted one of these, "The Runaway Marriage", and later brought out a volume of her short stories.

Maude's book, The Child Countess, appeared in 1893. She prepared another, A Prisoner of Purgatory, but was uncertain that the title would hold. Additional publications included, A Runaway Marriage, 1894; The Duchess of York's Page, 1900; The Duchess's baby, 1908; John and Joan, 1909; A Story of St Germain; and Nancy.

== Personal life ==
She married William Cassell Maude, of Brackenwood, Bournemouth, on 19 April 1890, at St. Mary's Church, Cadogan Street. He was a barrister and belonged to the old Yorkshire family of Maude. The wife thought he should be called "the children's friend", his interest in the spiritual welfare of Catholic workhouse infants being so well known.

Sophie Dora Spicer Maude died 7 April 1937 at Kensington, London, England.

== Selected works ==
- Cyril's Hobby Horse, 1870
- Two little Hearts, 1874
- Three Christmases, 1892
- The Child Countess, 1893
- A Runaway Marriage, 1894
- The Duchess of York's Page, 1900
- A Story of St Germain, 1903
- Poor Nancy and Other Tales, 1906
- The Duchess's Baby, 1908
- John and Joan, 1909

=== Short stories ===
- "The Honourable"
