= Stephen Herbert Gatty =

British barrister and colonial judge (1849–1922)

Sir Stephen Gatty
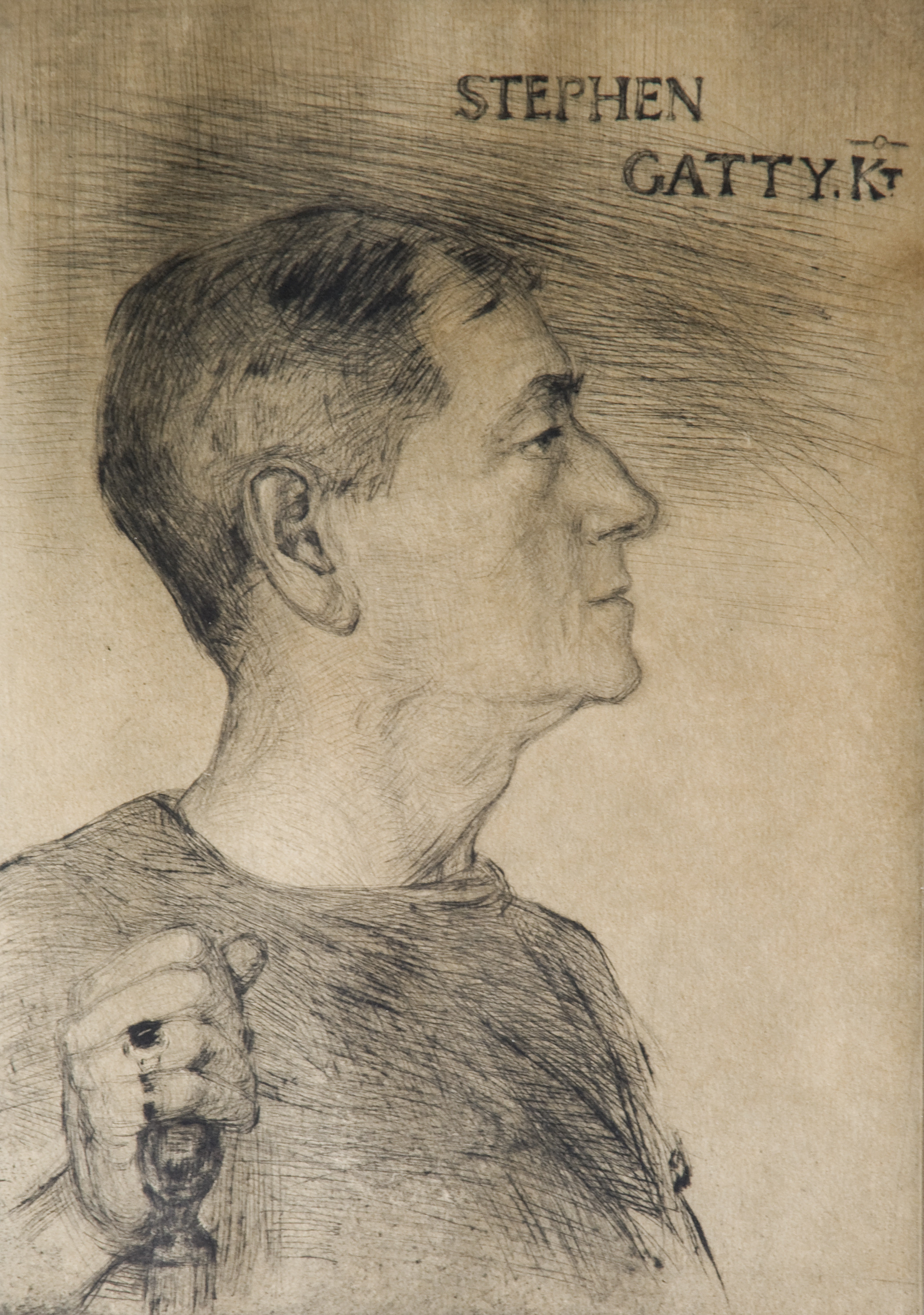

Chief Justice of Gibraltar
- In office 1895–1905

Personal details
- Born: Stephen Herbert Gatty

Sir Stephen Herbert Gatty (9 October 1849 – 29 April 1922) was a British barrister and colonial judge who served as Chief Justice of Gibraltar from 1895 to 1905.

== Biography ==
Gatty was the son of the Rev Alfred Gatty and of Margaret Gatty. He came from a literary family: both his mother and his sister Juliana Horatia Ewing were popular children's authors. His elder brother Sir Alfred Scott-Gatty was a herald and composer, while his younger brother Charles Tindal Gatty was an antiquarian and author of note.

Educated at Winchester College (where he was a scholar) and New College, Oxford, Gatty was called to the bar by the Middle Temple in 1874, then went on the North-Eastern Circuit. He was appointed Attorney-General of the Leeward Islands in 1883, then successively served as acting Chief Justice of Antigua, Attorney-General of Trinidad (at the same time serving as chairman of royal commissions on the franchise of Trinidad and on the metayer system in Tobago), Judge of the Supreme Court of the Straits Settlements, and Chief Justice of Gibraltar. He was made a QC for Trinidad in 1890/1891 knighted in 1904.

== Personal life ==
Gatty married firstly Alice Georgina Rawlinson (1849–1894) on 29 August 1876; they had no issue. Gatty then married Katharine Morrison (1869–1949), daughter of Alfred Morrison, on 21 February 1905. Their children were Hester Gatty (1906–1973), wife of Siegfried Sassoon, Oliver Gatty (1907–1940) and Richard Gatty (1909–1975).
