= Boarhills =

Coordinates: 56.3163°N 2.7048°W

- Location within Fife
- Population: 80 (2001)
- OS grid reference: NO564140
- Council area: Fife
- Lieutenancy area: Fife
- Country: Scotland
- Sovereign state: United Kingdom
- Post town: St Andrews
- Postcode district: KY16
- Dialling code: 01334
- Police: Scotland
- Fire: Scottish
- Ambulance: Scottish
- UK Parliament: North East Fife
- Scottish Parliament: Fife North East Mid Scotland and Fife

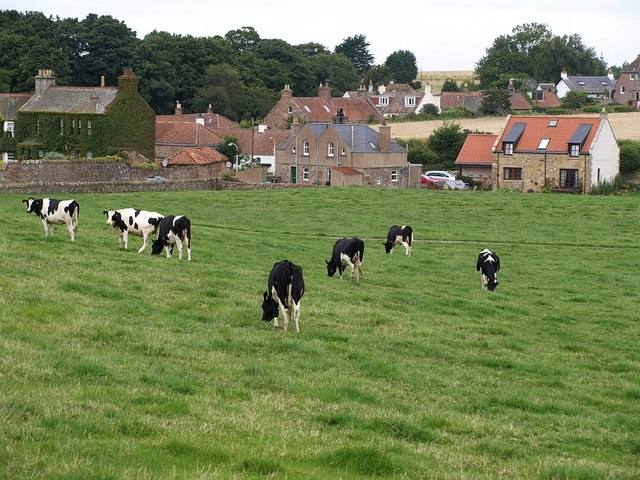
Boarhills in August 2008

Boarhills is a hamlet close to Kingsbarns in the East Neuk of Fife, Scotland. It is located off the A917 road, 4 1/2 miles (7 km) from St Andrews and 5 1/2 miles (9 km) from Crail, close to the mouth of Kenly Water with the North Sea.

== History ==
Boarhills Church, built in 1866–67, stands apart from the village, with a large bellcote at its western end. Boarhills had a primary school, built in 1815 and which closed in the 1990s.

Boarhills had a railway station on the North British Railway line from Thornton Junction to St Andrews via Crail. The station closed to passengers on 22 September 1930 and to goods on 5 October 1964. The line was closed completely on 6 September 1965. This station was sited to the south of the A917.

Buddo Rock is a sandstone sea stack on a raised beach close to Boarhills, 800 metres (2,600 ft) from Buddo Ness, accessible by the Fife Coastal Path. Nearby is a former lifeboat station, built between 1860 and 1890.

== Notable residents ==
- Boarhills has been home to three directors of the Gatty Marine Laboratory: professors James Munro Dodd, Adrian Horridge and Michael Laverack.
