= Charles Gatty =

Charles Gatty may refer to:

- Charles Henry Gatty (1836–1903), British zoologist, meteorologist, landowner and philanthropist
- Charles Tindal Gatty (1851–1928), British antiquary, musician, author, and lecturer
