= Jeffcock =

Jeffcock is a surname. Notable people with the surname include:

- Parkin Jeffcock (1829–1866), English mining engineer
- William Jeffcock (1800–1871), English politician
