= Michael Laverack =

British zoologist

Michael Stuart Laverack MIB FRSE (19 March 1931 – 28 July 1993) was a British zoologist who was director of the Gatty Marine Laboratory from 1969 to 1985. He emigrated to Australia and was noted for his contributions to marine biology.

== Life ==
Laverack was born in Croydon in outer London on 19 March 1931. He was educated at Selhurst Grammar School for Boys in Surrey. He was evacuated from London as a schoolboy during the Second World War. He did National Service in the RAF from 1949 to 1951, then studied zoology at the University of Southampton, graduating BSc in 1955. He studied under professors Gerald A. Kerkut and K. A. Munday, who greatly influenced his field of interest. His thesis on the snail helix under Kerkut gained him his doctorate (PhD) in 1959.

His first job was as scientific officer to Merlewood Research Centre at Grange-over-Sands in Cumbria, but from here he moved in 1960 to begin lecturing at St Andrews University. Here he was based at the Gatty Marine Laboratory with researchers Malcolm Burrows and Adrian Horridge.

In 1972 he was elected a fellow of the Royal Society of Edinburgh. His proposers were David R. R. Burt, Harold Callan, James A. Macdonald, and Anthony E. Ritchie.

In 1979 he founded the department of marine biology together with Chris Todd. During his time in St Andrews University he lived at Boarhills, a small coastal village to the south.

In 1985 he left the Gatty and spent several years as a travelling professor giving lectures around the world. In 1989 he accepted a fellowship at the University of Melbourne in Australia and moved there with his wife, keen to study Australia's diverse marine life.

He was killed on 28 July 1993 in a helicopter crash en route to Heron Island Research Station embarking on a further study of the Great Barrier Reef. His wife Maureen Cole was killed with him. They had two sons and one daughter.

A memorial gathering was held in January 1994 at Crail Community Centre to mark the contribution which Laverack had made both to his field and to the local community.

== Publications ==
- The Physiology of Earthworms (1963)
- Lecture Notes on Invertebrate Zoology (1974) co-written with J. Dando

Founding editor of Marine Behaviour and Physiology
