= Gatty Marine Laboratory =

Scottish research facility

East Sands beach, St Andrews, viewed from the Gatty Marine Laboratory

The Gatty Marine Laboratory is a science facility located in the coastal town of St Andrews in Fife, Scotland. It is part of the University of St Andrews and home to the Scottish Oceans Institute, an interdisciplinary research institute studying the marine environment, specifically the behaviour, ecology, physiology, population biology and functional genomics of marine organisms. The Gatty Marine Laboratory is where Richard G. Morris developed the Morris water navigation task in the early 1980s.

== History ==
The laboratory was paid for by the zoologist Charles Henry Gatty (1836-1903) during his later life (1892), having no family to leave his fortune to. He paid both for an original timber building (1892)and its permanent stone replacement (1896), which was designed by James Gillespie.

Its first Director was William Carmichael McIntosh. The permanent building was officially opened on 3 October 1896 by Lord Reay, at which point the timber building was abandoned. The building was badly damaged by fire in 1913.

The Gatty Marine Laboratory has been continuously occupied except for the period between 1931 and the end of World War II. The laboratory has its origins in the government-funded St Andrews Fisheries Laboratory, which was founded in 1884. The first director, William Carmichael McIntosh, conducted pioneering work on the taxonomy of annelids and the early life histories of marine fish over more than 50 years. In 1945-46 the Gatty (as it is informally known) received an operating budget of £50 and was used as a field station by zoologists and botanists based in the Bute Medical Building in the town centre.

Until 1960 the Gatty was led by James Munro Dodd. From 1960 till 1969 the laboratory was under the Directorship of Adrian Horridge, succeeded from 1969 to 1985 by Michael Laverack. All 3 directors lived in Boarhills.

Since 1987, the "Gatty" has been a component Research Institute of the School of Biology (although the name and composition of the school has changed several times). The laboratory built up strong research groupings in fish biology and marine ecology and by the early 1990s received the highest number of research grants in marine biology of any UK department. In 1997, a major £4.3 million extension to the building was financed by the University Court. The new building provided a modern lecture theatre and teaching laboratory, and research laboratories for immunological and muscle research. The major part of the new build was occupied by the Natural Environment Research Council (NERC) sponsored Sea Mammal Research Unit, which transferred to the site from Cambridge in 1996.
