= Alfred Scott-Gatty =

English officer of arms and composer (1847–1918)

Sir Alfred Scott-Gatty KCVO KStJ FSA
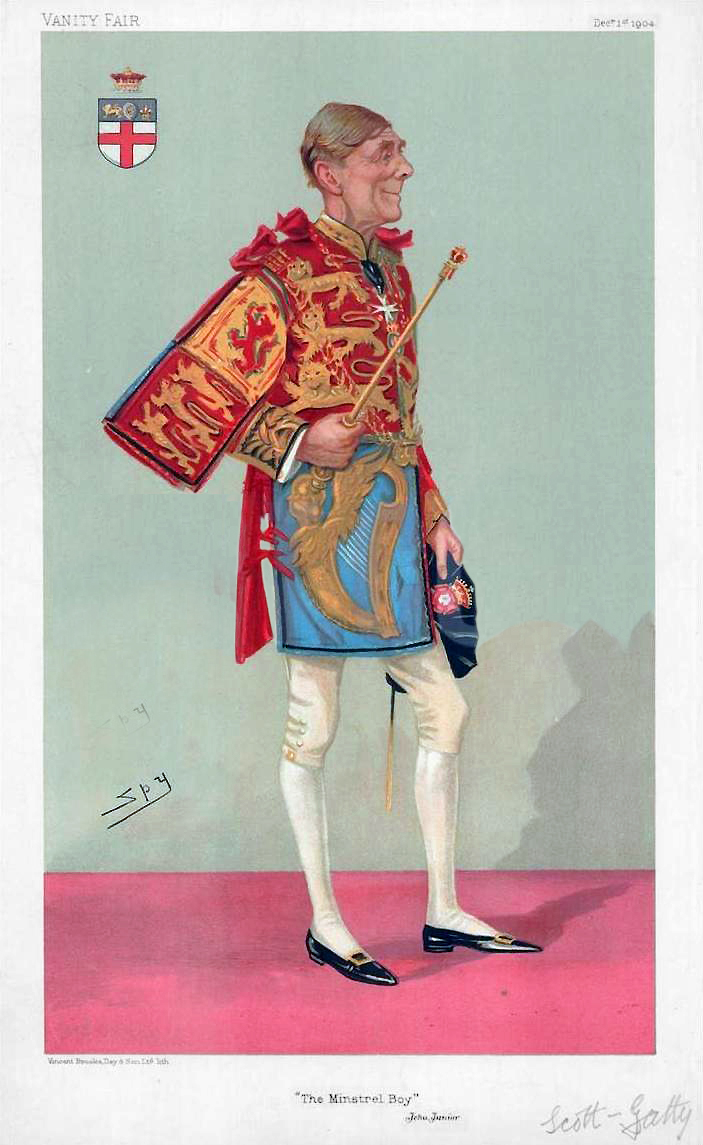
- A caricature of Alfred Scott-Gatty in his ceremonial tabard by Sir Leslie Ward, 1904

Garter Principal King of Arms
- In office 1904–1918
- Monarchs: Edward VII; George V
- Preceded by: Sir Albert Woods
- Succeeded by: Sir Henry Farnham Burke

Personal details
- Born: Alfred Gatty; 26 April 1847 Ecclesfield, West Riding of Yorkshire, England
- Died: 18 December 1918 (aged 71)

Sir Alfred Scott-Gatty KCVO KStJ FSA (né Gatty; 26 April 1847 – 18 December 1918) was a long serving officer of arms at the College of Arms in London and a successful composer.

== Personal life ==
Alfred Scott-Gatty was born in Ecclesfield, West Riding of Yorkshire (now part of Sheffield, South Yorkshire) with the given name of Alfred Gatty. He was the son of Alfred Gatty of Bellerby, Yorkshire who was serving as Vicar of Ecclesfield and his wife, Margaret. Scott-Gatty was educated at Marlborough and Christ's College, Cambridge. He assumed the name of Scott-Gatty in 1892, Scott being his mother's maiden name.

== Heraldic career ==
Scott-Gatty began his heraldic career with his appointment as Rouge Dragon Pursuivant of Arms In Ordinary in 1880. He held that post for six years until his promotion to the office of York Herald of Arms in Ordinary. During his service as such he was in July 1901 appointed an Esquire of the Order of St. John (EsqStJ), and in December 1903 promoted to a Knight of Grace of the same order. Scott-Gatty was appointed Garter Principal King of Arms in 1904 and held that office until his death in 1918.

It was under Scott-Gatty that the College of Arms reinstituted the process of granting badges to armigers. He was knighted for his services when he was appointed a Knight Commander of the Royal Victorian Order (KCVO) in June 1911, an honour personally bestowed by the King.

== Composing career ==
As a composer he was an amateur, but his work was popular and highly regarded in its day. The works that he produced were largely for voices and aimed primarily at amateur performers. It included two modest operettas, Sandford and Merton's Christmas Party (1880) and Not At Home (1886). It also included three musical plays specifically for children: Rumpelstiltskin, The Goose Girl (1895) and The Three Bears (1896). For the most part, these musical plays were set to words written by his sister, the noted children's writer Mrs Ewing. His songs ran into hundreds, many of them with texts by himself. A few of the best known titles were Ae Fond Kiss, Crofte and Ye Faire Ladye, True Till Death, and Country House Ditties (1898).

His hymn tune 'Welwyn' is used for the hymn 'O Strength and Stay'.

His concern to provide music for children, already noted, was pursued in Little Songs for Little Voices published in three volumes, including 76 short and simple songs. They were his earliest compositions and appeared in Aunt Judy's Magazine, edited first by his mother, then by his sister. Two of these songs, The Sneezing Song and Three Little Pigs were sung by Scott-Gatty himself in a concert at Doncaster Grammar School on 21 June 1870, long before they were published. He sang Three Little Pigs again in 1871 along with Camomile Tea, Tittle Tattle and The Yawning Song.

Scott-Gatty's most popular songs were the Plantation Songs (1893–1895) for baritone solo and mixed voice chorus. These included 24 songs in total, issued in four volumes. At that time such songs were novelties in the United Kingdom. The earliest recordings of Scott-Gatty date from December 1898 when the Georgia Glee Singers cut a version of Goodnight for the Gramophone Company, several other of the songs proved popular items with Melba in 1905 recording a version of the same song.

During the 1930s, long after Scott-Gatty's death, several of these were rearranged for baritone and male voice chorus by Leslie Woodgate and others had their accompaniments scored for orchestra by various hands. At least one of them, a duet, Good Night, was heard on 30 January 1891, years before it was published. It was performed in the Gattys' home territory in South Yorkshire, in a concert given in the surroundings of the Marble Saloon of Wentworth Woodhouse, near Rotherham, then the seat of Earl Fitzwilliam. It was sung by Scott-Gatty and his wife and the duet, according to a contemporary press report "caused a furore of enthusiasm."

Diabelleries is a set of variations by multiple composers on Scott-Gatty's tune “Where is my little basket gone”. It was put together in 1955 by Ralph Vaughan Williams as a tribute to Anne Macnaghten. Vaughan Williams set the theme, with subsequent variations composed by Howard Ferguson, Alan Bush, Alan Rawsthorne, Elizabeth Lutyens, Elizabeth Maconchy, Gerald Finzi, Grace Williams and Gordon Jacob. It was performed for the first time on 16 May 1955 in the Arts Council Drawing Room, but not recorded until 2016 (by the Cologne Chamber Soloists).

== Arms ==
Coat of arms of Alfred Scott-Gatty
Adopted Exemplified 1893 Crest (1) For Gatty: A fern-brake with a cock pheasant rising therefrom proper. (2) For Scott: On a mount vert a stag tripping proper, collared gemel argent & supporting with the dexter fore-leg a gold trident in bend sinister. Escutcheon Quarterly, (1 & 4) Per fess sable & azure, in chief a demi-cat guardant argent & in base 2 shin-bones in saltire between 4 fleurs de lis or (Gatty); (2 & 3) argent goutty sable, on a bend cotised azure a spur-rowel between 2 crescents argent (Scott). Motto Non Cate Sed Caute. 1 Gatti Sempre in Piedi Orders the circlet of the Royal Victorian Order as KCVO Badge A cat's face argent crowned with the circlet of a king of arms' crown (Granted 1906). Previous versions Previously a grant from 1876 contained only Gatty arms with a crest: on an embattled gateway a pheasant rising proper.

== Succession ==
Heraldic offices
Preceded by Sir William Henry Weldon	Rouge Dragon Pursuivant; 1880–1886	Succeeded by A.W. Woods
Preceded by John von Sonnentag de Havilland	York Herald; 1886–1904	Succeeded by George William Marshall
Preceded by Sir Albert William Woods	Garter King of Arms; 1904–1918	Succeeded by Sir Henry Farnham Burke

== See also ==
- Heraldry
- Pursuivant
- Herald
- King of Arms
