= Henry Farnham Burke =

Anglo-Irish genealogist and officer of arms (1859–1930)

Sir Henry Farnham Burke KCVO CB FSA

Garter Principal King of Arms
- In office 1919–1930
- Monarch: George V
- Preceded by: Sir Alfred Scott-Gatty
- Succeeded by: Sir Gerald Wollaston

Personal details
- Born: Henry Farnham Burke; 1859 London
- Died: 1930 (aged 70–71) Dublin
- Parent: Sir Bernard Burke
- Known for: Genealogical publications
- Website: burkespeerage.com

Sir Henry Farnham Burke, KCVO, CB, FSA (1859–1930) was a long-serving Anglo-Irish officer of arms at the College of Arms in London.

== Biography ==
A son of Sir Bernard Burke (who was Ulster King of Arms from 1853 until his death in 1892), Henry Burke was appointed Rouge Croix Pursuivant of Arms in Ordinary in 1880. In 1887, Burke was promoted to the office of Somerset Herald of Arms in Ordinary. On 26 October 1911, Burke was promoted to Norroy King of Arms to replace Sir William Henry Weldon. In that post he was responsible for the design of the Military Cross. In 1913 he was given the additional appointment of Genealogist of the Order of the Bath. On 22 January 1919, he was promoted to the office of Garter Principal King of Arms on the death of Sir Alfred Scott-Gatty. He held this office until his own death in 1930.

Burke was invested as a Commander of the Royal Victorian Order (CVO) by King Edward VII at Buckingham Palace on 11 August 1902, and was later promoted to become Knight Commander (KCVO) of the Order. He was awarded CB in the 1911 Coronation Honours.

== Arms ==
Coat of arms of Henry Farnham Burke
Crest A cat-a-mountain sejant gardant proper, collar & chain or, on the breast a cross or. Escutcheon Or, a cross gules with a lion sable in the first and fourth quarters. Motto Ung Roy, Ung Foy, Ung Loy ("One king, one faith, one law") Orders the circlet of the Royal Victorian Order as KCVO Symbolism After the arms of the House of de Burgh.

== Heraldic succession ==
Heraldic offices
Preceded by Stephen Isaacson Tucker	Rouge Croix Pursuivant; 1880–1887	Succeeded by George William Marshall
Preceded by Stephen Isaacson Tucker	Somerset Herald; 1887–1911	Succeeded by Everard Green
Preceded by Sir William Henry Weldon	Norroy King of Arms; 1911–1919	Succeeded by Charles Harold Athill
Preceded by Sir Alfred Scott Scott-Gatty	Garter King of Arms; 1919–1930	Succeeded by Sir Gerald Woods Wollaston

== See also ==
- Heraldry
- Pursuivant
- Herald
- King of Arms
- House of Burgh, an Anglo-Norman and Hiberno-Norman dynasty founded in 1193
- Earl of Clanricarde
- Clanricarde
