= Charles Henry Gatty =

British zoologist and meteorologist

Charles Henry Gatty FRSE FRAS FLS FGS FZS

Personal details
- Born: 6 March 1836 Marylebone, London, England
- Died: 12 December 1903 (aged 67)
- Occupation: Zoologist, meteorologist, landowner, philanthropist

Charles Henry Gatty (6 March 1836 – 12 December 1903) was a British zoologist, meteorologist, landowner and philanthropist. He was the last Lord of the manor in Felbridge, East Grinstead. He funded the Gatty Marine Laboratory in St Andrews in Scotland, which is named in his memory.

== Life ==
He was born on 6 March 1836 in Marylebone in London the son of George Gatty (d. 1862) and his wife Frances Sayer (d. 1876). His father was a clerk in the Central Chancery of the Orders of Knighthood. The family originated in Bodmin in Cornwall and before that were the Gatti family of Insubria in Italy. In 1838 he moved with his family to Malling House in South Malling near Lewes. In 1846 they moved to 6 Marlborough Terrace in Kensington. At the same time they ran Crowhurst Park, 120 acres previously owned by the Pelham family. Charles was sent to Eton College then won a place at Cambridge University. He did not graduate until 1862.

In 1854 his eldest brother George Edward Gatty, pursuing a military career, died of illness aged only 22, and Charles Henry then became heir the family estates. He acquired these in 1862 on the death of his father. This included the Felbridge Estate extending to 1740 acres, which had been purchased in 1855. In 1864 his father paid for the building of a new parish church in Felbridge to replace the dilapidated Evelyn Chapel in the grounds of his manor house. Now vastly rich, Charles indulged his interests of botany, with a special interest in marine zoology.

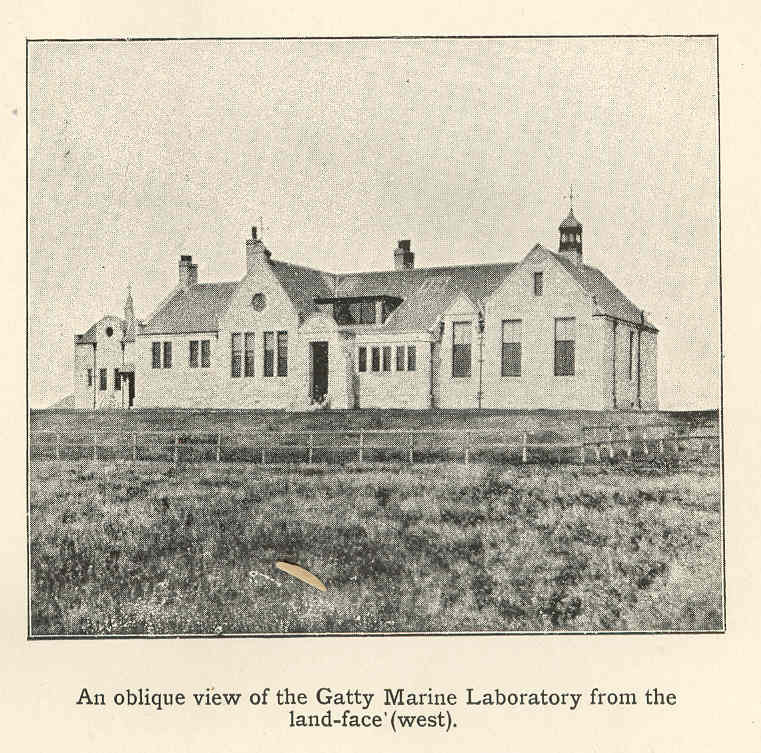
Gatty Marine Laboratory c.1900

In 1894 he was elected a Fellow of the Royal Society of Edinburgh. His proposers were William Carmichael McIntosh, Sir James Donaldson, Alexander Crum Brown, and Ramsay Heatley Traquair.

In 1892, he gave £3000 for the foundation of the Gatty Marine Laboratory to continue his interests. This moved from a timber building to a permanent building in 1896. It is located near St Andrews in Fife. Its first Director was William Carmichael McIntosh. Gatty visited his creation at least once per year. As the facility was linked to St Andrews University they awarded him an honorary doctorate (LLD) in recognition of his generosity. He was also granted the Freedom of the City. Earlier philanthropic gifts included the rebuilding of the Cottage Hospital in East Grinstead in 1881. In 1894 he gifted a large section of river bank to the town. Gatty also supplied free housing to retired persons in Felbridge. In 1892 he paid the costs for a trip to America of an estate worker and his wife, hoping it would improve his health.

Following his death on 12 December 1903 his estate at Felbridge the manor was broken up: the village losts its feudal superiority and the manor house was auctioned off in 1911. Each worker on his estate received a full extra year's wage within his will.

Charles is buried in the family vault of Felbridge Parish Church. The stained glass in the east window is dedicated to his memory.

== Family ==
Gatty never married; he shared much time with his older second cousin, Margaret Gatty, inspiring her to publish a book on British Seaweeds in 1863.
