= Alfred Gatty =

English Anglican priest and author (1813–1903)

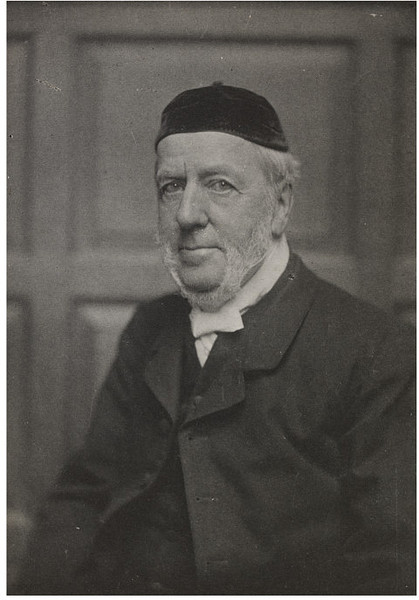
Alfred Gatty, 1884

Alfred Gatty (18 April 1813 – 20 January 1903) was a Church of England vicar and author.

He was born in London to Robert Gatty, a solicitor, and Margaret Jones, and was educated first at Charterhouse and then at Eton College. In 1831 he entered Exeter College, Oxford, graduating in 1836. He was ordained a deacon in 1837 and was appointed as curate of Bellerby in the North Riding of Yorkshire. He was ordained priest in 1838, and was appointed vicar of Ecclesfield on 23 September 1839, a position he held until his death. In 1861 he was appointed as rural dean and in 1862 as subdean of York Minster.

Gatty received the degree Doctor of Divinity (DD).

On 8 July 1839 he married Margaret Scott, daughter of Rev. Dr. Scott, a chaplain to Lord Nelson. They had ten children (though two died in infancy), including the judge Stephen Herbert Gatty, the author Juliana Horatia Ewing, antiquary, author and lecturer Charles Tindal Gatty and the officer of arms and composer Alfred Scott-Gatty. Margaret died in 1873, and in 1884 Alfred Gatty married Mary Newman.

He died at Ecclesfield on 20 January 1903, in his 90th year.

== Publications ==
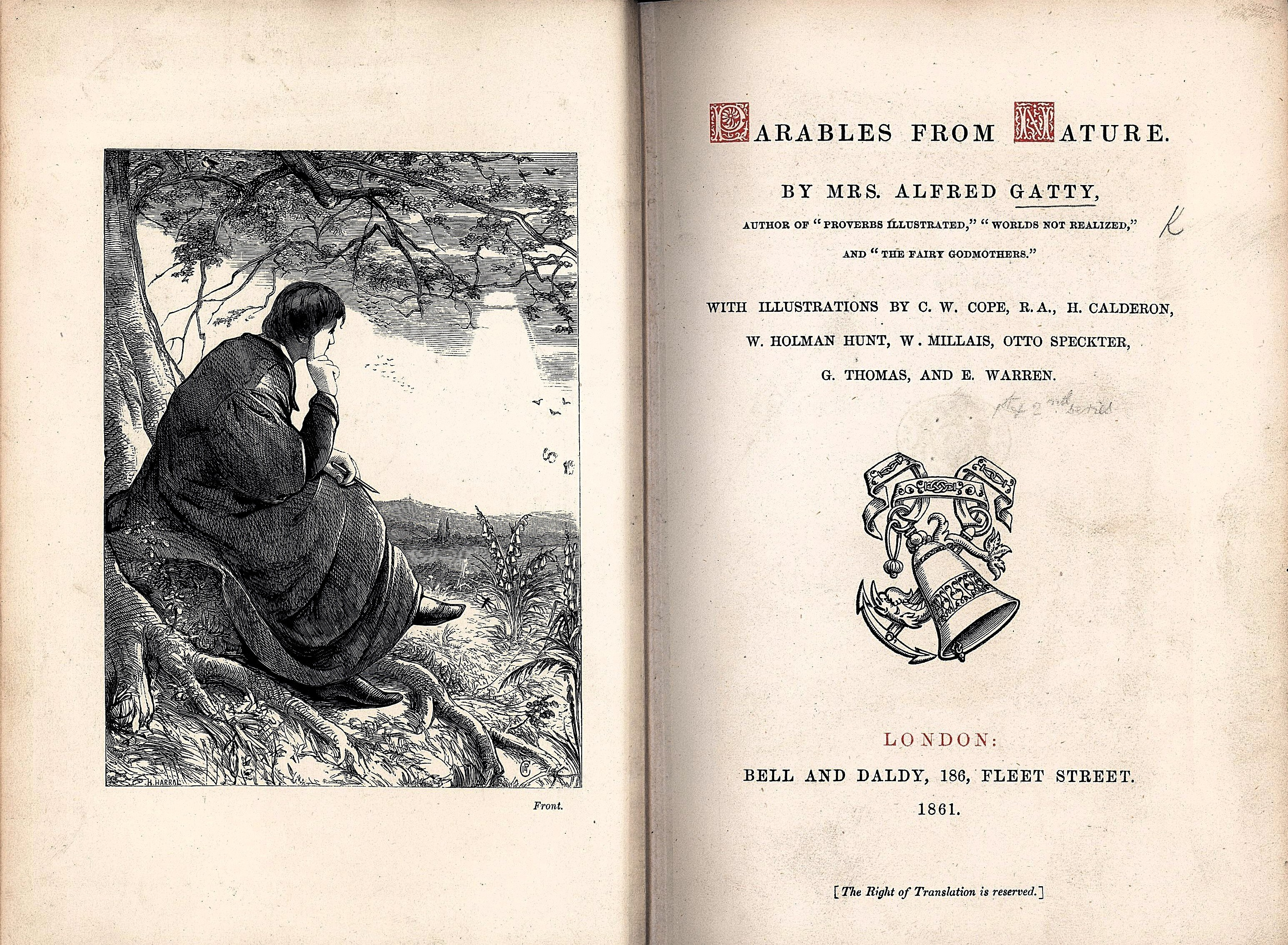
Mrs Alfred Gatty. Parables from Nature. 1861

With Margaret Gatty:

- 1842—Recollections of the Life of the Rev. A. J. Scott, DD, Lord Nelson's Chaplain
- 1860—Travels and Adventures of the Rev. Joseph Wolff
- 1861—The Old Folks from Home
- 1872—The Book of Sundials

As sole author:

- 1848—The Bell: its Origin, History, and Uses
- 1881—Key to Tennyson's 'In Memoriam'
- 1873—Sheffield, Past and Present
- 1884—A Life at One Living

In 1869 he published an enlarged edition of Joseph Hunter's Hallamshire.
