= Margaret Gatty =

British writer and marine biologist (1809–1873)

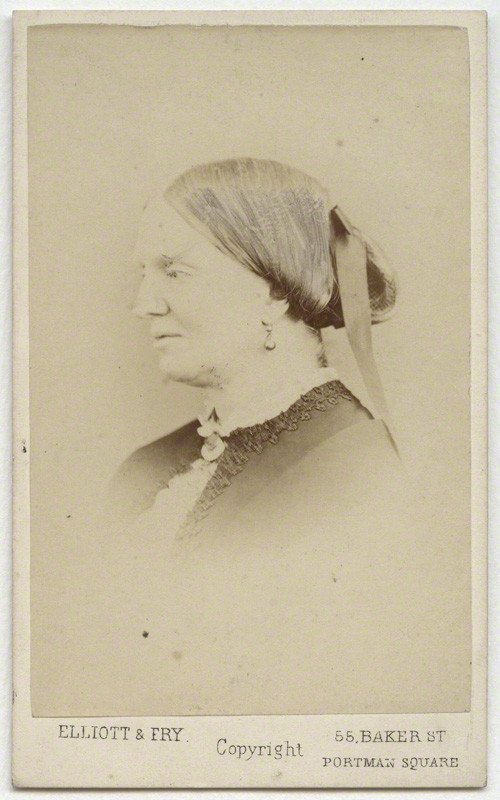
- Gatty in the 1860s
- Born: Margaret Scott; 3 June 1809; Burnham on Crouch, England
- Died: 4 October 1873 (aged 64); Ecclesfield, South Yorkshire, England
- Other name: Margaret Scott
- Known for: children's books; marine biology
- Spouse: Rev Alfred Gatty
- Children: Horatia Katherine Francis Gatty; Juliana Horatia Ewing; Charles Tindal Gatty; Alfred Scott-Gatty
- Parent(s): Rev. Alexander John and Mary Frances (née Ryder) Scott

Margaret Gatty (née Scott; 3 June 1809 – 4 October 1873) was an English children's author and writer on marine biology. In some writings she argues against Charles Darwin's Origin of Species. She became a popular writer of tales for young people, which she hoped would influence adult minds as well. Among her other books are Parables from Nature, Worlds not Realized, Proverbs Illustrated, and Aunt Judy's Tales. She edited Aunt Judy's Magazine, a family publication written by various family members.

== Science ==
Gatty became fascinated by marine biology through contact with a second cousin, Charles Henry Gatty, a Royal Society member. There may also have been influence from William Henry Harvey, whom she met while convalescing in Hastings in 1848. She corresponded with many great marine biologists of her day including George Johnston, George Busk and Robert Brown. She wrote British Sea Weeds, a book that was more accessible than previous ones on the subject. This illustrated book, published in 1872, was the outcome of 14 years' work and described 200 species. It continued to be used into the 1950s.

Gatty's other collecting and scientific interests included sundials, which led to an 1872 book on 350 of them, focusing on their artistry and literary nature rather than their astronomical aspects, although it discussed historical developments. The coverage of sundials on mainland Europe and some illustrations were major contributions from a friend, Eleanor Lloyd.

The standard author abbreviation Gatty is used to indicate this person as the author when citing a botanical name.

== Children's literature ==
While many see her interests in literature and science as independent, she used the combination of children's literature and scientific curiosity as a way to argue against Charles Darwin's Origin of Species.

Primarily in Parables from Nature, Gatty could preach to children in a way they enjoyed, in which God and nature were treated concurrently. The publication of the Parables coincided with the evolutionary theories, so that her writing influenced children's attitudes towards science. It tended to have a strong moral tone, and often used religion and God to influence their upbringing.

Victorian children's literature at the time was designed to teach children lessons and morals rather than capture their attention. Gatty's increased use of illustrations and folk and fairy tales meant children enjoyed reading her more.

== Selected works ==
Her fiction for children includes:

- The Fairy Godmothers and Other Tales (London: George Bell, 1851) – four stories dedicated "To My Children" Gatty was paid in marine botany books for this.
- Parables from Nature (1855 to 1871) – "First Series", "Second Series", etc.
- Legendary Tales, illustrated by Phiz (Bell and Daldy, 1858)
- Aunt Judy's Tales (1859)
- Aunt Judy's Letters, illustrated by Clara S. Lane (Bell and Daldy, 1862) – sequel to Tales

She also authored, collaborated and translated academic works:

- Recollections of the Life of the Rev. A. J. Scott D.D., Lord Nelson's chaplain (1842) Saunders and Otley, London
- Travels and Adventures of the Rev. Joseph Wolff (1861) Saunders, Otley and Co., London. She and her daughters collaborated with Joseph Wolff to write his autobiography.
- The History of a Mouthful of Bread (1864), translated from the eighth edition of the work by Jean Macé
- The Book of Sun-Dials (1872) Bell and Daldy, York Street, Covent Garden, London. Illustrated
- British Sea Weeds (1872) Bell and Daldy, York Street, Covent Garden, London. Illustrated

== Personal life ==
Gatty was born in Burnham on Crouch, Essex, the daughter of Mary Frances (née Ryder) and the Rev. Alexander John Scott. Her father was a linguist, scholar and Royal Navy chaplain who served under Lord Nelson. Her mother died when she was young and Gatty took on a caring role in a family consisting of her father, grandfather and younger sister Horatia. She and her sister were educated at home, learning Italian and German, painting and writing poetry. Her poetry was encouraged by Margaret Holford but after a rejection by Blackwood's Magazine she did not pursue this further.

The family knew a local curate Rev. Alfred Gatty, D.D. from 1837. She married him on 8 July 1839 at St Giles in the Fields, Holborn, Camden (after overcoming her father's objections), and moved into the vicarage of the Church of St Mary, Ecclesfield near Sheffield, shortly after, on the recommendation of her uncle. She lived there for the rest of her life. They had eight children. In 1848 she was introduced to collecting marine algae while in Hastings recovering from a breakdown. Her husband died in 1903.

Gatty was the mother of Juliana Horatia Ewing, also a writer of children's books, of the musician and author Charles Tindal Gatty, of the judge Sir Stephen Herbert Gatty, and of Alfred Scott-Gatty who served as Garter Principal King of Arms. Her daughter Horatia Eden shared her interest in marine biology, inherited her mother's collections and added to them herself especially marine invertebrates.

Gatty suffered from ill health for much of her life, possibly from undiagnosed multiple sclerosis. Her frequent illnesses brought close friendship with Dr George Johnston, who was noted for advocating pain-relieving medication. He advised her to use chloroform in childbirth and in 1851 Gatty became the first woman in Sheffield to do so. She died at home on 4 October 1873 and was buried in Ecclesfield churchyard.

== Legacy ==
A marble tablet was installed in the north side of the nave of the Church of St Mary, Ecclesfield, in memory of her. It indicates that it was subscribed by more than a 1,000 children "as a token of gratitude for the many books she wrote for them". There is also a stained glass window in the chancel that was installed in her memory. It includes a representation of her as well as of the Sermon on the Mount and several parables.

Gatty amassed a large collection of marine material, gathered by herself and by correspondents in far corners of the British Empire as well as the UK.

This was donated to two places by her daughter, Horatia Katherine Francis Eden (née Gatty). Weston Park Museum received part of the collection of seaweed and sponges assembled by both Gatty and her daughter. These were donated in several parts between 1877 and 1909. It comprises 350 items including both folio albums and individual specimens.

In April 1907 part of Margaret Gatty's herbarium was donated by her daughter to the Gatty Marine Laboratory in St Andrews and later incorporated into the St Andrews University Herbarium in the Department of Botany. Starting in 1947 these specimens were partly described by Helen Blackler. More recently the herbarium was moved to the St Andrews Botanic Garden. The laboratory was named after its benefactor Charles Henry Gatty (1836–1903), a distant cousin of Gatty's husband. A total of 8,825 specimens and 500 plates exist currently at St Andrews, many in their original albums.

Several species of seaweed were named after her, including the Australian monospecific genus Gattya pinnella.
