= Parkin Jeffcock =

English mining engineer

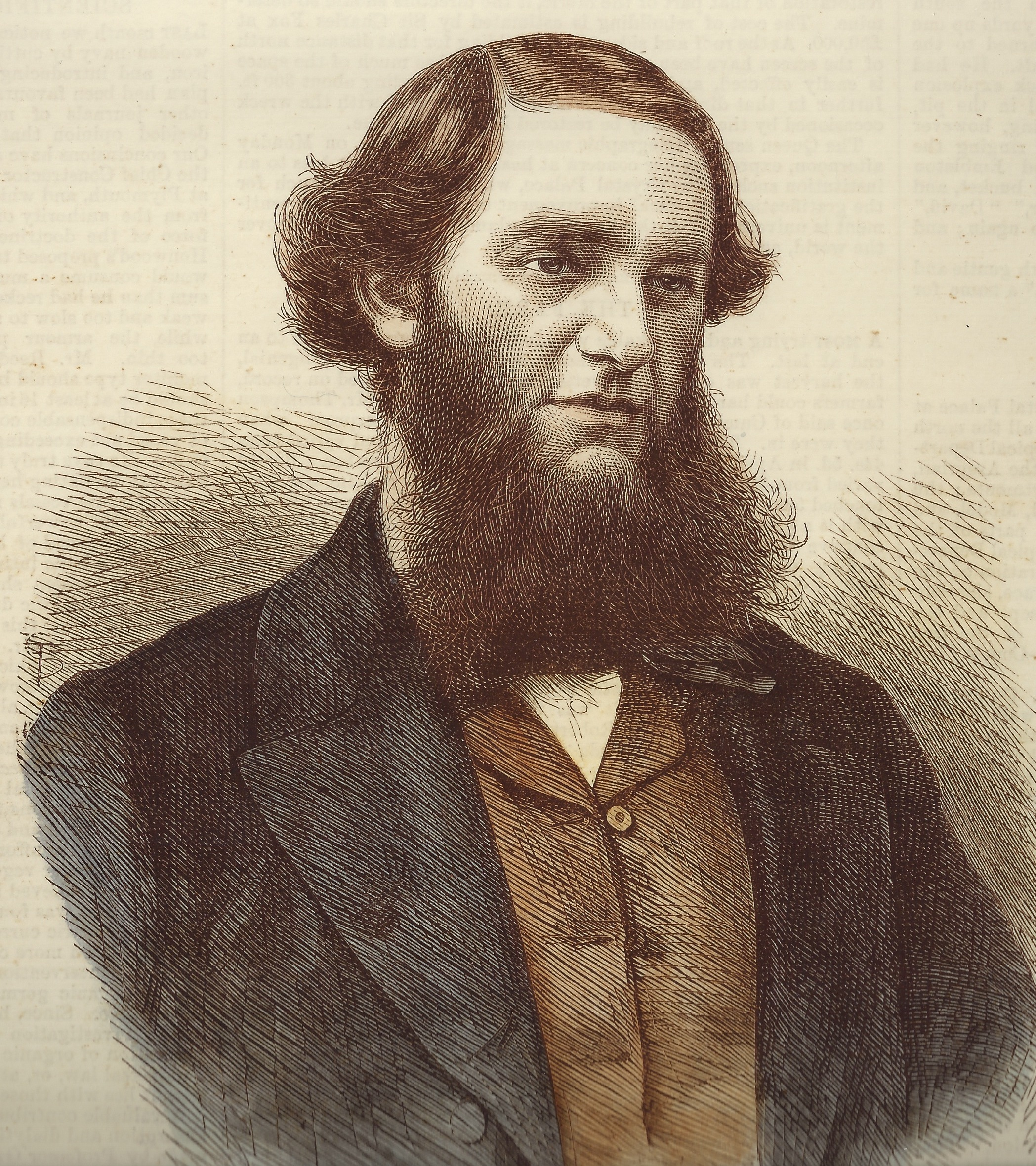
- Portrait of Jeffcock published in The Illustrated London News in 1867
- Born: 27 October 1829; Ecclesfield, Sheffield
- Died: 13 December 1866 (aged 37); Oaks explosion, near Barnsley
- Education: College of Civil Engineers, Putney
- Occupation: Mining Engineer
- Parent(s): John and Catherine Jeffcock

Parkin Jeffcock (27 October 1829 – 13 December 1866) was an English mining engineer who died trying to effect the rescue of miners during the Oaks mining disaster which eventually killed more than 350 people.

== Biography ==
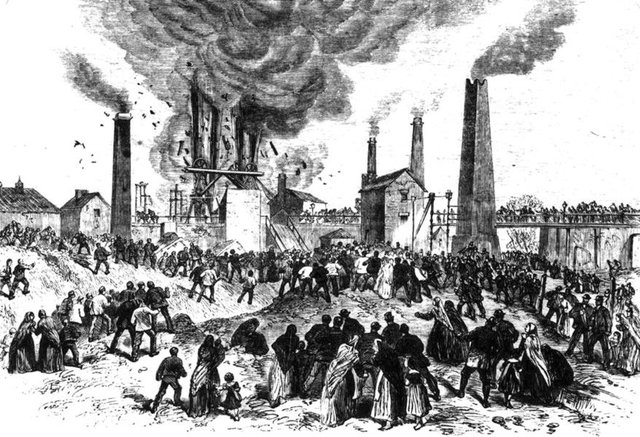
An artist's impression of the Oaks Colliery explosion

Parkin was born on 27 October 1829 at Cowley Manor in Ecclesfield in the West Riding of Yorkshire, now a part of Sheffield. He was the son of John Jeffcock J.P. (1803–78) and his wife Catherine (1804–72, née Parkin) Lady of the Manor of Darley. He intended to go to Oriel College, Oxford and then enter holy orders but instead entered a college for civil engineers at Putney, which under the presidency of the Duke of Cambridge and the principalship of the Rev. B.M. Cowrie, was doing good work for that profession. In 1850, after training at the College for Civil Engineers, he was articled to George Hunter, a colliery viewer and engineer from Durham. He made rapid progress in his profession, and in 1857 became a partner of J.T. Woodhouse, a mining engineer and agent based in Derby. He moved to Duffield, a town just north of Derby in 1860.

In 1861, his bravery was noted when he attempted to rescue the men and boys trapped in a coal-pit at Clay Cross during an inundation. In 1863, and again in 1864, he examined and reported on the Moselle coalfield, near Saarbrücken. He delivered a paper on the local coalfields to the Institute of Mechanical Engineers in Birmingham. He became a member of his local church, started a horticultural society and became a church warden. Until 1862, when he resigned his commission, he was a Lieutenant in the First West Yorkshire Yeomanry Cavalry.

On 12 December 1866, while at his house at Duffield, he learned that the Oaks Pit, near Barnsley, was on fire. With three others, including Mr Smith, an engineer and David Tewart, the steward of the colliery, he descended to make an exploration of the workings. They were one of the last parties to venture into the pit; previous volunteers had been lost or had abandoned their rescue attempts. One of the party returned to the surface to send down volunteers, but Jeffcock remained below directing the rescue attempts.

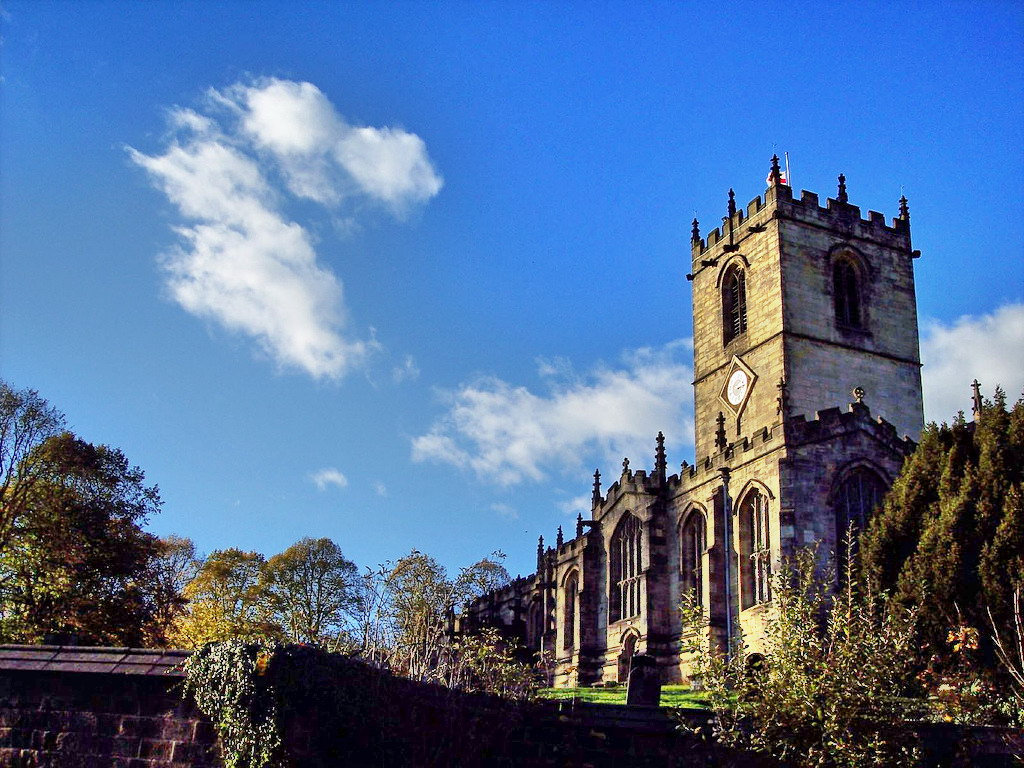
Parkin Jeffcock's body was buried at St Mary, Ecclesfield Church after 10 months entombed in the Oaks Colliery mine

Before help arrived on the morning of 13 December, a second explosion killed Jeffcock and all but one of the 30 volunteers who were still underground. The sole survivor was rescued on 14 December 1866 by Thomas William Embleton and John Edward Mannatt. In all 361 people died, including 29 rescuers. The pit was sealed. Jeffcock's body was not recovered until 5 October 1867, when it was buried at the Church of St. Mary, Ecclesfield.

== Legacy ==
St Saviour's Church was built as a memorial to Jeffcock at Mortomley, near Sheffield. It was completed in 1872. A (c. 4.5 m) memorial on Doncaster Road in Barnsley was built in 1913 to commemorate the bravery and sacrifice of Jeffcock and the other rescuers.

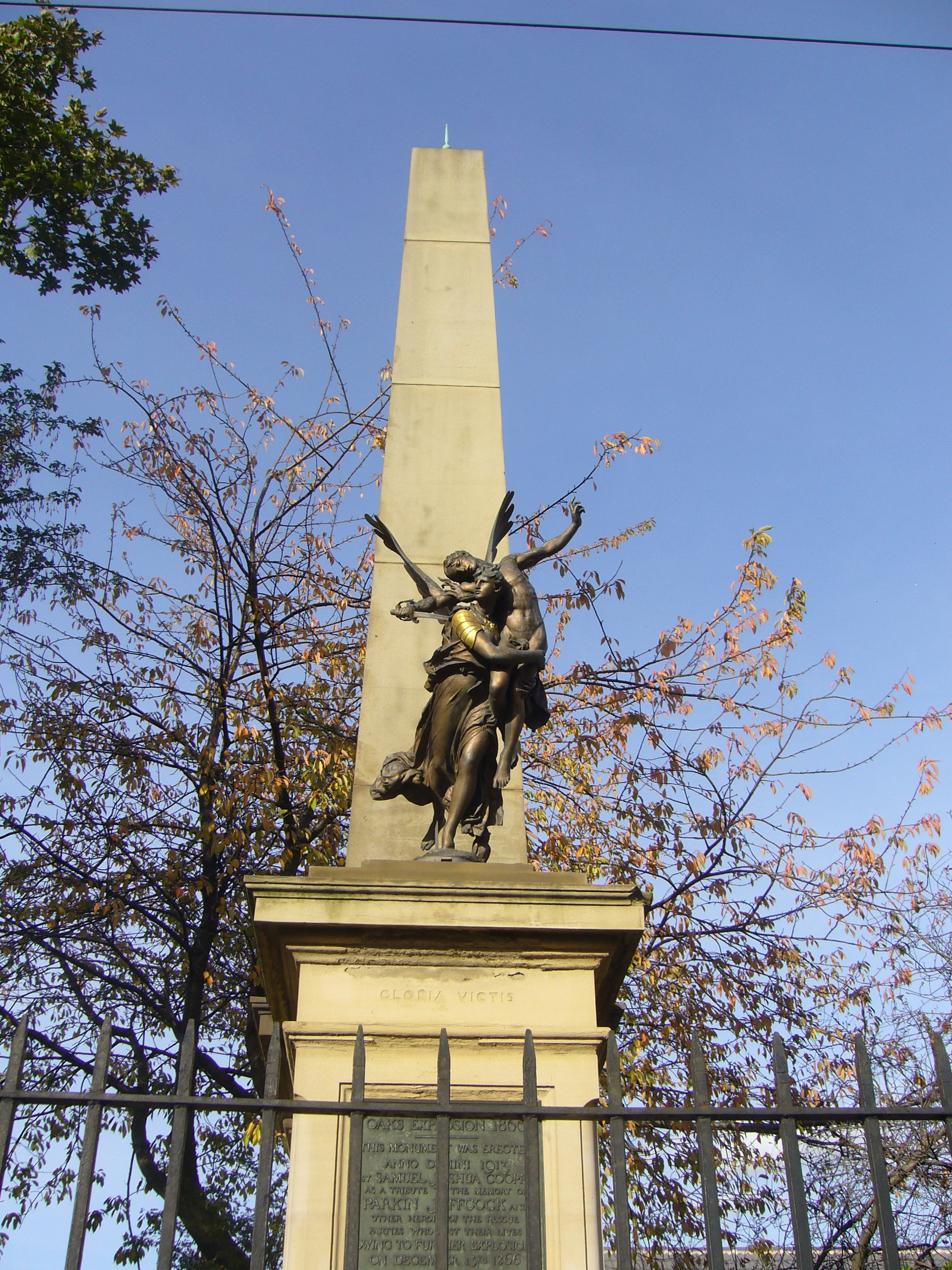
Monument erected by Samuel J Cooper in memory of the heroes of rescue parties after the Oaks Colliery explosion

== Family ==
Not only were his father and grandfather colliery owners and engineers but so were his three uncles Thomas William Jeffcock, J.P., D.L., Thomas Dunn Jeffcock (an original member of the Yorkshire Geological Polytechnic Society) and William Jeffcock J.P. the first mayor of Sheffield.

== Publications ==
"On the coal and iron mining of South Yorkshire", presented to the Institute of Mechanical Engineers. He noted that the collieries used large steam driven fans that had worked successfully for many years.
