= James Munro Dodd =

Professor James Munro Dodd FRS FRSE FZS

Professor of Zoology, University College of North Wales
- In office 1968–1981

Professor of Zoology, University of Leeds
- In office 1960–1968

Personal details
- Born: 26 May 1915 Manchester, England
- Died: 15 December 1986 (aged 71) Bangor, Gwynedd, Wales
- Occupation: Marine biologist

James Munro Dodd (26 May 1915 – 15 December 1986) was a British marine biologist. He was Emeritus Professor of Zoology at the University College of North Wales in Bangor. He was generally known as Jimmie Dodd. He specialised in Comparative Endocrinology within the field of zoology.

In 1982 he was the winner of the Frink Medal, awarded by the Zoological Society of London.

== Life ==
He was born in Manchester on 26 May 1915. He was educated at Whitehouse School in Brampton. He went to Liverpool University gaining a BSc in 1937 and Diploma in Education in 1938. He then began working as a Biology Master at Cardigan Grammar School.

In the Second World War he served as a Navigator in Transport Command with the RAF. Following the war he joined the Gatty Marine Laboratory linked to St Andrews University in Scotland. Here he rose to the level of Director and then in 1960 was given the Chair in Zoology at Leeds University, based at the laboratory at Robin Hood's Bay. Finally in 1968 he moved to the University of North Wales again as Professor of Zoology.

St Andrews University awarded him an honorary doctorate (PhD) in 1953. In 1957 he was elected a Fellow of the Royal Society of Edinburgh. His proposers were David Raitt Robertson Burt, James Ritchie, Sir Maurice Yonge, and Harold Callan.

In 1975 he was elected a Fellow of the Royal Society of London.

He died of bone cancer in hospital in Bangor, Wales on 15 December 1986.

== Family ==
He married Margaret Helen Ingram Macaulay in 1951.
