= Charles Tindal Gatty =

British antiquarian, musician and author (1851–1928)

Charles T. Gatty FSA
- Born: Charles Tindal Gatty; 14 November 1851; Bedale, North Yorkshire
- Died: 8 June 1928 (aged 76); London
- Resting place: St Mary's Church, Eccleston, Cheshire, England
- Known for: Antiquary; musician; author; lecturer
- Notable work: Mary Davies and the Manor of Ebury (2 Volumes)

Charles Tindal Gatty FSA (14 November 1851 – 8 June 1928) was a British antiquary, musician, author, and lecturer.

== Personal life ==
Charles Tindal Gatty was the son of the Rev. Alfred Gatty, D.D. vicar of Ecclesfield; his mother, Margaret Gatty, was the daughter of the Rev. Alexander John Scott a chaplain in the Royal Navy who served under and was a friend of Lord Nelson on board HMS Victory during the Battle of Trafalgar." Charles Tindal Gatty was educated at the Charterhouse School until he was 13 and from then on by a private tutor. Gatty converted to Catholicism and became a well known political spokesman for his adopted faith.

== Early career ==
Gatty was appointed Curator at the Mayer Museum in Liverpool, where he worked from 1873 until 1885. During his time at the Museum he worked on a catalogue of the Mayer collection, which had been presented in 1867 by Joseph Mayer (antiquary). In 1875 Gatty became a member of the Historic Society of Lancashire and Cheshire, in 1881-2, he was the Hon. Secretary, whilst Mayer is listed as one of the Vice-Presidents alongside John Ruskin. He was next, for two years, private secretary to Catholic convert John Crichton-Stuart, 3rd Marquess of Bute. In April 1887 Gatty moved to Yeovil where he became editor of the Western Chronicle (a newspaper with Liberal interests started by Lord Wolverton).

== Controversies ==
While working as an editor in Yeovil Gatty convinced the Bishop to allow the celebration of Mass to resume in the town. The first Mass celebrated in Yeovil since the Reformation 350 years previously was held on Sunday 13 November 1887 in Gatty's drawing room at 137 Hendford Hill. It had taken six months to convert the room into a chapel and 16 people attended. The congregation quickly grew and by 24 June Gatty was renting a pre-Reformation Chantry in the town centre. A year later religious intolerance led to a "great and bitter" anti-Catholic demonstration at the Town Hall; following this the Chantry windows were broken and the Carmelite Fathers were intimidated by "the rough element". Gatty used the Western Chronicle as a platform for debate and also published a 50-page pamphlet to explain "what the Church really is" and "what she teaches". His opponents included author and publisher Sampson Low who wrote a book aimed at Gatty and defending the English Church. Gatty's opponents refused to openly debate with him at the Town Hall and eventually religious discord in the town abated.

In the 1892 General Election Gatty ran for parliament as a Home Rule candidate, as the nominee for the West Dorset riding. In March that year his opponent Henry Richard Farquharson began a 'drirty tricks' campaign and told St John Brodrick in the House of Commons that Gatty had been expelled from Charterhouse aged 13. Brodderick repeated this to Conservative politician George Wyndham, a close friend of Gatty's, who immediately informed him. Gatty sued Farquarson for libel and slander. During the course of the trial it emerged that Gatty had been the victim of bullying and abuse at the hands of older boys that "went on " at public schools. His father the Rev. Gatty called the slander "an infamous lie" and confirmed he had removed his son from the school and " sent him to a private tutor". The Lord Chief Justice said Gatty had been "dragged to the stake" for something that had happened "30 years ago". Farquarson was ordered to pay £5,000 damages, reduced on appeal to £2,500 a year later. The jury reached their decision "without leaving the box" and the verdict "was received with applause"

== The Irish Art Companions ==
Shortly after the trial Gatty served as secretary to the Chief Ministerial Whip, T. E. Ellis. Between 1898 and 1905 Gatty was joint editor, with the Henry Fitzalan-Howard, 15th Duke of Norfolk, of the hymnal Arundel Hymns, to which Pope Leo XIII contributed a preface in form of a personal letter. When George Wyndham served as Chief Secretary for Ireland between November 1900 and March 1905, art dealer and collector Hugh Lane corresponded with Gatty about meeting with Wyndham; Gatty's reply in 1903 "advising patience" survives. That same year Gatty was invited by Wyndham to stay at the Chief Secretary's Lodge.

In 1904 he returned to Dublin and founded the Irish Art Companions with the involvement of the wealthy Irish American nationalist Thomas Hughes Kelly. The Irish Art Companions was run by Gatty, a member of the Conradh na Gaeilge (Gaelic League) that sponsored the 'Industrial Conference' in November 1905, at which Gatty delivered a speech on 'Industrial Development'. The Art Companions aligned themselves with the cultural nationalism of the League and played an active part in the artistic life of Dublin, in 1906 Gatty stated that the Art Companions wanted "a re-evaluation of this country in the estimation of its own children". On 4 May 1906 he gave a lecture at Westminster Hall on "the revival of sacred and other Arts in Ireland".

The Art Companions opened a sales depot to store and exhibit works in adjoining 18th Century houses at 27–28 Clare Street, not far from the School of Art; the building also housed a plaster mill. By 1907 this was described as "a manufactory, technical college, art school and shop all in one". Between 4 May and 9 November 1907 members of the Irish Arts Companions exhibited at the Irish International Exhibition. A branch was then opened in London in 1908, which was managed by Charles H Cochrane.

Among those associated with the Art Companions were the Irish republican sculptor Willie Pearse, sculptor and portrait painter Lilla Vanston, sculptor, medallist Gwendolen Herbert and sculptor, painter Mervyn Lawrence whose work was owned by Lady Fingal Elizabeth Burke-Plunkett who knew Gatty and was an activist in Irish industrial, cultural and charitable groups.

A factory was also set up at Ringsend to manufacture plaster from Irish gypsum. The Art Companions also helped provide an alternative to imported ecclesiastical statues. A letter exists from the Irish Art Companions to Patrick Pearse dated 7 March 1910 asking him to "give bearer cheque as promised". The letter is written on headed paper : Irish Art Companions Everything Sold in this Shop has been made in Ireland by Irish hands.

The Irish Art Companions also sold clothing and advertised 'Irish Costume Material' on the front page of Bean na hÉireann (The Women of Ireland) a magazine run by the Inghinidhe na hÉireann the Irish radical women's movement founded by Maud Gonne; and in January 1912 in the An Claidheamh Soluis an advert promoting "Irish Linens, Dress Materials, Colleen Cloaks and Underwear".

== Later life ==
In 1913, George Wyndham died suddenly and Gatty wrote a warm and moving tribute to his friend, George Wyndham, Recognita published in 1917 which gives an account of their shared interests and time spent at Clouds House as well as in Ireland and elsewhere.

In 1921, Gatty published the two-volume work Mary Davies and the Manor of Ebury.

== Death ==
Gatty died on 8 June 1928 in a London Nursing Home and was buried at St. Mary's Church, Eccleston Cheshire. The day before his burial a requiem Mass was celebrated at St James's, Spanish Place. His obituary stated "By his death there is removed a cultured and interesting personality, a man with a great number of friends both in this country, and in Ireland" Among the bequests in his will was "a framed page of fourteenth-century Liturgical MS. "given me by John Ruskin".

== Publications ==
- With Norfolk, Henry FitzAlan-Howard, 15th Duke of, 1847–1917 – Arundel hymns : and other spiritual praises / chosen and edited by Henry Duke of Norfolk and Charles T. Gatty. Arundel hymns: and other spiritual praises

Professional and academic associations
Preceded by David Buxton	Secretary of the Historic Society of Lancashire and Cheshire; 1877–84	Succeeded by Edward W. M. Hance
