= Oaks explosion =

1866 British mining disaster

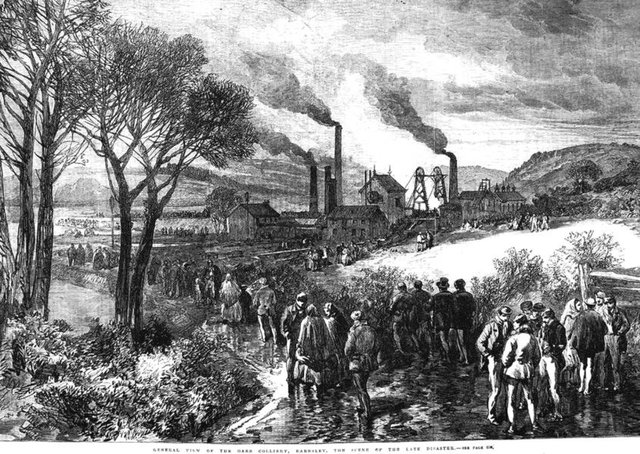
- General view of the colliery, the scene of the disaster, The Illustrated London News
- Date: 12 December 1866
- Time: 13:15
- Location: Hoyle Mill, Barnsley, Yorkshire, England.; 53.5529°N 1.4513°W
- Type: Coal mine disaster
- Cause: Explosions
- Deaths: 361, including 27 rescuers

The Oaks explosion, which happened at a coal mine in South Yorkshire on 12 December 1866, remains the worst mining disaster in England. A series of explosions caused by firedamp ripped through the underground workings at the Oaks Colliery at Hoyle Mill near Stairfoot in Barnsley killing 361 miners and rescuers. It was the worst mining disaster in the United Kingdom until the 1913 Senghenydd explosion in Wales.

== Oaks Colliery ==
The first shaft at the Oaks Colliery was sunk in the early 1830s. In 1845 two separate explosions occurred at the colliery. On both occasions few men were below ground and no more than three or four workers died. Two years later a more serious incident occurred after firedamp, which had accumulated in old workings, was ignited and exploded. Of the men underground, 73 were killed and 26 were rescued. Changes were then made to the colliery's ventilation. The downcast shaft (Note: Upcast and downcast refer to the direction in which air travels. Air is drawn down the downcast shaft, through the workings and exhausts through the upcast shaft. To force air through the underground workings, fans are used but at this date, ventilation was by induced draught from a furnace at the bottom of a shaft.) was converted to upcast with a furnace at its foot. Two abandoned shafts were deepened to the lower seams and brought into use as the downcast and drawing shafts. The upcast shaft was close to the Dearne and Dove Canal and the downcast shafts were adjacent to the railway.

The colliery covered about 450 acres (180 ha), of which two-thirds had been worked out. It was worked on the longwall principle, there being about 60 miles (97 km) of wall at the time of the 1866 explosion. The Barnsley seam is about 8 feet (2.4 m) thick. It is 280 yards (260 m) below the surface at the pit bottom, but dips significantly, so that it reaches 400 yards (370 m). The Barnsley seam tended to experience outbursts of firedamp, and they were sometimes powerful enough to extinguish the Geordie lamps that were used at the time. On one occasion all the lamps for 1,500 yards (1,400 m) were extinguished. Gas built up in the uneven levels, and the goaves (Note: Void from where the coal had been extracted) were full of firedamp. The air circuit was more than 3 miles (4.8 km) long. The induced draught was obtained from a pair of furnaces 70 yards (64 m) from the upcast shaft.

At the inquiry after the explosion, it was pointed out that the colliery had not been visited by government inspectors for some years.

The Oaks Colliery workings became part of Barnsley Main Colliery, which closed and re-opened several times between 1929 and 1966. Linked underground to Barrow Colliery, the No.2 shaft was used for man-riding in the 1970s. Production at Barnsley Main ceased in 1991. The colliery's winding engine house and pit-head structures are Grade II listed buildings. They are a rare survival of winding-shaft structures modernised in the 1950s by the National Coal Board, and their presence preserves a historical connection to past disasters.

== Context ==
The Oaks was considered to be one of the most dangerous pits in South Yorkshire and the workers were concerned for their own safety. Large emissions of firedamp were commonplace. Ten years earlier the 400-strong workforce had gone on strike for ten weeks because of alleged management incompetence, but had to resume work when starvation loomed. During a bitter dispute in 1864, blackleg labour was used, and striking miners and their families were evicted from their homes. Gas made men giddy and faint. (Note: Modern research suggests this would be due to oxygen deprivation rather than methane poisoning.) Men would not take safety lamps near the goaves. According to Tomlinson, the underviewers (Note: junior managers or foremen) had written the word "Fire" in chalk in certain places. Parkin Jeffcock, the mining engineer who attended after the explosion, agreed that the fireman (Note: In this context a fireman tests for gas before the shift and if required will fire it in a controlled manner) had written "Fire" but said that this was not unusual.

In a meeting with the management at the beginning of December, the workers complained about an inadequacy in the pit's ventilation. To improve the ventilation and alleviate the problem of gas issuing from the seam, a drift through the rock was blasted from near the pit bottom towards the more remote workings. The drift was expected to be finished that day.

A critical aspect to the science of firedamp explosions is the afterdamp, the aftermath mix of gases, which can be equally dangerous, if not more so.

== Explosion ==
On Wednesday 12 December 1866, 340 men and boys were underground, 131 hewers who cut the coal, hurriers who moved the coal to the shaft bottom, horse-drivers, maintenance staff and trappers, boys who were employed to open and close ventilation doors to allow wagons to pass.

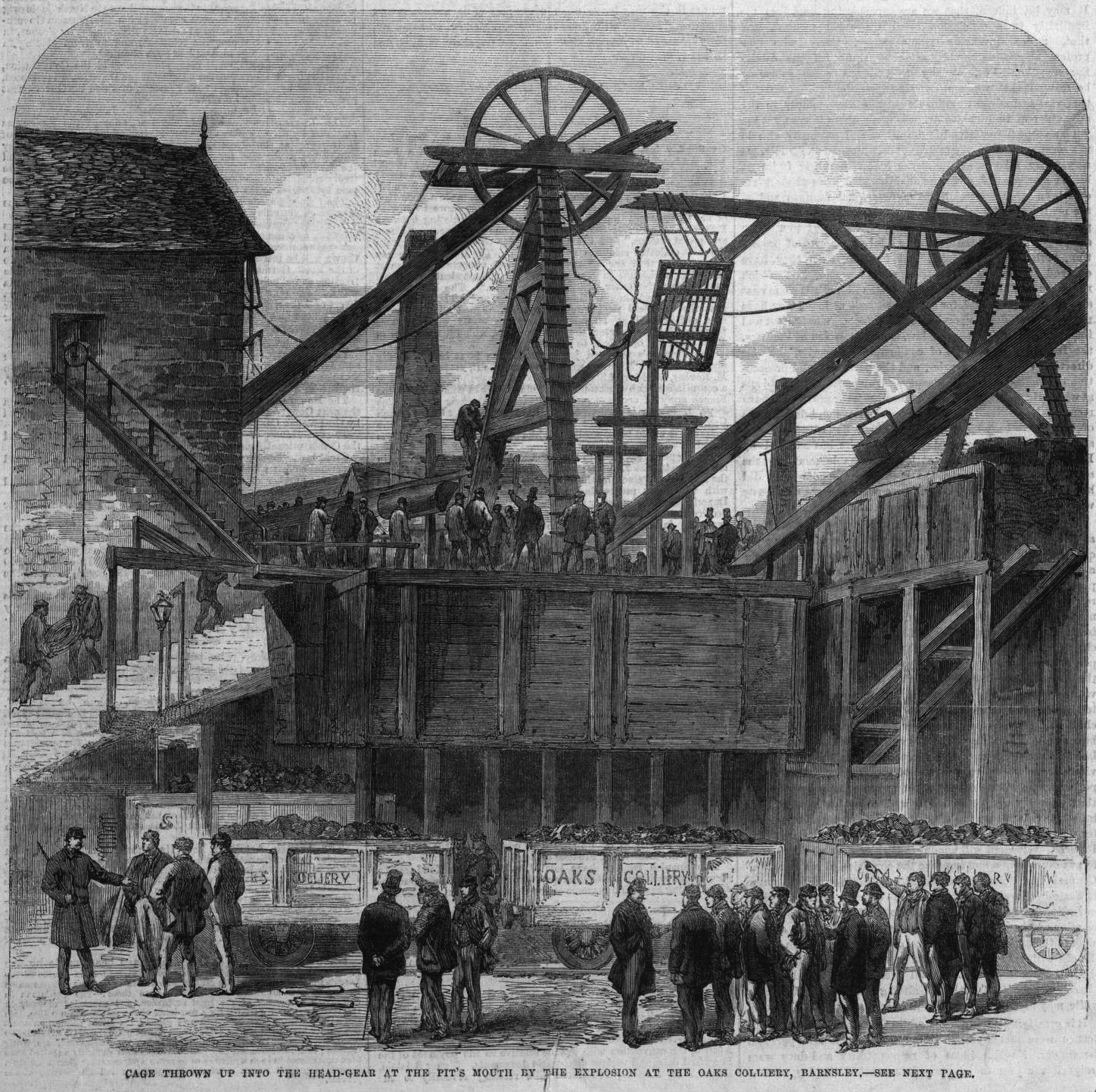
Cage thrown up into the Head-Gear at the Pit's Mouth by the Explosion, Illustrated London News

At 1:20 pm with less than an hour of the shift remaining, an explosion ripped through the workings. The whole neighbourhood for three miles (5 km) around shook as if an earthquake had occurred accompanied by a loud roar akin to thunder. Two dense columns of smoke and debris erupted from the downcast shafts. At No. 1 pit the blast damaged the winding engine and broke the cage, disconnecting it from its rope. At No. 2 pit the cage was blown up into the headgear breaking a coupling. After about five minutes the ventilation resumed and fresh air was drawn back the downcast pits.

== Rescue attempts, day one ==
Another cage was attached to the rope in the No. 1 pit. Thomas Dymond, the colliery owner, David Tewart (alternately spelled Towart or Tewert), the underground steward, and Christopher Siddons (alternately spelled Seddons), a deputy, bravely descended first. They found 20 badly burned casualties who were quickly sent up but 14 subsequently died of their injuries. After another rope was attached, rescue volunteers including P. Cooper, John Brown, William Porter Maddison, William Auboné Potter, Kell, John Platts, George Minto, the under-viewer from Mount Osborne Colliery (and previous under-viewer at the Oaks), and other engineers and deputies from surrounding collieries, along with seventy or eighty additional men, went down. By 4:00 pm a total of about 80 workers had been recovered, but only 19 of them barely alive. Of these 19, only 6 survived and one, William Hart, later died in a different colliery accident. The few survivors of the initial blast had made their way to the shaft bottom where there was some air; those in more distant areas succumbed to the afterdamp, principally carbon monoxide. The dead were taken to their homes.

At the time of the explosion the only rescuers were volunteers and officials who came from neighbouring collieries who worked in relays. Sixteen men forced to the surface because of the foul air were accused of cowardice by bystanders. The few police present could not control the crowd, which invaded the pithead and interfered with operations. A telegram to the chief constable brought reinforcements and the area was cleared. Meanwhile, Blackburn (with his assistant), as well as Smith Sr. and Jr. had arrived to give medical aid to the injured.

A message was sent to colliery engineer Thomas Woodhouse of Duffield near Derby. It said, "The Oaks Pit is on fire. Come directly." Woodhouse was in London but his partner, Parkin Jeffcock, responded and arrived by train before 10 pm.

The rescuers' progress was restricted because of roof falls and afterdamp. Where it was possible to penetrate further into the workings bodies were found damaged by the blast. During the day the rope and cage for the No. 1 shaft were repaired and brattice was sent down to repair the stoppings. (Note: Stoppings are the permanent underground walls (wood, brick or stone) which force the air to follow the correct route throughout the mine and not just take the shortest path between pits.)

Jeffcock descended into the pit at 10 pm and met Minto, Brown, Potter, Cooper, and Platts who were finally coming up for rest. Jeffcock took charge of the operation to make the pit safe and worked to restore ventilation. Dymond and Brown, who were supervising operations, realised before the end of the first day that all the remaining men underground must be dead and from midnight underground operations were run down. At 1:30 am most of the men below ground came up due to a false alarm and Minto went with John Smith (the mining engineer from Lundhill Colliery) below to investigate. Minto and Smith found Tewart who gave them directions to Jeffcock's location at the end of the stone drift. Jeffcock, Minto, and Smith walked up the engine level checking stoppings. Part way up they encountered a strong blower of chokedamp (mainly carbon dioxide and nitrogen) which accounted for much of the foul air. Minto, Jeffcock, and several others remained in the mine and worked through the night into the next morning.

== Recovery attempts, day two ==
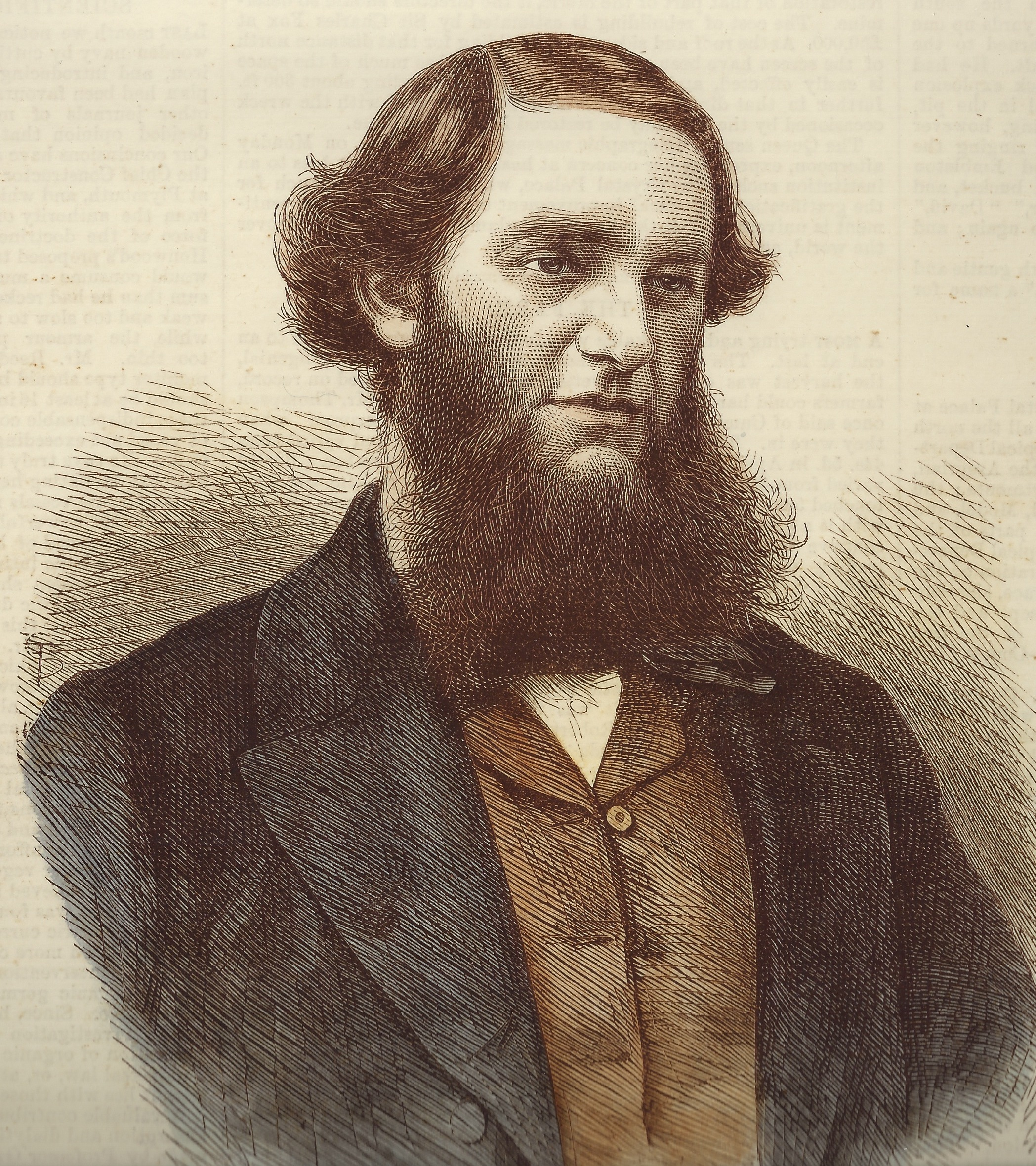
Parkin Jeffcock

Just after 5 am Minto ascended to select and organise a party of about a hundred men to recover bodies. Jeffcock remained below trying to re-establish effective ventilation. The rescue-recovery party of about seventy men were led by Smith, Tewart, William Sugden, deputy steward, Siddons, and two firemen Thomas Madin and William Stevenson.

The first explosion occurred around 8:30 am. Matthew Hague (alternately Haigh), a night deputy, was underground with Sugden in charge of a party of men about 650 yards (590 m) from the pit bottom. The air stream rapidly changed direction, a sure sign of an explosion and the men rushed to the pit bottom to be lifted out, though Sugden remained behind as he felt it his duty. At the inquest Hague described it: "I found the air turned upon us, and we 'revolted' again. That is, we were sucked backwards and forwards in consequence of the explosion. I knew this, for I am one of the survivors of the explosion twenty years ago." The first cage came up with sixteen men crammed in it (the cage was normally meant to carry six). Those waiting at the pit bottom took shelter and even bid each other farewell as they anxiously waited for the cage to return. In the midst of this, Minto descended to see what was going on. He asked Tewart where Jeffcock and Smith (of Lundhill) were and, after a brief search, spent five minutes talking with Tewart, Barker, and Siddons. He regained the surface at ten to nine to confer with the engineers.

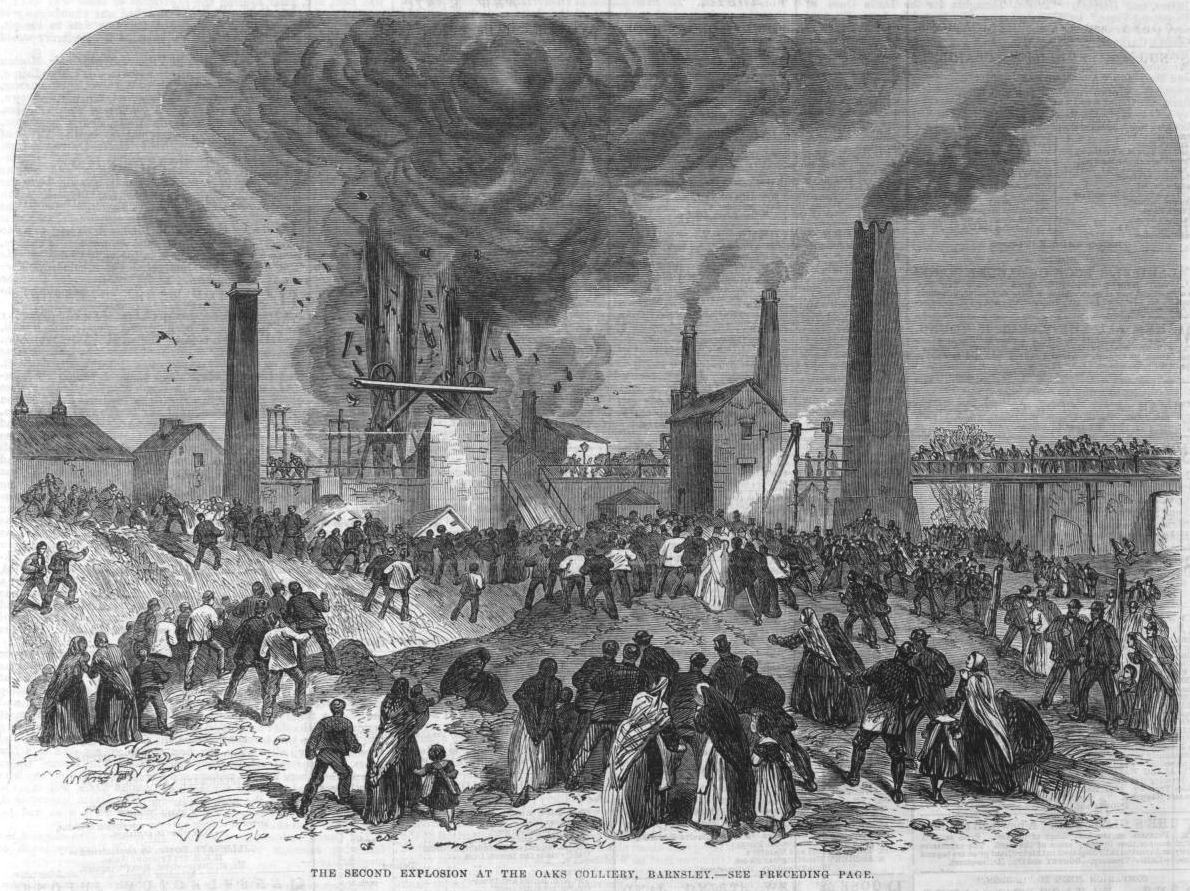
The Second Explosion, Illustrated London News.

Jeffcock had earlier sent word that he thought the mine was heating up and advised that the shaft temperature be monitored. A thermometer was lowered to check when the second explosion occurred at five to nine. Dymond, Minto, Brown, Potter, and Smith (of Monkwearmouth) had gathered around the furnace shaft to check on the air state and were thrown to the ground. No. 1 cage was blasted into the headgear, dense clouds of smoke were emitted, and large burning timbers were hurled into the air. This was a larger explosion than the first. A cage was lowered and shortly after raised but returned empty. It was apparent that the 28 rescuers still below ground (including Jeffcock, Tewart, Siddons, Sugden, Smith (of Lundhill), Barker, and twenty two others) were dead and little could be done to recover the bodies.

At 7.40 pm, a third explosion sent black smoke bellowing from No. 2 pit, the downcast shaft. The pit head was considered to be unsafe and spectators were moved to a safe distance.

Meanwhile, a telegram from Queen Victoria at Windsor Castle arrived enquiring about the explosion and loss of life. The disaster attracted massive publicity.

== Last survivor, day three ==
Between 4–5 am on Friday 14 December, the No. 1 pit signal bell rang. The mining engineers were sent for and a bottle of brandy and water was lowered by rope; when the rope was raised again, they found the bottle had been removed. As the cage was not usable, a makeshift pulley was set up and a small kibble (bucket) was attached. John E. Mammatt, the engineer in charge, volunteered to descend the shaft. Another volunteer was sought and Thomas W. Embleton Jr., with the permission of his father (T. W, Embleton Sr.), also went down. Mammatt and Embleton Jr. each placed one foot in the kibble and held onto the rope as they descended. Due to its inherent lack of stability, the rope twisted and swung them round as they were lowered so it was with difficulty that they kept from being overcome by dizziness while fending off collisions with the walls using their free arm. In addition to all this, they carried four fragile safety lamps sheltered from the water under their clothes. The men were deluged by streams of water as they descended and the roar from the water made communication nearly impossible. After a quarter of an hour, they reached the bottom and found Samuel Brown, who had entered the previous morning and had been in the pit for nearly 24 hours.

Brown had descended with the rescue party at 7 am the previous day and had been with Hoyland, Barker, and Young. They had taken shelter in a lamphole when the second larger explosion hit and Brown was knocked unconscious. When he awakened, he found his comrades were dead [though, strangely, there is no Young among the lists of casualties] and wandered to the base of No. 2 shaft. Finding nothing, he made his way to the No. 1 shaft and rang the bell. He reported he neither saw nor heard any signs of life from anyone else after the explosions Mammatt and Embleton Jr. ventured a little distance into the workings but found no other living person and saw the workings were still on fire. They bound Brown to the rope and were about to set off when Mammatt was thrown off balance and into the water below. He was able to grab onto the bucket to keep from drowning and the three balanced precariously on the kibble as they were raised to the surface.

== Aftermath ==
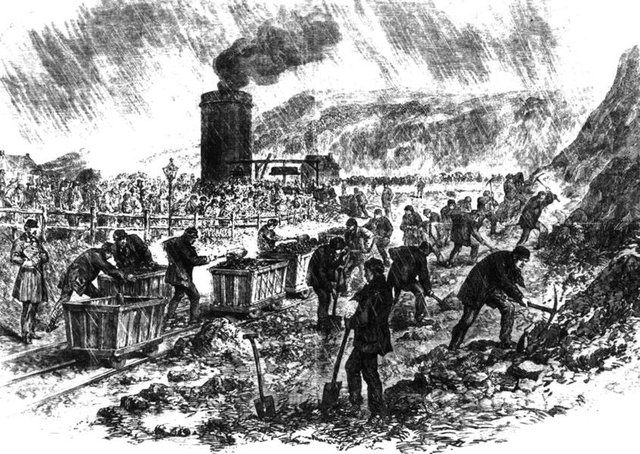
Filling the Cupola Shaft to stop the Draught of Air

On Saturday 15 December six more explosions occurred. A meeting between the colliery viewers and the government inspector concluded that nothing more could be done for those below, and with the mine alight the only option was to seal it to extinguish the fire. On the following Monday 17 December work started to seal the three shafts. Explosions continued for nearly a week more.

From 30 January until 5 November 1867, hourly checks were made at the shafts until it was deemed safe to reopen them. Tomlinson describes a visit he made to the pithead during this time:

One shaft was filled up – chokeful of earth and rubbish; the other had a wooden scaffold suspended by wire ropes, and let down about twenty yards. Upon this cage was first piled straw, &c., and then puddled clay; so that, except a small aperture from a temporary iron pipe (which contains a valve to close or open the orifice at will), this shaft, also, was sealed up.

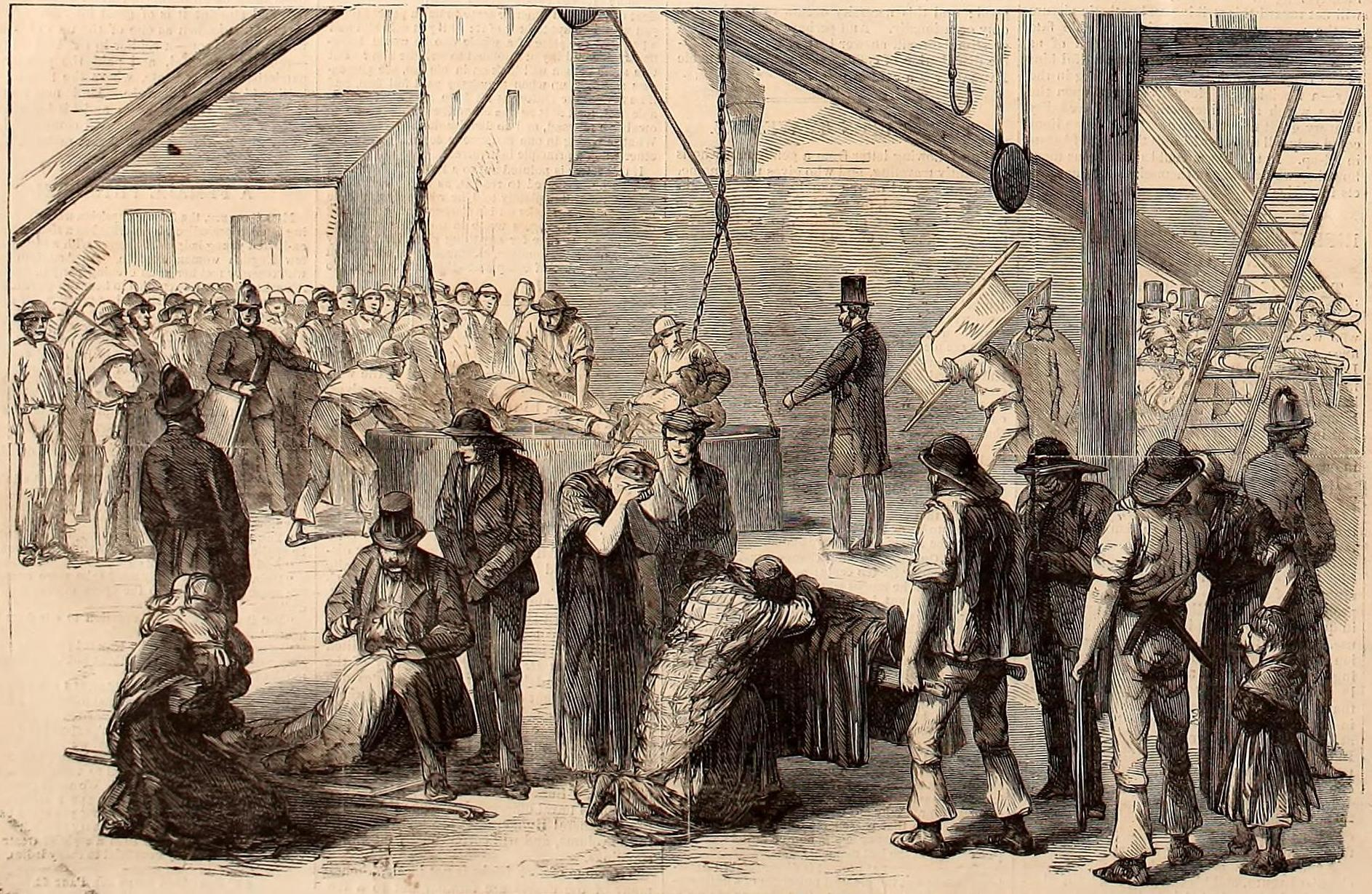
Recovery of the bodies, Harper's Weekly

Once the shafts were reopened and ventilation established the task of recovering the bodies began. Jeffcock's body was discovered on Saturday 2 October 1869 and buried the following Monday. The colliery reopened in December 1870. The 150 bodies still underground were recovered. It was noted in contemporary reports that some of the bodies were sufficiently preserved to permit identification.

=== Sightseers and funerals ===
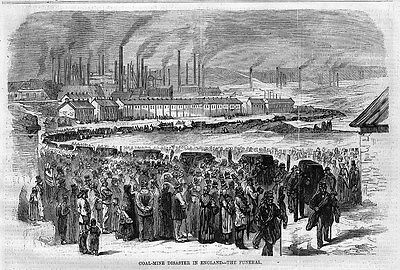
The funeral, as published in Harper's Weekly

On Sunday 16 December, special trains filled with sightseers ran to Barnsley from Leeds, Wakefield, Sheffield and Manchester. Roads to the colliery were filled with sightseers and vehicles. Special services were held in Barnsley's churches where the bishop of Ripon was the preacher.

The bodies that had been recovered were interred in Ardsley churchyard, where 35 were buried in a mass grave, at Monk Bretton and in the new municipal cemetery.

=== Families ===
Major disasters had a devastating impact on local communities and Hoyle Mill and nearby settlements lost most of their young and adult men leaving scores of widows and even more dependent children. The Oaks disaster happened at a time of multiple catastrophes in coal mines. Around Barnsley there had been several major disasters including 73 deaths at Oaks in 1847, 75 at Darley Main in Worsborough in 1849 and 198 at Lundhill in 1857. In 1866 nearly all the men in Hoyle Mill perished, some families lost not only the breadwinner but three or four sons.

The disaster left 167 widows and 366 children under twelve. It was a national disaster and funds were raised immediately to support the families. Queen Victoria subscribed £200 and the Lord Mayor of London opened a fund. Money was raised in many parts of the country and small sums were donated by individuals. The Oaks Colliery Relief Fund was established in Barnsley and in total £48,747 was raised of which £11,695 came from the Lord Mayor's Mansion House fund. Altogether 690 individuals were eligible for relief, but although £27,000 remained in the fund in 1908, families were inadequately supported. Some miners subscribed to accident insurance clubs which could not cope with the cost of such sudden high demands. Some local friendly societies paid their members grants towards funeral costs and colliery owners provided a small amount of temporary aid and allowed the families to stay rent free in the pit houses. The union, still in its infancy, paid £8 in funeral costs, 5 shillings per week to widows and a shilling for children under twelve. Five shillings is equivalent to £56 in 2025. (Note: UK Consumer Price Index inflation figures from 1209–2024 based on data from "Inflation calculator". Bank of England. London. 18 February 2026.) and two shillings and sixpence for each child under the age of thirteen was paid from the public relief fund. Should a widow remarry she received a bonus of £20 (equivalent to £2,248 in 2025), but all further benefit ceased.

== Inquest ==
The inquest opened on 14 December at the Old White Bear public house in Hoyle Mill. The Coroner was Major Thomas Taylor (1823-1900) 15 jurors were sworn in and 16 bodies were identified. The proceedings moved to Barnsley Court House on 20 December. The inquest lasted for 13 days, but despite the evidence given by several miners and the evidence from the deputation who had complained about the presence of gas to the management two weeks before the explosions, no definite conclusion could be reached. The district mines' inspector, Charles Morton, resigned during the inquest with ill health and his place was taken by Joseph Dickinson from Lancashire.

William Gibson gave evidence that the night before the meeting of the men and the management, gas had fired at his master, Andrew Barker's lamp and he was "knocked up" after three and a half hours work. Gibson left his job at the colliery the Sunday before the explosion after four or five years employment. Hague, a night deputy, told the inquest of finding 16 bodies between 100 yards (91 m) and 200 yards (180 m): "They were not burnt or scorched in the least, but appeared as if asleep." James Marsh, a miner from Worsbro'dale tried to push on past Hague, but had to turn back "as the air was so bad".

The inquest could not conclusively ascertain what had caused the explosion or what was the source of the first ignition. Some survivors mentioned an exceptionally violent blast just before the main explosion. This may have been caused by blasting the drift near the Barnsley seam which ignited pockets of firedamp. The initial blast may have caused a chain reaction triggering a firedamp and coal dust explosion that devastated the rest of the pit. Although the cause was never properly discovered, 17 explosions were recorded at the Oaks Colliery. After the inconclusive verdict was delivered the reactions in the press included a barrage of condemnation and criticism.

On behalf of the Mines Inspectorate, Joseph Dickinson submitted his report to parliament at the end of April 1867. Petitions were sent to the Home Office asking for an official inquiry into the disaster and the unsafe state of coal mines generally. Dickinson and a representative of the colliery owners were interviewed by a select committee of the House of Commons but the government responded with no urgency and twelve more explosions had occurred before the 1872 Coal Mines Act was operational.

== Legacy ==
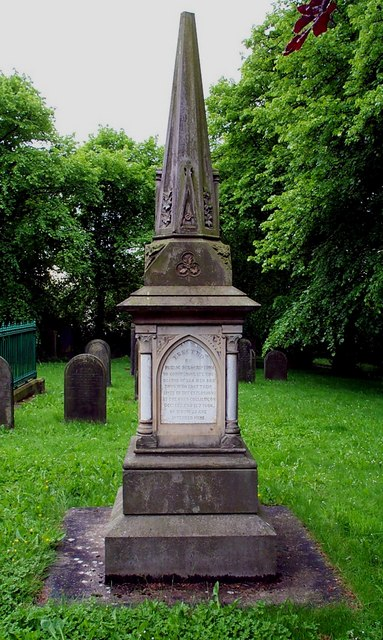
Monument at Ardsley

A monument to those killed in the disaster was erected at Christ Church, Ardsley in Barnsley in 1879. A second monument was erected in 1913 to Parkin Jeffcock and the volunteer rescuers who were killed.

Parliament considered the subject of colliery accidents in 1868. During 1865–6 the deaths of 2,468 workers led to calls for more to be done to prevent such accidents. Inspectors visited after the accidents had taken place and nothing was done to prevent them. Complaints made by workmen to the mines inspectors usually had substance. An increase in the number of inspectors was considered but conditions could only improve when the collieries were better managed. Unskilled managers and their subordinates, underground viewers needed educating. Disasters caused the colliery owners to become more receptive to inspections as accidents and losses would be lessened if sub-inspectors could make suggestions as to the better management of the collieries making them safer for the workforce. The great loss of life in the pits led to the announcement of a Royal Commission.

== Death toll ==
It was stated under oath and in two Command Reports to Parliament that the explosions killed 361 men and boys, based on 340 working below ground in the first explosion (with six survivors) and 27 rescuers killed on 13 December. The explosion was the worst in British mining history until the Senghenydd Colliery Disaster which claimed 439 lives in the South Wales coalfield in 1913. The Oaks disaster remains the worst in an English coalfield.

A volunteer research project by the Dearne Valley Landscape Partnership in 2016 produced a list of 383 names although not all were verified as dead in the disaster. The ages of those killed ranges from 10 to 67.

== See also ==
- List of United Kingdom disasters by death toll
- Glossary of coal mining terminology

== Bibliography ==
- Ball, Dave (18 July 2005), Oaks Colliery Disaster Rescuers' Memorial, Sheffield Hallam University
- Barnsley MBC (2016), Oaks Disaster Victims, Dearne Valley Landscape Partnership
- BBC (18 September 2011), "Major mining disasters in Britain", BBC News (UK), BBC
- Duckham, Helen; Duckham, Baron (1973), Great Pit Disasters: Great Britain 1700 to the present day, Newton Abbot: David & Charles, ISBN 0715357174
- Elliott, Brian (2006), South Yorkshire Mining Disasters Volume I The Nineteenth Century, Wharncliffe, ISBN 1903425646
- Embleton, T. W. (1876), "Notes on the Oaks Colliery explosion, of the 12th December, 1866, and on the subsequent explosions", North of England Institute of Mining and Mechanical Engineers: Transactions, XXV, Newcastle-Upon-Tyne: 29–40
- The Graphic (17 December 1870), Home News, Illustrated Newspapers
- Hansard (26 May 1868). "Motion for a commission". Parliamentary Debates (Hansard). United Kingdom: House of Commons. col. 939–945.
- Historic England, "Barnsley Main Colliery engine house and pithead structures (1413541)", National Heritage List for England
- Jeffcock, John Thomas (1867), Parkin Jeffcock, civil and mining engineer. A memoir by his brother, London: Bemrose and Lothian
- Ordnance Survey (1855), Yorkshire 274 (includes: Barnsley; Darton; Dodworth.), Six-inch England and Wales, 1842–1952, Ordnance Survey
- Taylor, Fionn, ed. (8 November 2016), The Oaks. Barnsley, Yorkshire 13th December 1866
- The Times (8 January 1900), Obituary: Mr Thomas Taylor
- Tomlinson, John (1868), "The Oaks Colliery two months after an explosion", Stories and sketches relating to Yorkshire, London: Simpkin, Marshall, & co, pp. 223–236, hdl:2027/loc.ark:/13960/t8kd33r33
- Woodtyke (22 November 2010), Oaks Colliery Disaster Rescuers' Memorial Barnsley Yorkshire 2, Flickr
