= Alexander John Scott =

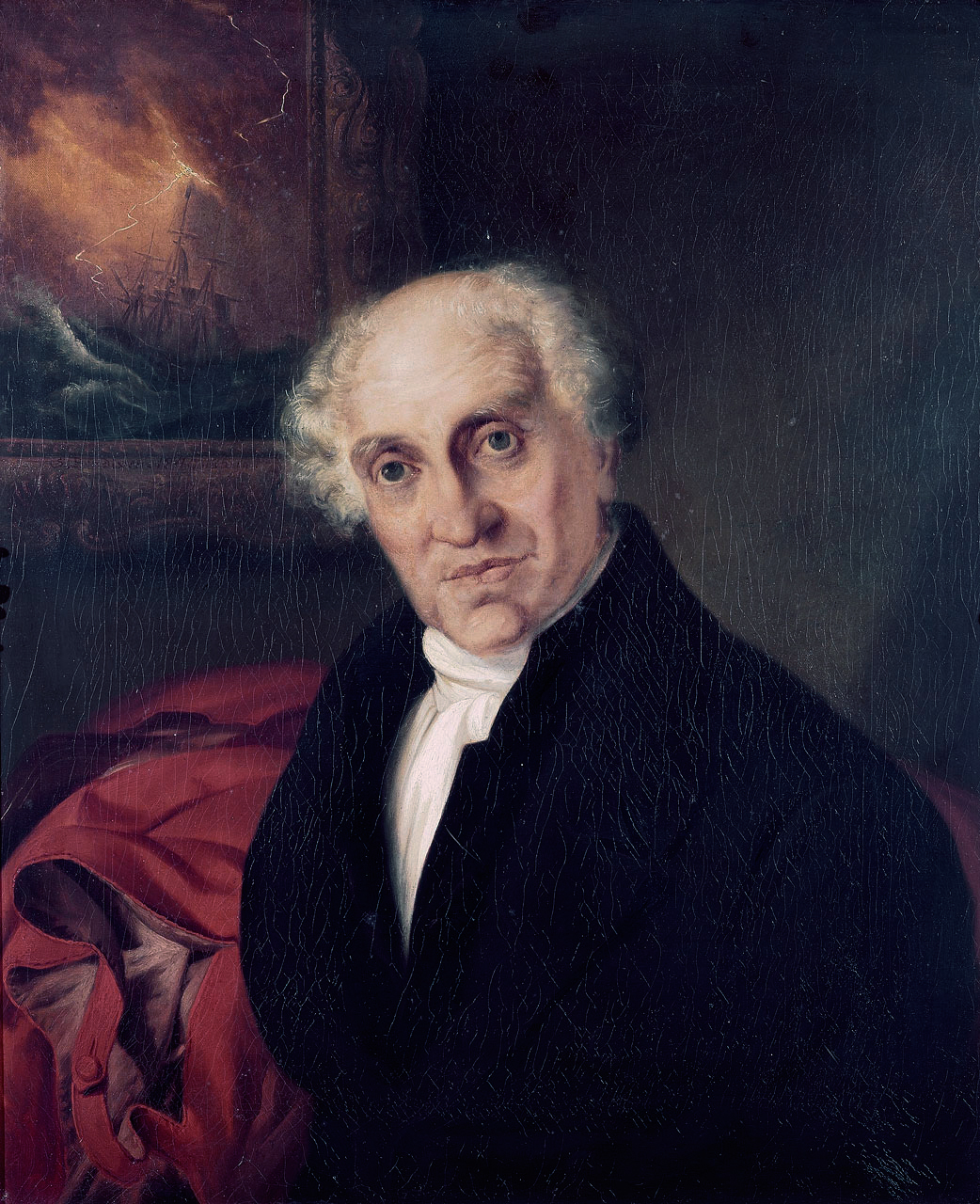
- The Reverend Doctor Alexander Scott, by Siegfried Detlen Bendixen
- Born: 23 July 1768; Rotherhithe, Southark
- Died: 24 July 1840 (aged 72); Ecclesfield, Yorkshire
- Military career
- Allegiance: United Kingdom of Great Britain and Ireland
- Branch: Royal Navy
- Service years: 1793–1805
- Rank: Chaplain
- Conflicts: Battle of Copenhagen; Battle of Trafalgar

Alexander John Scott (23 July 1768 - 24 July 1840) was an Anglican chaplain who served in the Royal Navy during the French Revolutionary and Napoleonic Wars. He served as Horatio Nelson's personal chaplain at the Battle of Trafalgar, and had previously served as his private secretary. Scott was a close friend of Nelson, and was with him as he died aboard HMS Victory.

== Early life ==
Scott was born on 23 July 1768, the son of Jane Comyn and Robert Scott, a lieutenant in the navy. He had two sisters. He was the nephew of Alexander Scott, a naval captain. Scott's father died in 1770, leading Scott to live with his uncle for the majority of his childhood. He was educated at Charterhouse, and after gaining a scholarship, he attended St John's College, Cambridge, graduating from there in 1792. He was ordained in 1793 and joined the navy that year as a chaplain. He was initially assigned to HMS Berwick, which was part of the Mediterranean fleet under Admiral Samuel Hood. During his education he had become fluent in French, Spanish and Italian.

== Meeting Nelson ==
Scott first met Nelson while in the Mediterranean. Nelson was at this time captain of the 64-gun HMS Agamemnon. Scott was offered the position of Nelson's chaplain, but declined it, instead moving aboard the 98-gun HMS St George, followed by the 100-gun HMS Britannia, then under Sir Hyde Parker. He was present at Nelson's victory at the Battle of Copenhagen in 1801, this time aboard the 98-gun HMS London. After the battle was over, Scott helped to draw up the treaties subsequently presented to the Danish, and accompanied Nelson's party as an interpreter. After Parker's recall, Nelson asked for Scott to join him, but Scott could not bear to leave Parker and returned to England with him while Nelson remained in the Baltic.

== West Indies ==
Scott was then assigned to the frigate HMS Topaze which was sent to the West Indies, serving with Admiral John Thomas Duckworth. Duckworth used Scott's linguistic abilities to help in translating documents and to spy and eavesdrop whilst visiting foreign ports. On one occasion he brought Scott to dine with him and the French general Charles Leclerc, in order to try to ascertain the French intentions towards the Caribbean. In 1803, whilst aboard the Topaze, Scott was the victim of an accident that left him severely shaken. He was struck by lightning while sleeping in his cabin, the bolt also igniting some powder and cartridges that were stored above him. The explosion and electric shock knocked out several teeth, injured his jaw and affected his hearing and eyesight. He recovered, but was continually thereafter affected by his nerves.

== Nelson and Trafalgar ==
Nelson arranged for Scott to be transferred to his flagship, HMS Victory, in 1804 as his foreign secretary. He had decided that Scott's gift for languages would make him a desirable addition to his staff. It's important to note that while Scott studied Portuguese, French, Italian, and Spanish, he admitted he was not a master of most of the languages he studied, but rather was assisted in his communication by either natives or Englishmen that spoke the language. Lord Hoartio Nelson's personal secretary was also named John Scott. To avoid confusion, Nelson termed Alexander Scott, now installed as his chaplain and private/foreign secretary, as 'Doctor Scott' to avoid confusion. Scott was not actually a Doctor at this point, the award of the Doctorate of Divinity from the University of Cambridge came after Trafalgar. Scott often spent his time aboard Victory reading newspapers and letters captured from foreign prizes to Nelson.

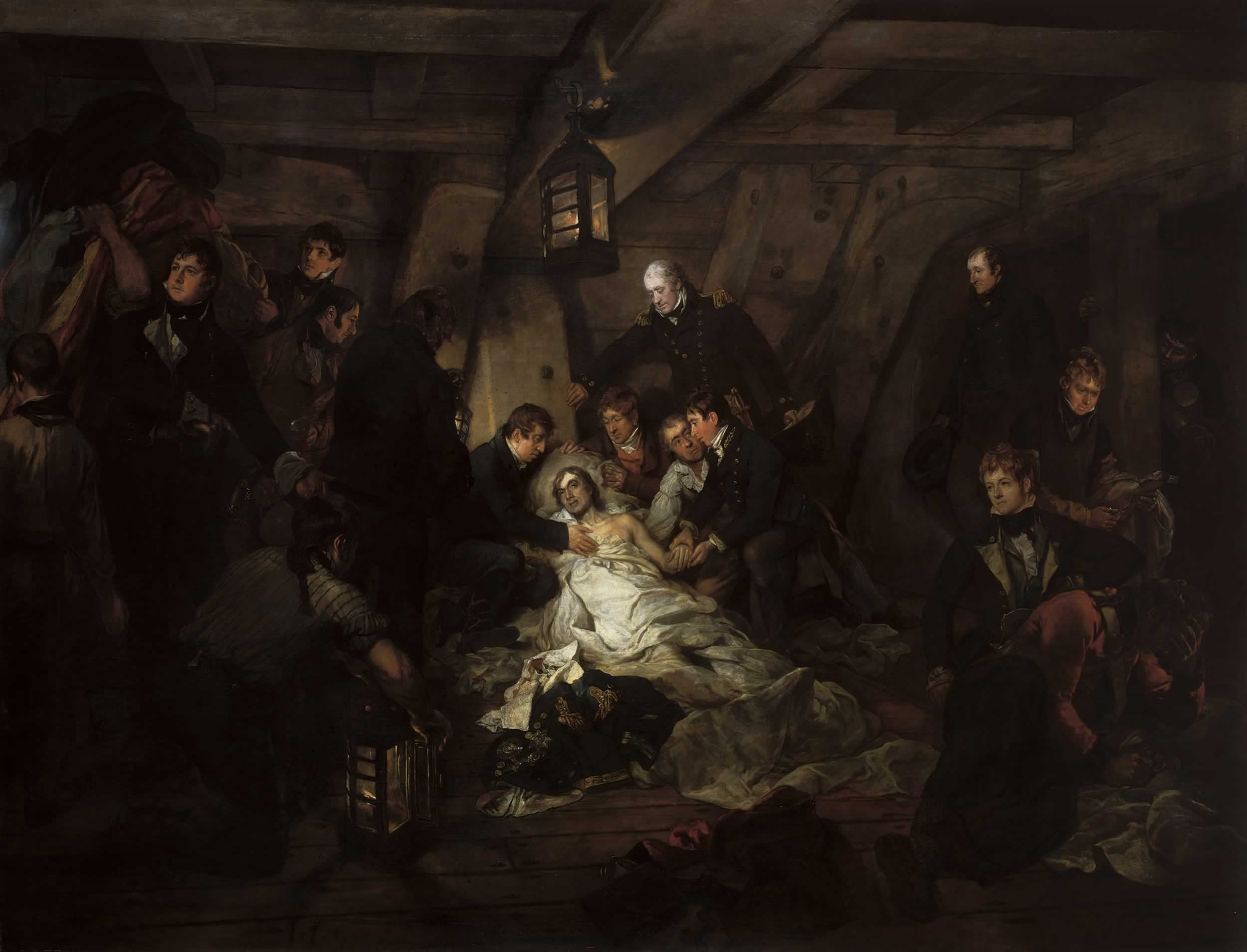
Scott is prominently depicted in Arthur William Devis's The Death of Nelson, 21 October 1805. Scott is to the immediate left of Nelson in the picture, rubbing Nelson's chest to relieve his pain.

Scott initially went below at the start of the battle to be with the wounded as they were brought to the cockpit. He soon became overwhelmed with the sights and sounds, and began to head up to the deck for fresh air. On the way he passed a figure being carried below to the surgeon, and learnt that it was Nelson. He remained with Nelson during his last hours, supporting him and rubbing his chest. After Nelson had died and the surgeon, William Beatty was summoned, Scott was found to be still rubbing the chest. He accompanied the body back to England, was with Nelson during the lying in state at Greenwich Hospital and attended the funeral processions and the ceremony in St Paul's Cathedral. He later wrote of his friend:

Men are not always themselves and put on their behaviour with their clothes, but if you live with a man on board ship for years, if you are continually with him in his cabin, your mind will soon find out how to appreciate him. I could forever tell of the qualities of this beloved man, Horatio Nelson. I have not shed a tear before the 21st October, and since whenever I am alone, I am quite like a child.

Nelson had hoped that if he were to die, that George Rose, then Vice-President of the Board of Trade, would help Scott with money. He also wished for his brother William Nelson to surrender his prebendal stall at Canterbury Cathedral to Scott, when William Nelson inherited. William however declined to.

== After Trafalgar ==
Scott lived a peaceful life after the battle although he suffered from painful illness in later life. He became Chaplain to the Prince Regent in 1816 and then the incumbent of a government living at Catterick.

In 1807, the 39-year-old Scott attracted his family's displeasure by eloping to marry the 17-year-old Mary Frances Ryder. The newly-weds moved into the vicarage at [Burnham on Crouch] where Scott assumed the curacy to supplement his income as Rector of nearby Southminster. They had a son who died shortly after birth named George Alexander, and two daughters, Horatia Sophia and Margaret. Mary died in 1811, having been weakened by the birth of their son.

Scott's daughter Margaret became a best selling author under her married name of Margaret Gatty. She authored a memoir about his life Recollections of the Life of the Rev. A. J. Scott.

He died at Ecclesfield, Yorkshire on 24 July 1840 at the age of 72, and was buried in the churchyard of the Church of St. Mary, Ecclesfield

Scott was a collateral forebear of the Antarctic explorer Captain Robert Falcon Scott.
