= Adrian Horridge =

Australian neurobiologist (1927–2024)

George Adrian Horridge
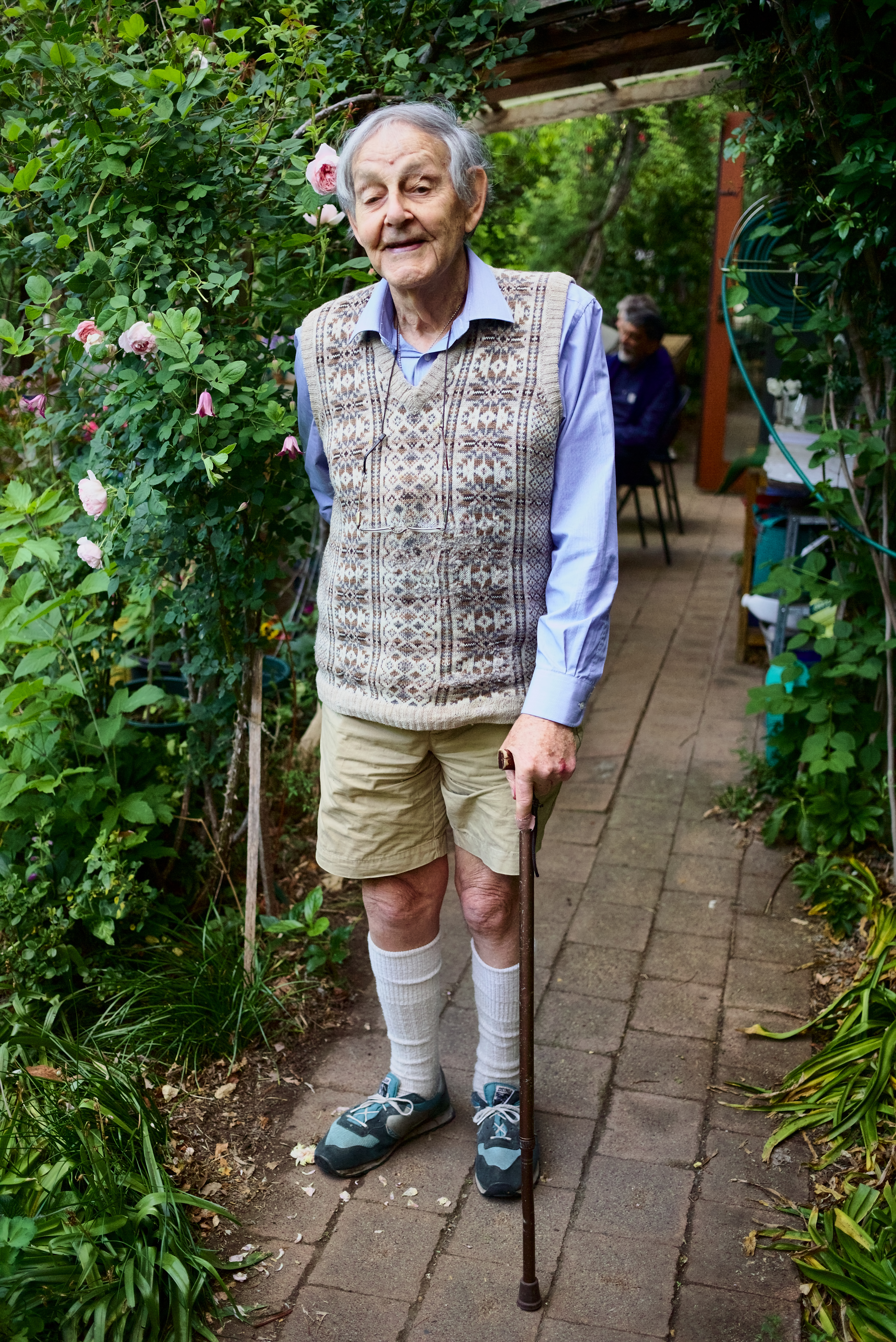
- Born: 12 December 1927; Sheffield, England
- Died: 30 April 2024 (aged 96); Canberra, Australia
- Education: Cambridge
- Awards: FRS (1969), FAA (1971)
- Scientific career
- Fields: Neurobiology
- Institutions: University of St Andrews Australian National University
- Website: adrian-horridge.org

George Adrian Horridge FRS FAA (12 December 1927 – 30 April 2024) was an Australian neurobiologist and professor at Australian National University.

== Life and career ==
Horridge was born in Sheffield, England, to George William Horridge (1897–1981) and Olive (1899–1995), daughter of Albert Stray, who owned a chain of sweetshops. The Horridge family had operated a business in Sheffield- William Horridge and Company, "Stag, Buck, Horn, Wood and Buffalo Handles, and Scale Cutters"- since 1750, producing amongst other things ivory scales for piano keys, combs, and knife handles. His paternal grandfather was the last to be involved with the company, which was sold in 1921 for £15,000 ("when you could buy a house for £100"); after World War I, Horridge's father started a motorbike repair and sale business in his back yard, which expanded until he and a business partner were substantial motorcycle agents with a showroom and repair shops.

He attended King Edward VII School. He obtained a scholarship to St John's College, Cambridge in 1946. He earned a PhD from the University of Cambridge and was appointed to a Fellowship in Chemistry at St. John's in 1953. From 1960 till 1969, he was Director of the Gatty Marine Laboratory at the University of St Andrews. From 1969 till 1993, he was a professor at the Research School of Biological Sciences at the Australian National University, and subsequently emeritus Professor. He lived in Yarralumla, Canberra. In retirement he produced a number of books and articles on bee vision.

In 1965, together with Ted Bullock, he published the two-volume “bible of invertebrate neurobiology”: Structure and Function in the Nervous System of Invertebrates.

He received the Zoological Society of London Scientific Medal in 1968 for his work on the anatomy and physiology of nervous systems of invertebrates. He was elected a Fellow of the Royal Society in 1969 and to the Australian Academy of Science in 1971. In 2001 he was awarded a Centenary Medal "for service to Australian society in the biological sciences".

In 2019, a very large virus, Megaklothovirus horridgei was named after him.

In 1975, he served for three months as the Chief Scientist aboard the US Research Ship Alpha Helix in the Moluccas, working mainly on the eyes of deep-sea animals. On this trip, his interest in Indonesian sailboats developed. In addition to his biological work, Horridge published on the indigenous watercraft of Island Southeast Asia and the Pacific Ocean, and their prehistory. His publications in this field include Sailing Craft of Indonesia (1986), the chapter The Austronesian Conquest of the Sea - Upwind in The Austronesians: Historical and Comparative Perspectives (2006) and the chapter Origins and Relationships of Pacific Canoes and Rigs in Canoes of the Grand Ocean (2008).

== Personal life ==
Horridge was married for 59 years to Audrey (1930–2013), daughter of Rev. Harcourt Robert Henry Lightburne, vicar of St Mary's, Upchurch, Kent. She was a Girton College, Cambridge and Barnett House, Oxford graduate responsible for the Service for Overseas Students- coordinating over 30,000 nationwide- with the Australian Development Agency, and formerly a social planner with the National Capital Development Commission. Horridge left a son and four daughters.

== Works ==
- What Does the Honeybee See?: And How Do We Know?. ANU E Press. 2009. ISBN 978-1-921536-98-4.
- John Aloimonos, ed. (1997). "Pattern and 3D Vision of Insects". Visual navigation: from biological systems to unmanned ground vehicles. Psychology Press. ISBN 978-0-8058-2050-8.
- Horridge, Adrian (1986). Sailing Craft of Indonesia. Singapore: Oxford University Press. ISBN 978-0-19-582647-0.
- Horridge, Adrian (2006). "The Austronesian Conquest of the Sea: Upwind". In Bellwood, Peter (ed.). The Austronesians: historical and comparative perspectives. Canberra, ACT: ANU E Press. ISBN 978-0-7315-2132-6.
- Horridge, Adrian (2008). "Origins and Relationships of Pacific Canoes and Rigs". In Di Piazza, Anne; Pearthree, Erik (eds.). Canoes of the Grand Ocean. Oxford: Archaeopress. ISBN 978-1-4073-0289-8.
