= Aunt Judy's Magazine =

British youth magazine

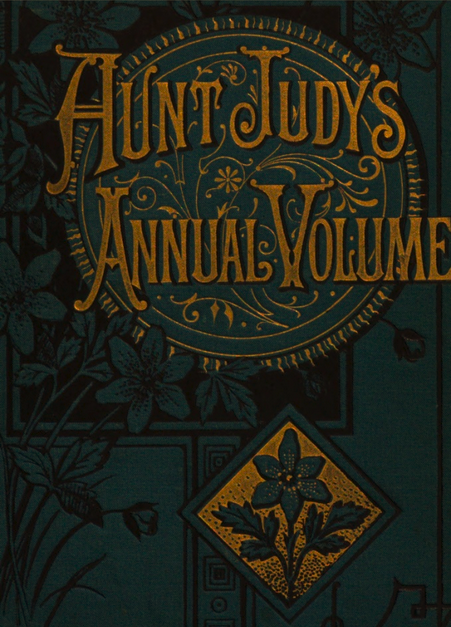
- Aunt Judy's annual volume, published in 1884
- Founder: Margaret Gatty
- Founded: 1866
- Final issue: 1885

Aunt Judy's Magazine was a British magazine for young people founded in 1866 by Margaret Gatty. After her death in 1873, publishing was continued by her daughter Horatia Eden until 1885. The magazine is named after Gatty's daughter, Juliana Horatia Ewing's childhood nickname, "Judy."

As the editor, Gatty aimed to include stories that would not only benefit the moral upbringing of children, but that would also bring joy and insight to adults. Gatty hoped that readers would continue to love the magazine for their whole life, and to pass it on for generations. When choosing what contributions to include in the magazine, Gatty kept in mind her belief that every piece in the magazine should have a moral for its reader.

Gatty included a piece that she wrote in the November 1868 issue of the magazine titled "Unopened Parcels." The story was highly moral in tone, and involves a young girl learning from her father about repentance. The father tells his daughter a story about his childhood, and how a friend of his learned the lesson of repentance by spending his life attempting to fix the deceit he committed on his mother. Following the telling of the story, the father asks the daughter to decipher what his story meant for herself rather than have him tell her what he believes it should mean. Gatty wanted children to learn morals, but she wanted them to come to terms with these morals on their own with simply guidance from adults. Gatty included themes of both morality and religiosity, which is consistent with many of the stories in the magazine.

In 1868, the magazine published two early parts of Lewis Carroll's Sylvie and Bruno, entitled "Fairy Sylvie" and "Bruno's Revenge." It also published much of the work of Juliana Horatia Ewing. Hans Christian Andersen made several contributions, and illustrations by George Cruikshank, John Gilbert, Charles Keene, and Randolph Caldecott also appeared.
