= Catterick, North Yorkshire =

Village, civil parish and electoral ward in North Yorkshire, England

Coordinates: 54.377°N 1.630°W

Catterick
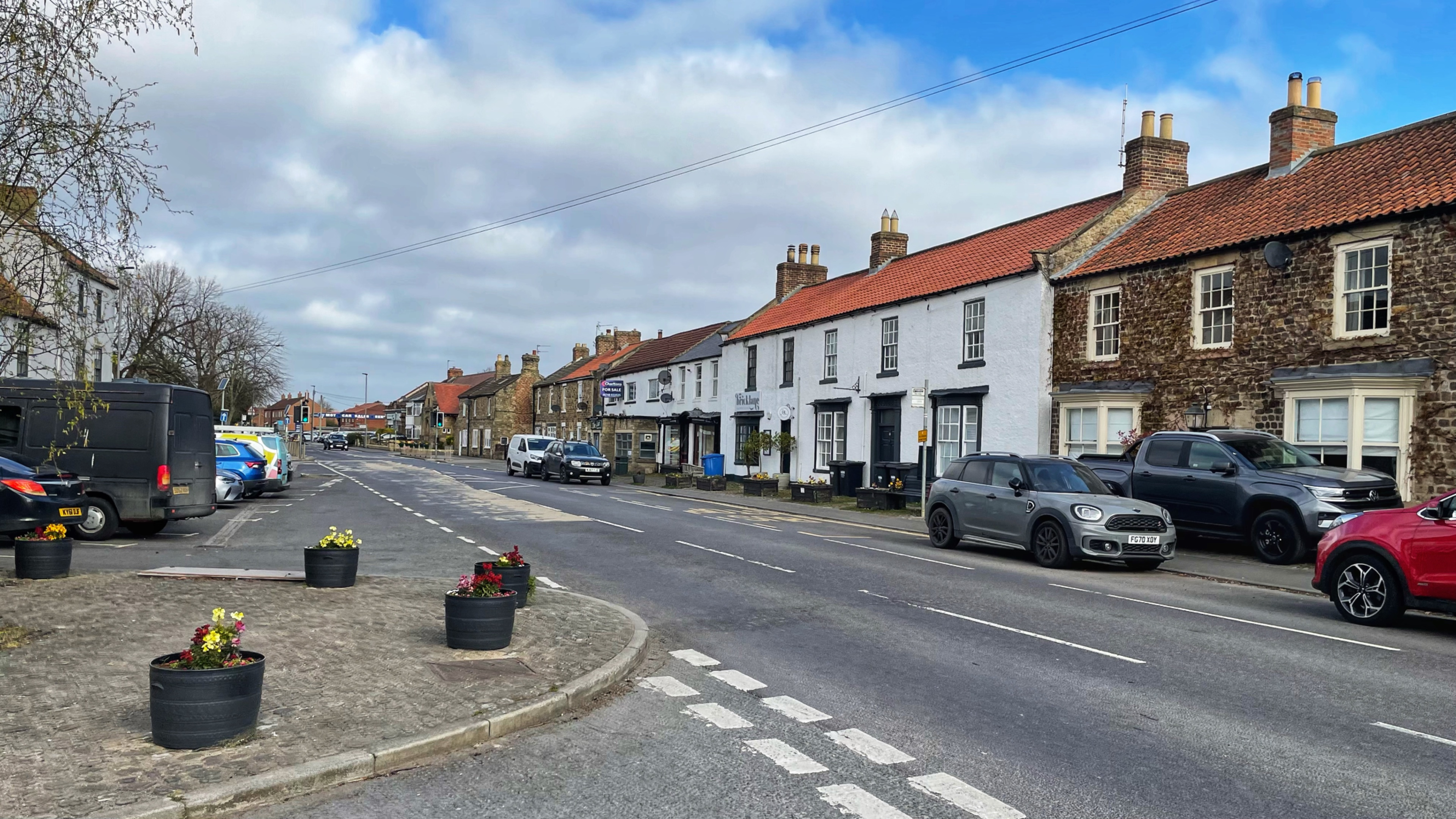
- Low Green junction with the High Street

- Location within North Yorkshire
- Population: 3,155 (2011)
- OS grid reference: SE240980
- Civil parish: Catterick
- Unitary authority: North Yorkshire
- Ceremonial county: North Yorkshire
- Region: Yorkshire and the Humber
- Country: England
- Sovereign state: United Kingdom
- Post town: RICHMOND
- Postcode district: DL10
- Dialling code: 01748
- Police: North Yorkshire
- Fire: North Yorkshire
- Ambulance: Yorkshire
- UK Parliament: Richmond and Northallerton

Catterick (/ˈkætərɪk/) is a village, civil parish and electoral ward in North Yorkshire, England. Historically part of the North Riding of Yorkshire, it is 8.5 miles (13.7 km) north-west of the county town of Northallerton just to the west of the River Swale. It lends its name to nearby Catterick Garrison and the nearby hamlet of Catterick Bridge, the home of Catterick Racecourse where the village Sunday market is held. It lies on the route of the old Roman road of Dere Street and is the site of the Roman fortification of Cataractonium.

== Toponymy ==
The etymology of the name is derived from the Latin place name Cataractonium, which looks like a Latin/Greek mixture meaning "place of a waterfall", but it might have been a Roman misunderstanding of the Celtic name Catu-rātis meaning "battle ramparts", as partly supported by the spelling Κατουρακτονιον (Catouractonion) on the Ptolemy world map.

== History ==
The Angel and village centre

The place is mentioned in Ptolemy's Geographia of c. 150 as a landmark to locate the 24th clime. It dates back to Roman times, when Cataractonium was a Roman fort protecting the crossing of Dere Street over the River Swale.

Catterick is thought to be the site of the Battle of Catraeth (c. 598) mentioned in the Welsh language poem Y Gododdin. This was fought between Celtic British or Brythonic kingdoms and the Anglo-Saxon kingdom of Bernicia. Paulinus of York performed baptisms nearby in the River Swale.

Catterick is mentioned in the Domesday Book of 1086 as Catrice. The manor was held by Earl Edwin at the time of the Norman invasion, and was afterwards was granted to Count Alan of Brittany. Thereafter the demesne manor was held by the lords of Richmond. The manor has been held by John of Gaunt in the 14th century and the Earls of Salisbury in the 15th century. The manor was held for a while by Sir John Conyers from 1484. During the reign of Queen Mary I, the manor was granted to the youngest daughter of Henry Pole, 1st Baron Montagu, whose son Francis Barrington inherited the honour. The Barrington family passed the manor to Richard Braithwaite whose descendants inherited the manor and held it until the 18th century. Other lords of the manor included the Lawson family, who held it into the late 19th century.

Pallet Hill, just to the north of the village church, is the site of the earthwork remains of a motte and bailey castle. It is thought to have been built by King Stephen in the mid 12th century to control the Great North Road. It has been designated a Scheduled Ancient Monument. To the south of the village on the south side of the former A1/A6136 interchange, is the site of a small Roman roadside settlement and cemetery on Bainesse farm. It has been designated a Scheduled Ancient Monument.

In later times, Catterick prospered as a coaching town where travellers up the Great North Road would stop overnight and refresh themselves and their horses; today's Angel Inn was once a coaching inn. A mile to the south-east are the surviving earthworks of Killerby Castle, a medieval motte-and-bailey castle.

Catterick was a large ancient parish, extending into three wapentakes (Hang East, Hang West and Gilling West) of the North Riding of Yorkshire. It included the townships of Appleton, Bolton upon Swale, Brough, Colburn, Ellerton upon Swale, Hipswell, Hudswell, Killerby, Kiplin, Scorton, Scotton, Uckerby and Whitwell. All these places became separate civil parishes in 1866.

In 1914 Catterick Camp (later Catterick Garrison) was established 4.7 miles (7.6 km) west of the village, in the ancient parish of Catterick but in the civil parishes of Hipswell and Scotton. It is recorded that during the First World War, men came to Catterick to complete their basic training before being deployed to their respective front or Base Depot. RAF Catterick, the airfield to the south of the village also opened in 1914, was transferred to the Army and is now Marne Barracks, named after the site of two significant battles of the First World War.

In 1974 Catterick was transferred to the new county of North Yorkshire and was part of the Richmondshire district until 2023.

== Governance ==
Catterick is part of the Richmond and Northallerton parliamentary constituency. The current Member of Parliament is Rishi Sunak, a Conservative, who was Prime Minister of the United Kingdom. His predecessor was William Hague, former Conservative Party Leader and Foreign Secretary, who represented the constituency from 1989 to 2015.

From 1974 to 2023 it was part of the district of Richmondshire, it is now administered by the unitary North Yorkshire Council. It lies within the Catterick Bridge electoral division of North Yorkshire Council. Catterick also has a parish council.

== Geography ==
Brough Beck, Catterick

The village lies along A6136 road to Richmond and is by-passed by the A1. The A1 bypass, which cost £1 million at the time, was opened in 1959 by Lord Chesham, the Joint Parliamentary Secretary to the Ministry of Transport. The River Swale turns southward just to the north of the village at Catterick Bridge and flows to the east side of the Catterick. Brough Beck runs east through the village to join the River Swale. There are several bodies of water that are the result of quarrying. Within 2.5 miles (4.0 km) of Catterick are the villages of Brompton-on-Swale, Catterick Bridge, Colburn, Tunstall, East Appleton, Ellerton-on-Swale, Whitwell, Scorton and Uckerby.

The adjacent A1 road and the village have suffered with flooding from Brough Beck. This was most notable in 2012, when a flash flood caused the A1 to be closed for 24-hours in both directions in September 2012. 149 properties in Catterick were flooded and the knock-on effect was believed to have cost the regions' economy over £2 million. In conjunction with the new build and upgrading of the A1 to motorway standard, a £6 million flood reservoir was built on the west side of the A1(M) and downstream of Brough Park. The scheme was officially opened in May 2018, but had its first major test in March 2018 when meltwater from snow in the dales flooded the lower valley. The reservoir can hold over 91,000,000 imperial gallons (410,000,000 L; 109,000,000 US gal) of water and it is hoped that wildlife will colonise the reservoir.

== Demography ==
Population
Year	1801	1811	1821	1831	1841	1851	1881	1891	1901	1911	1921	1931	1951	1961	1981	2001	2011
Total	2,450	2,382	2,641	2,815	2,710	2,771	650	681	546	534	564	849	2,161	2,011	2,742	2,743	3,155

=== 2001 census ===
The 2001 UK census showed that the population was split 52.6% male to 47.4% female. The religious constituency was made of 83.4% Christian, 0.25% Buddhist, 0.11% Jewish, 0.11% Other and the rest stating no religion or not stating at all. The ethnic make-up was 97.6% White British, 0.9% White Other/Irish, 0.4% Mixed Ethnic, 0.21% Black British, 0.21% Other Ethnic and 0.25% British Asian. There were 1,050 dwellings.

=== 2011 census ===
The 2011 UK census showed that the population was split 58% male to 42% female. The religious constituency was made of 70.75% Christian, 0.16% Buddhist, 0.19% Muslim, 0.85% Hindu, 0.54% Other and the rest stating no religion or not stating at all. The ethnic make-up was 92.4% White British, 2.3% White Other/Irish, 1.2% Mixed Ethnic, 0.76% Black British, 0.38% Other Ethnic and other and 1.77% British Asian. There were 1,200 dwellings.

== Culture and community ==
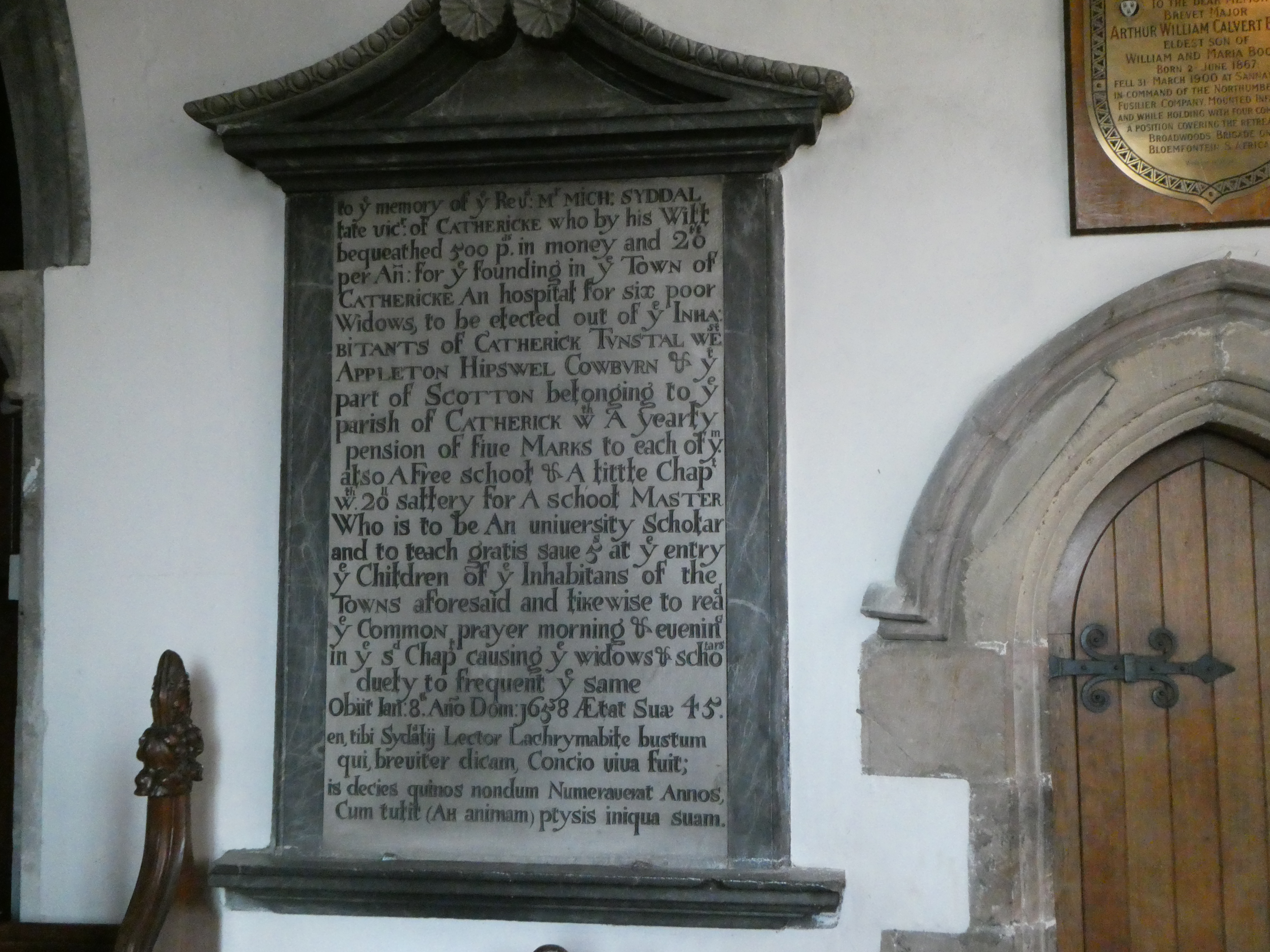
The Memorial to the Rev. Michael Sydall in St Anne’s, Catterick; his name lives on in the local school

Marne Barracks borders the village to the south along Leeming Lane and Oran Lane. The base and service quarters are separated from the village by a protective fence. There are a few local businesses, such as take-away food outlets, public house and a car service station. There is a sports ground which is used for cricket and football.

Horse racing takes place year round at Catterick Racecourse, where the first recorded meeting was in 1783. This popular track stages 17 flat race meetings between April and October, with some 10 jump meetings between November and March.

BFBS Radio broadcasts from studios on Shute Road across the town and surrounding areas on 106.9 FM as part of its UK Bases network.

Michael Sydall C of E Primary School provides education for a mixed gender pupil intake between the ages of four and eleven. The school has an official capacity of 252 pupils. The school is named after a vicar of the village church of St Anne who founded a school in the village in 1658. The school is in the catchment area of Risedale Sports & Community College in nearby Catterick Garrison for secondary education needs.

== Religion ==
St Anne's Church, Catterick

The church in the village is dedicated to St Anne and is a Grade I listed building. The current building was completed in 1412 and added to in both the 15th and 19th centuries. A Wesleyan chapel was built in the village in 1842 on Low Green next to the local public house.

== Notable residents ==
- John Catterick (died 1419) is reputed to have come from the village. He held the positions of Bishop of Coventry and Lichfield as well as the Bishop of Exeter and Bishop of St David's. He was an important member of the King's court during the reigns of Henry IV and Henry V.
- Theophilus Lindsey (1723–1808), the Unitarian minister and theologian, was vicar of Catterick for ten years from 1763 until 1773, partly to live close to his friend and father in law Francis Blackburne.
- Thomas Booth (c.1755–1835) was the owner and farmer of the nearby estate of Killerby. He was a successful stock breeder, winning prizes for breeding out defects in the traditional shorthorn cattle to produce better milk and meat producing animals.
- Alexander John Scott (1768–1840) was a vicar of Catterick from 1816 until his death in 1840. A naval chaplain, he had served with his uncle, Rear-Admiral Alexander Scott, in the West Indies. He was a close friend and secretary of Lord Horatio Nelson.
- Sir William Brown (1784–1864) attended the school of Rev Bradley in Catterick. He became a successful merchant, firstly in the cotton trade and later in shipping and finance. In later years he became involved in local politics in Liverpool and represented the South Lancashire Parliamentary constituency.
- William Henry Angas (1781–1832) attended boarding school at Catterick. He initially had a career at sea, but became a church minister and missionary.
- George Fife Angas (1789–1879) attended Catterick School from 1801 to 1804 and was the younger brother of William Henry Angas. He joined the South Australia Land Company in 1832 and shortly after became a member of the South Australia colonization commission.
- Frederick John Jackson (1860–1929) was born at Oran Hall in Catterick in 1860. He had a career in the British Imperial East Africa Company before turning to public service. He held the position of Lt Governor of the East Africa Protectorate (now Kenya) and then Governor of Uganda from 1911 to 1917.
- Amy James-Kelly (1995–), British actress (Coronation Street, Three Families) spent some of her early life in Catterick.

== See also ==
- Listed buildings in Catterick, North Yorkshire
