= Listed buildings in Kirkby Fleetham with Fencote =

Kirkby Fleetham with Fencoteis a civil parish in the county of North Yorkshire, England. It contains eight listed buildings that are recorded in the National Heritage List for England. Of these, two are listed at Grade II*, the middle of the three grades, and the others are at Grade II, the lowest grade. The parish contains the village of Kirkby Fleetham and the surrounding countryside. The listed buildings consist of a church, a country house and associated structures, farmhouses and a vicarage.

== Key ==
Grade	Criteria
II*	Particularly important buildings of more than special interest
II	Buildings of national importance and special interest

== Buildings ==
Name and location	Photograph	Date	Notes	Grade
St Mary's Church; 54.35626°N 1.56888°W		12th century	The church has been altered and extended through the centuries, and it was restored and further altered in 1871 by Henry Woodyer. It is built in stone and has roofs of lead and Welsh slate. The church consists of a nave with a clerestory, a north aisle, a south porch, a south chapel, a chancel with a north vestry, and a west tower. The tower has three stages, diagonal buttresses, a south stair turret, bands, two-light bell openings, and an embattled parapet. There is also an embattled parapet along the nave. The south doorway is Norman and round-arched, with one order and zigzag decoration.	II*
Lancaster House and outbuildings 54.34604°N 1.56625°W	—	Early 18th century	The farmhouse is in stone with red brick dressings, quoins, and a tile roof with stone copings and shaped kneelers. There are two storeys and two bays. The central doorway has a quoined surround and a keystone, and above it is a dated and initialled tablet. The windows are horizontally-sliding sashes with segmental brick arches. The outbuilding to the left has a single storey and contains three doorways. The right outbuilding is recessed, with two storeys and one bay, it has a brick front and a projecting outshut.	II
Friars Garth; 54.34779°N 1.57266°W	—	Mid to late 18th century	A farmhouse in red brick, with dentilled eaves, and a pantile roof with two rows of stone slates, stone coping and shaped kneelers. There are two storeys and three bays, and a lower right wing. In the centre is a trellised porch and a doorway with a keystone. The windows are sashes with flat brick arches.	II
Kirkby Fleetham Hall; 54.35581°N 1.56855°W		Mid to late 18th century	A country house in rendered stone with stone dressings and hipped roofs of stone slate and lead. The main range has two storeys, a basement and attics, and seven bays, to the left is a link wall and a one-storey pavilion, and to the right is a single-storey three-bay wing. The main range has a sill band, the middle five bays have a cornice and a blocking course, and the outer bays project under pediments with moulded cornices. Steps lead up to a central doorway with an architrave, a Doric surround, a frieze and a cornice. In the ground floor of the outer bays are Venetian windows, and the other windows on the front are sashes, the window above the doorway tripartite. In the attic are five dormers with sashes. On the pavilion is a domed cupola with a bell. The north front has eleven bays, the outer three bays on each side projecting and bowed.	II*
Gate piers, Kirkby Fleetham Hall; 54.35552°N 1.57123°W		Mid to late 18th century	The gate piers at the southwest entrance to the grounds of the hall are in stone with a square plan, and are about 3 metres (9.8 ft) high. Each pier has a plinth, a small vermiculated tablet under a large impost block, a frieze with an oval vermiculated tablet, a plain square cornice and a domed cap.	II
North Lowfield Farmhouse; 54.35419°N 1.54940°W	—	Late 18th century	The farmhouse is in red brick, with eaves bands, and a Welsh slate roof with stone coping. There are two storeys and three bays, and a lower two-storey one-bay wing on the right with three bays on the return. In the centre is a hip roofed porch, and the windows are sashes with flat brick arches.	II
Salutation Farmhouse; 54.33272°N 1.57148°W	—	Late 18th century	The farmhouse is rendered, it has stepped eaves, and a pantile roof with stone coping. Thee are two storeys and three bays, a double depth plan, and a lower two-storey one-bay wing to the right. On the front are two doorways with fanlights, and the windows are sashes.	II
The Vicarage; 54.34530°N 1.56209°W		Late 18th century	The vicarage is in red brick, with an eaves band, and a stone slate roof with stone coping. There are two storeys and three bays. In the centre is a porch, and a doorway with a moulded architrave and a pediment. The windows are sashes with flat brick arches.	II
