= Church of St Anne, Catterick =

Coordinates: 54°22′36.2″N 1°37′55.3″W

Church of St Anne
- St Anne's Church
- Church of St Anne, Catterick

- Church of St Anne, Catterick, in North Yorkshire
- OS grid reference: SE240970
- Location: Catterick, North Yorkshire
- Country: England
- Denomination: Church of England

History
- Founded: 1412
- Dedication: Saint Anne
- Consecrated: 1415

Architecture
- Functional status: Active
- Architectural type: Gothic; Perpendicular (Note: Glynne describes it as Perpendicular; others describe it as Gothic)

Administration
- Diocese: Leeds
- Archdeaconry: Richmond & Craven
- Deanery: Richmond
- Parish: Catterick with Tunstall

Clergy
- Vicar: Reverend Peter King

Listed Building – Grade I
- Designated: 4 February 1969
- Reference no.: 1131488

The Church of St Anne is a parish church in the village of Catterick, North Yorkshire, England. The present church structure dates back to the early 15th century, but some of its stones are from an earlier structure located on the same site. A place of worship in Catterick village is believed to have been in existence since the 7th century. The church has been dedicated to Saint Anne since its original consecration date of 1415.

The contract between the benefactors of the church and their stonemason is one of the oldest contractual documents written in English and has provided much insight into the Northern English dialect at that time.

The north side of the church has a small section dedicated to the Royal Air Force Regiment who had their home depot at the nearby RAF Catterick between 1946 and 1994.

== History ==
St Paulinus was believed to have baptised converts to Christianity in the River Swale near to Catterick Bridge in the 7th century. The Venerable Bede recorded a church there in the same century, at least two Anglo-Saxon kings of Northumbria were married at Catterick (Æthelwald Moll of Northumbria and Æthelred I of Northumbria) and a church is noted as being present in Catterick village in the Domesday Book. The Domesday Book recorded the deanery as being the Ecclesia de Catrice with the church then present being situated slightly further north than the present day one. At the time of the Anglo-Saxons, many Christian religious sites did not have permanent buildings, but a cross to designate the holy site; part of a shaft from an Anglo-Saxon cross is in the west wall of the north aisle and other pieces unearthed during an archaeological investigation in the 1920s, now reside in the Museum of Archaeology at the University of Cambridge.

The present day church is located on Church Green in Catterick village with the A1(M) and the A6055 road to the west. Whilst a place of worship has been located on the site since the 7th century, the current structure (though amended) was started in 1412. The benefactors of the church were Dame Katherine de Brugh and her son William. William became a patron after the death of his father (Dame Katherine de Brugh's husband), John de Burgh of Catterick. A contract was drawn up between the de Burgh family and their stonemason, Richard of Cracall (Crakehall). The preserved document is notable as being one of the oldest contractual documents written in the English language. On the reverse of the contract is the notation that William de Burgh, his son and his father, are all buried in the church.

The contract has attracted scholars because it is written in a northern dialect of English, which makes it of "exceptional interest to the building historian." (Note: This endentor made atte Burgh the agetende day of the Moneth of Aprill the yere of Kenge Herry ferth after the conquest of Ingland thrittende betwixt dame Katerine of Burgh somtyme the wife of John Burgh William of Burgh the son of forsaide John and dame Katerine of ta partie. And Richarde of Cracall mason on the tothir partie bereth witnes that the forsaid Richarde takes full charge for to make the Kirk of Katrick newe als werkmanschippe and masoncrafte will and that the forsaide Richard sall finde all the laboreres and servys pertanand to the Kirke makinge This indenture made at Brough, the eighteeneth day of the month of April, the year of King Henry the Fifth, after the conquest of England, written between Dame Katherine de Bruge, sometime wife of John de Bruge, [and] William, the son of forsaid John and Dame Katherine of the party. And Richard of Crakehall, mason on the other party, bear witness that the forsaid Richard takes full charge for to make the church of Catterick new, all workmanship and masoncraft and that the forsaid Richard shall find all the labourers and service pertinent to the church making) Speight theorises that as Latin was the de facto language in spoken and written form, the use of English was because Richard of Cracall was largely uneducated in an academic sense, and the language used in the contract was something he could understand. Whilst the contract allowed Richard of Cracall some free rein, in other places it stipulated building works that must be undertaken; the north window from the previous church was to installed at the new east window in the north aisle, and stones were to be positioned at the western end to allow for the erection of a tower. The contract is dated 18 April 1412 and placed a demand upon Richard of Cracall to have the church completed by the time of the Feast of St John The Baptist in 1415, "unless sudden war or pestilence should afford sufficient excuse for delay". The church was dedicated to St Anne, who was Jesus Christ's maternal grandmother.

The original part of the church was 55 feet (17 m) by 22 feet (6.7 m) and consisted of the two aisles (north and south) with a nave and chancel. The vestry, porches and tower were added later (in the same century), and some of these additions are also thought to be the work of Richard of Cracall. The tower measures 57 feet (17 m) from ground to the top and whilst it was not part of the original contract, provision was made at that time for the addition "of a steeple".

William Burgh died in 1442 and he was buried in the east end of the north nave aisle. His grandson (also called William), extended this section and created the Chantry of St James. Whilst the church has remained largely unaltered, the two chantry chapels were added during the latter part of the fifteenth century to accommodate burials from the de Burgh family. Raine notes that each aisle is now one arch longer than contracted for and that the vestry porches and the tower were not included in the original contract.

The font was carved and installed not long after the original contract with Richard of Cracall. It's octagonal bowl is inscribed with the coats of arms of many local noble families (de Burgh, Scroop, Neville, Fitzhugh and Lascelles). It was long believed that the font and its stone base had been carved out of either grey or black marble, but a more modern assessment holds that it is black limestone with a very high polish. The interior of the church contains many plaques, brasses and monuments to the dead, including an effigy of Sir Walter Urswick who fought on the side of the Black Prince at the Battle of Nájera and who was later the Constable of Richmond Castle in 1371.

The church was damaged by cannon fire in the First English Civil War and was also damaged by German bombers during the Second World War. In 1658, the Reverend Michael Syddall invested £45 per annum (Note: There is some disagreement over the amount given for the two causes; McCall states in Story of the family of Wandesforde of Kirklington & Castlecomer that his will specifically mentions the residue of his estate, Lewis maintains it was £45 and other sources mention £500.) to fund a hospital and school which was in use between 1685 and 1974. The newer local Church of England primary school in the village is also called the Michael Syddall School. A sundial is located above the porch door, its origins being either late 18th or early 19th century. The words above the dial are in latin; Fugit hora, ora, which translates as Time flies, pray.

In 1816, Alexander John Scott, the chaplain to Horatio Nelson was appointed as the vicar at St Anne's. Scott had been aboard HMS Victory when Nelson was fatally wounded and stayed with him to administer the last rites. Scott died in 1840 and a new vicar was appointed in 1841. The church has undergone two periods of restoration and refurbishment; firstly in 1851 under Atkinsons of York when the pews were made into a uniform standard and the doors were replaced. In April 1872, the church was re-opened after redesign work, including adjustments undertaken on the clerestory, by the architect C. G. Wray, whose only other notable religious work, was in the design of the nearby Church of St Matthew in Leyburn, North Yorkshire. The stained glass window at the east end of the church depicts The Last Supper and is by William Wailes, being installed in 1862. Other stained glass windows in the church are by Charles Eamer Kempe and were installed in 1896 and 1900.

The churchyard contains graves from both World Wars, and befitting its proximity to RAF Catterick, most of the 1939–1945 war dead were from the Royal Air Force. There is also a memorial to those who served on No. 26 Squadron RAF and No. 41 Squadron RAF (both of which were based at RAF Catterick during the Second World War) on the north wall of the church. A survey conducted on the graves in 1994, determined that there were 127 graves in the churchyard and that a number of the gravestones were undecipherable due to weathering.

The church was grade I listed in 1969 and its northern gateposts, which date from the 18th century, were grade II listed in 1987. The church and its surrounds are also included in the Catterick Village Conservation Area.

In April 2018, it was revealed that the church was suffering a funding shortfall and appealed to the local community to help with an extra £10,000 a year that the church needed to keep open.

== RAF Regiment ==
A section of the north side of the church is dedicated as the Royal Air Force Regiment Chapel. The RAF Regiment had their home depot at the nearby RAF Catterick between 1946 and 1994, after which date, they moved to RAF Honington. During the 50-year anniversary celebrations of the RAF Regiment in 1992, The Queen awarded the RAF regiment a new colour and the old one was 'laid up' in the RAF Regiment Chapel in the Church of St Anne. The chapel also contains a north facing window commemorating those who have died whilst serving in the RAF Regiment. The window is composed of stained glass with left and right panes inscribed with a memorial text and the badges of RAF Catterick and the RAF Regiment showing.

To date, the chapel at the Church of St Anne remains the 'home chapel' of the RAF regiment despite their move away from Catterick in 1994.

== Clergy ==
Vicars incumbent at St Anne's are recorded as far back as 1215, 200 years before the present church was completed. Listings are taken from H.B. McCall's Richmondshire Churches and church records.

2025	Peter King	Year	Incumbent	Year	Incumbent
1215	Richard	1542	Christopher Jeffrayson	1809	Samuel Byam
1239	Duraguerra de Piperno	1569	Gregory Scott♦ (Note: McCall notes that the next in line were possibly a "Mr Hutton" and a "Thomas West".)	1816	Alexander John Scott†
1316	John	1576	Thomas Scott	1841	John Croft†
1342	John de Corimbria (Note: Possibly spelt Cornubia)	1591	John Christian‡	1869	Richard Garde†
1342	John de Wilton (Note: Whilst some list his incumbency as starting in 1342, in 1339 he is listed as "the vicar at Caterick"[sic] by The Treasury)	1594	Henry Thurscross‡	1891	John H Evans†
1354	John de Danby	1603	Richard Faucett	1903	William Kerr Smith
1362	John de Moorland	1645	Michael Syddall†	1930	Joseph Fenner Spink
1362	John de Littilgarne†	1660	Charles Anthony†	1936	R F Bradley
1399	Thomas de Burgh	1685	Robert Collingwood†	1956	Charles H G Ridley
1399	Thomas Elleston‡	1691	William Iveson†	1966	Malcolm D Emmel
1410	William Wenslawe†	1722	John Wandesford†	1973	Dennis R Walker
1427	William Gold‡	1748	Jeremiah Harrison†	1979	George C Darvill
1429	Robert Bedale‡	1763	Theophilus Lindsey‡	1988	William R Hogg
1430	Henry Wilsthorpe	1774	Henry Chaytor†	1998	James Stewart
1453	John Glover	1790	John Wilson	2004	Francis Wilson
1525	Henry Laciter♦	1791	James Dalton‡	2012	Lindsay Southern
1535	Oswald Metcalfe‡	1805	George Chamberlaine‡		

- †Died in office
- ‡Resigned office
- ♦Interregnum between incumbent and previous when dates are incorrect, period appears too long or records are incomplete.

== See also ==
- Grade I listed buildings in North Yorkshire (district)
- Listed buildings in Catterick, North Yorkshire

== Gallery ==
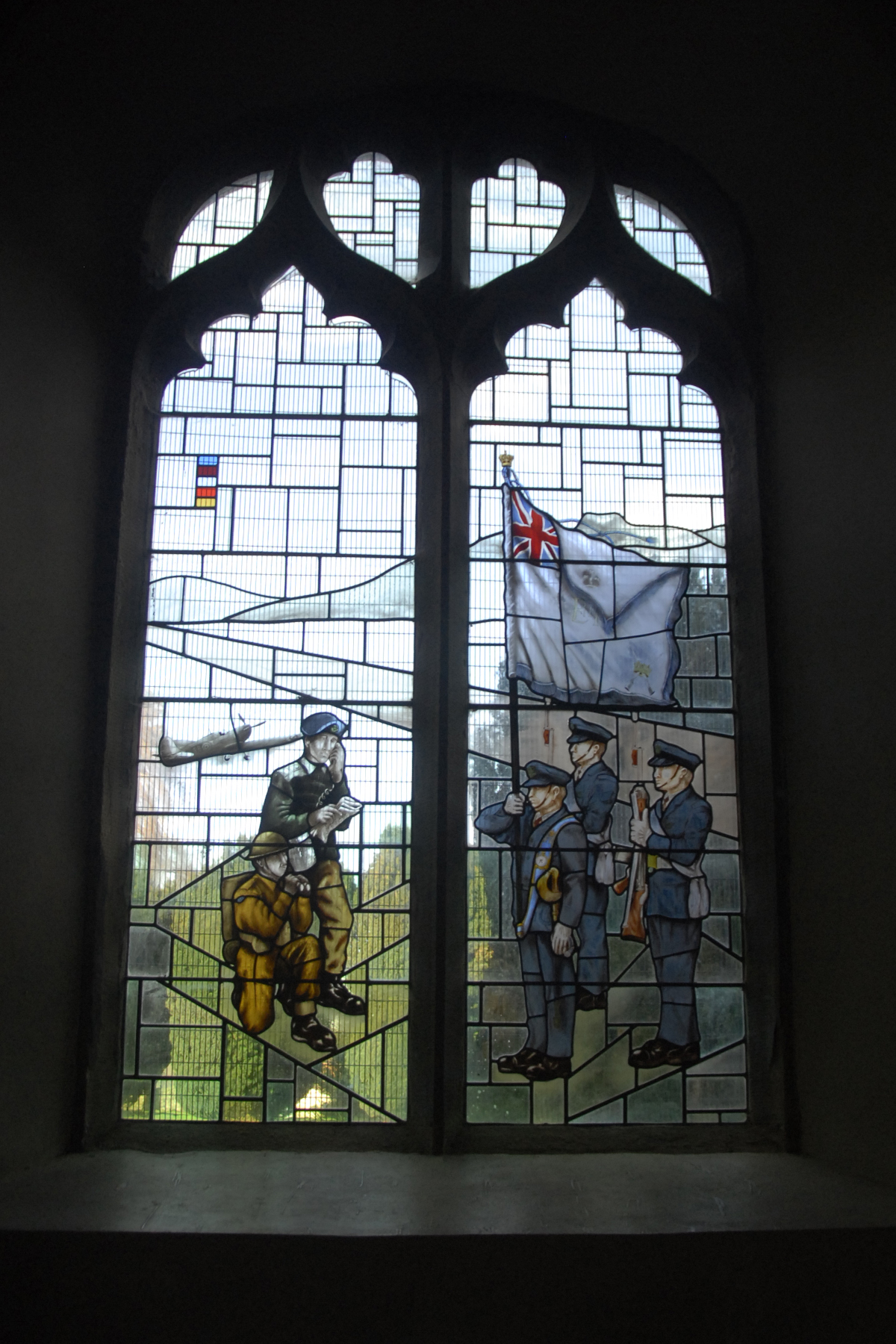
Left window of RAF Regiment Chapel, Church of St Anne, Catterick

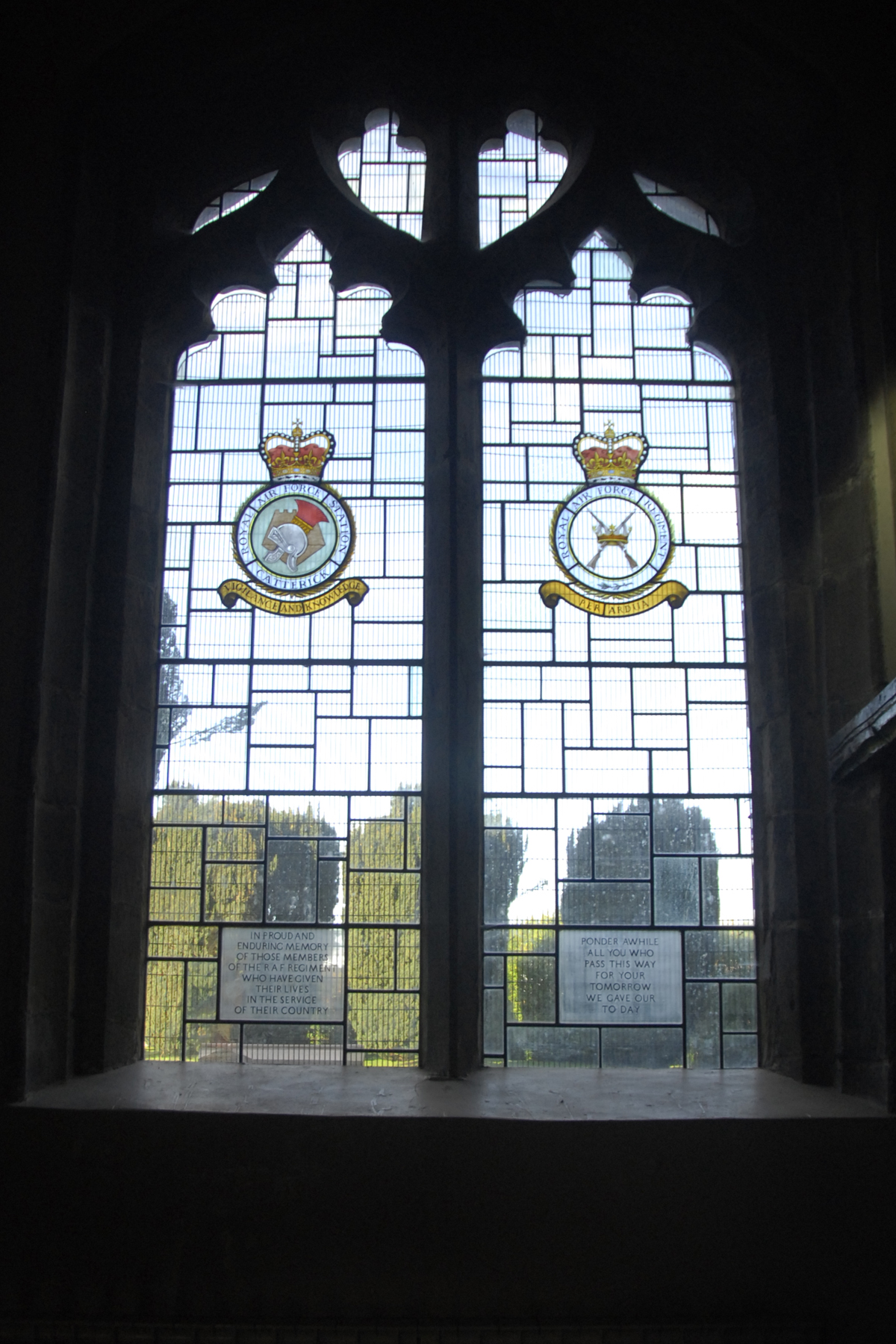
Right window of RAF Regiment Chapel, Church of St Anne, Catterick

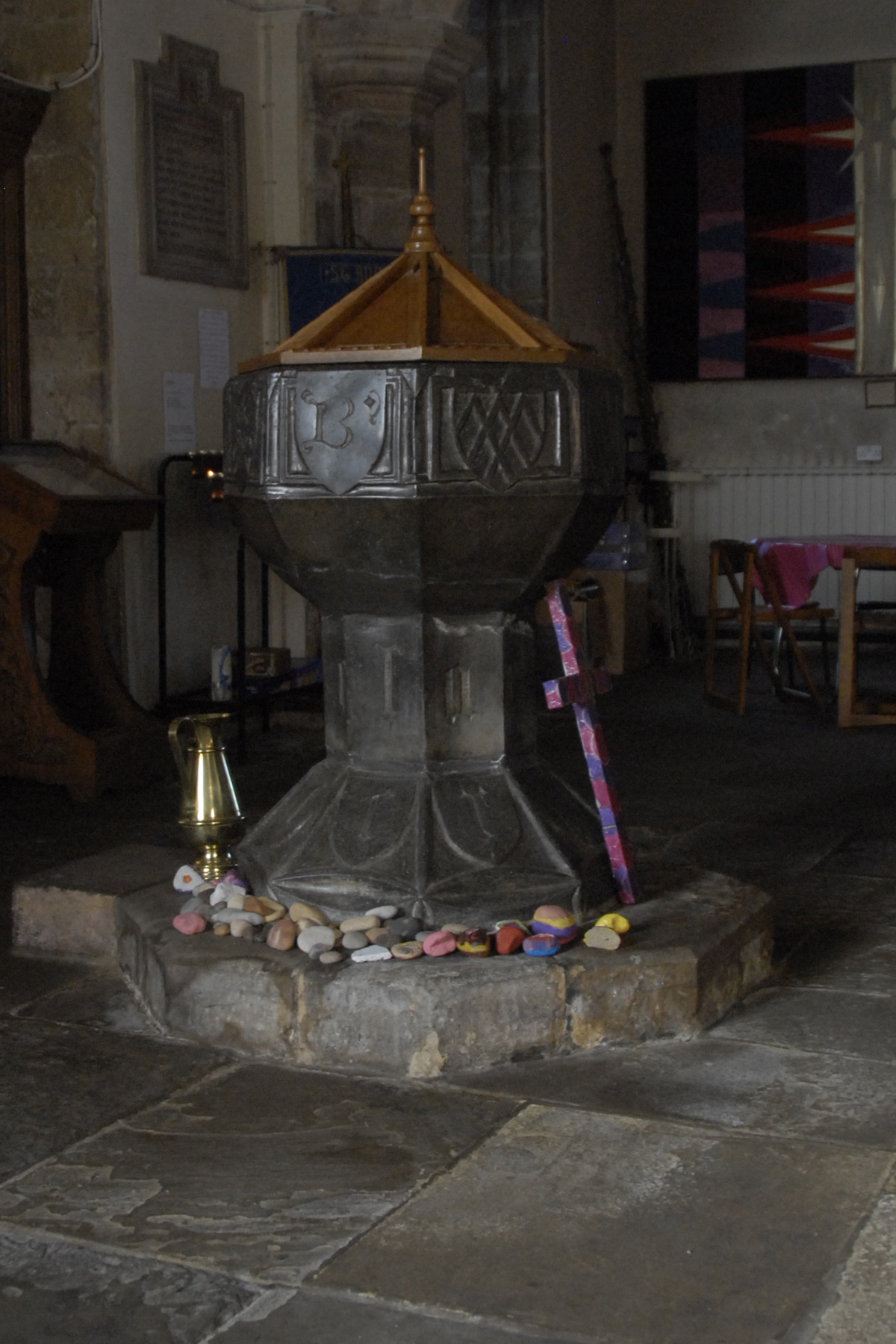
Font in the Church of St Anne, Catterick

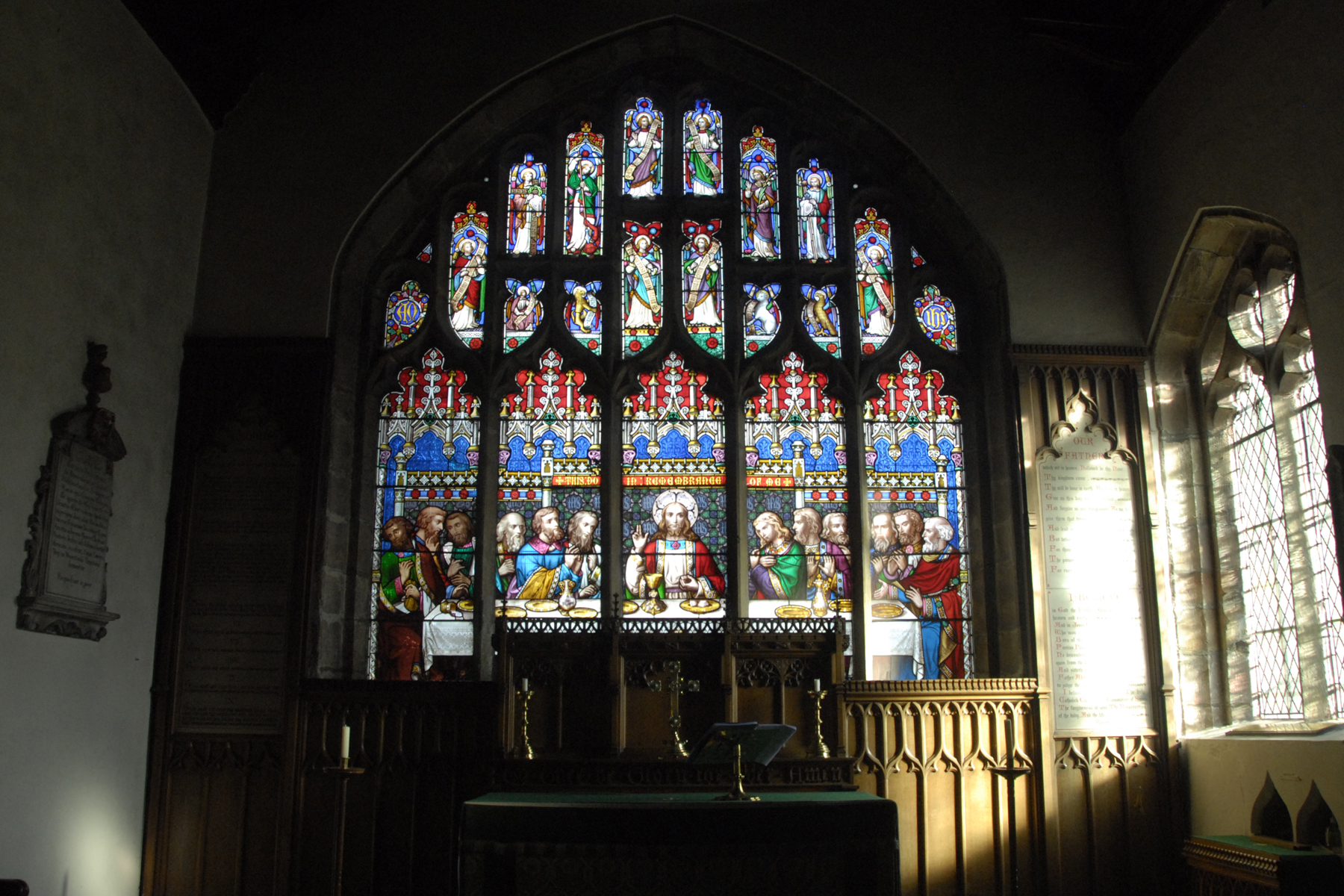
East window in the Church of St Anne, Catterick

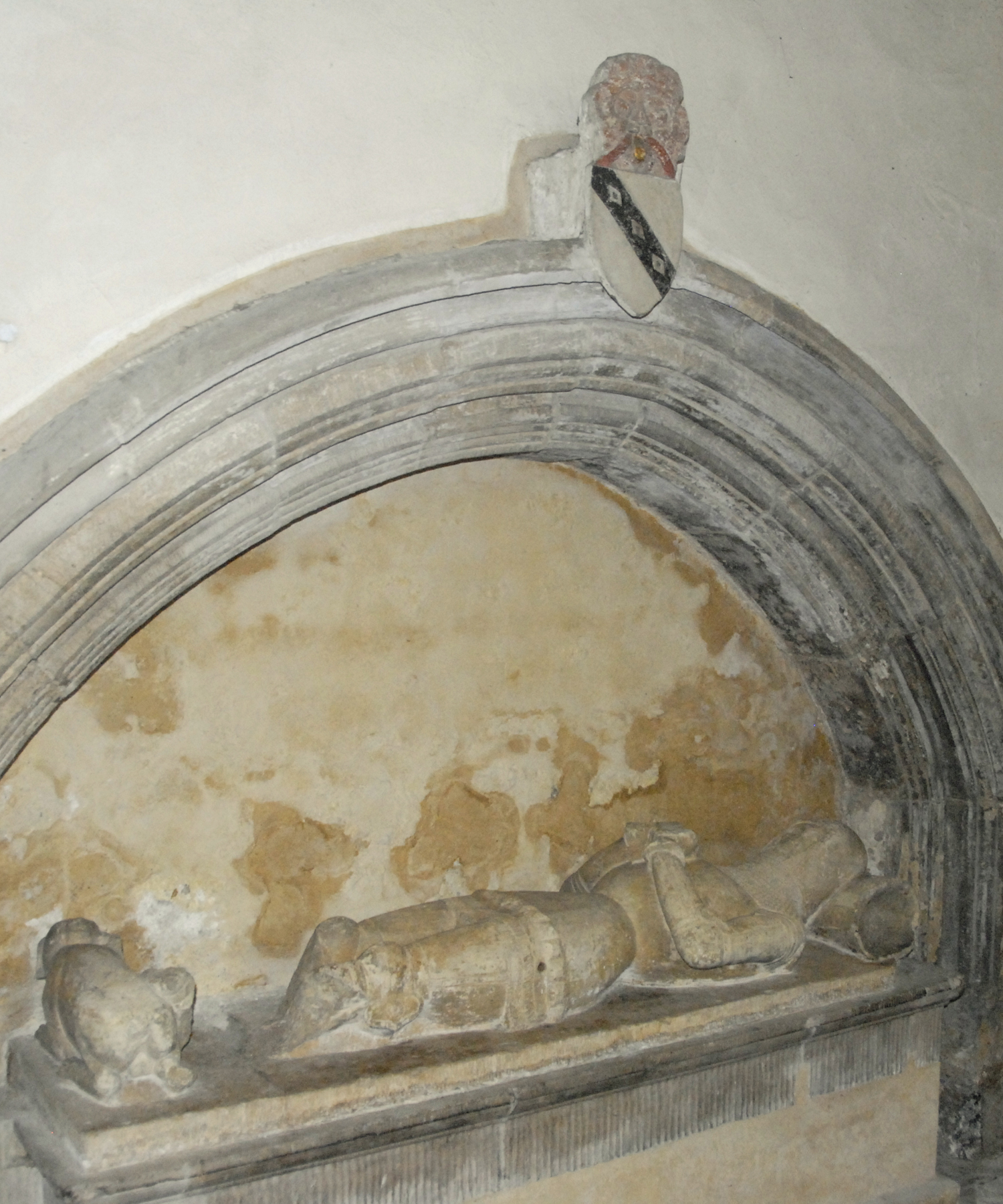
Effigy of Sir Walter Urswick in the Church of St Anne, Catterick
