= Kirkby Fleetham =

Village in North Yorkshire, England

Coordinates: 54°20′45″N 1°33′51″W

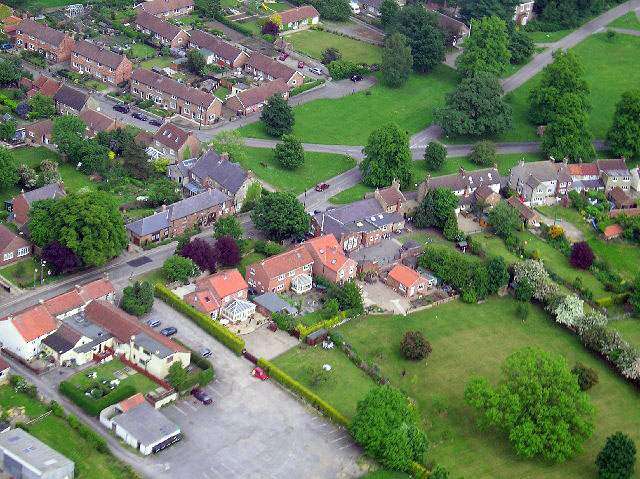
- Western end of Kirkby Fleetham

- Location within North Yorkshire
- Population: 560 (2011 census)
- OS grid reference: SE284945
  - London: 205 mi (330 km) SE
- Unitary authority: North Yorkshire
- Ceremonial county: North Yorkshire
- Region: Yorkshire and the Humber
- Country: England
- Sovereign state: United Kingdom
- Post town: NORTHALLERTON
- Postcode district: DL7
- Police: North Yorkshire
- Fire: North Yorkshire
- Ambulance: Yorkshire
- UK Parliament: Richmond and Northallerton

Kirkby Fleetham is a village in the county of North Yorkshire, England about 1 mile (1.6 km) east of the A1(M) road. Along with the two nearby villages of Great Fencote and Little Fencote it forms the civil parish of Kirkby Fleetham and Fencote. At the 2011 census, it was recorded as having a population of 560.

== History ==
There were two distinct villages named Kirkby and Fleetham at one time. Both are mentioned in the Domesday Book as Cherchebi and Fleetha both belonging to the lands of Count Alan of Brittany. The nearby hamlets of Gt and Lt Fencote are referred to in the Fleetham entry as the Fencotes. The lands of Fleetham before the Norman Conquest were owned by Gamli, son of Karli and Uhtred. After 1086 the manor was granted to Odo the chamberlain. The lands around Kirkby remained with Aldred (Eldred) throughout that time period. The name derives from a combination of kirkju-býr, Old Norse for village with a church, flēot the Old English for small stream and hām the Old English for farm.

The manor of Kirkby was passed to Aldred's son Gospatric, whose daughter Godareda succeeded to his lands, but a clear line of succession does not emerge again until William Giffard in the thirteenth century, whose demesne lordship subsequently lapsed. The demesne titles were then in the possession of the Stapleton family until 1514 when Sir Thomas Metham let the lands to the Conyers. The heirs of the Methen family sold the manor in 1600 to Leonard Smelt. On the death in 1740 of Leonard Smelt, the M.P. for Northallerton, the manor passed to the Aislabie family who, via the distaff side, held it until 1845. At the turn of the twentieth century it passed to the Courage family.

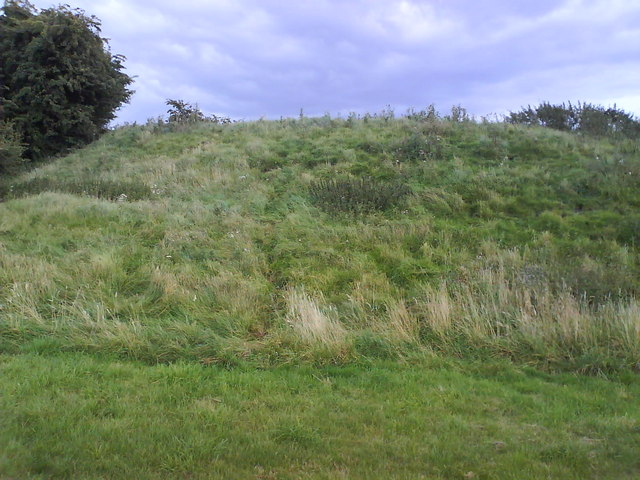
Castle Mound

The manor of Fleetham passed to the Scrope family of Castle Bolton in the thirteenth century. It was passed down that line of descent via Lord Fauconberg and the Darcy family until 1670 when it was conveyed to Richard Smelt, younger brother of the then lord of Kirkby, thus uniting the two manors.

The moated site in the parish at grid reference SE284942, south of the Three Tuns Inn, is a scheduled ancient monument. It is the site of moated manor house, built in about 1314, on the site of an earlier motte and bailey castle.

== Community ==
The village has a Church of England Primary School. It is within the catchment area of Northallerton School for Secondary education to the age of eighteen. There is a local Pub/Bed & Breakfast called The Black Horse and the village has a Shop/Post office.

== Governance and geography ==
The village lies within the Richmond and Northallerton UK Parliament constituency. From 1974 to 2023 it was part of the Hambleton District, it is now administered by the unitary North Yorkshire Council.

The River Swale runs close to the village on the east side and the A1 motorway runs approx 1 mile (1.6 km) to the west of the village. The village also lies under the landing flight path of RAF Leeming. It lies 5.3 miles (8.5 km) west of the County town of Northallerton, 3.5 miles (5.6 km) south east of Catterick and 4 miles (6.4 km) north east of Bedale.

== Demography (of civil parish area) ==
Population
Year	1801	1811	1821	1831	1841	1851	1881	1891	1901	1911	1921	1931	1951	1961	2001	2011
Total	443	480	566	625	657	605	552	565	579	565	515	460	472	397	486	560

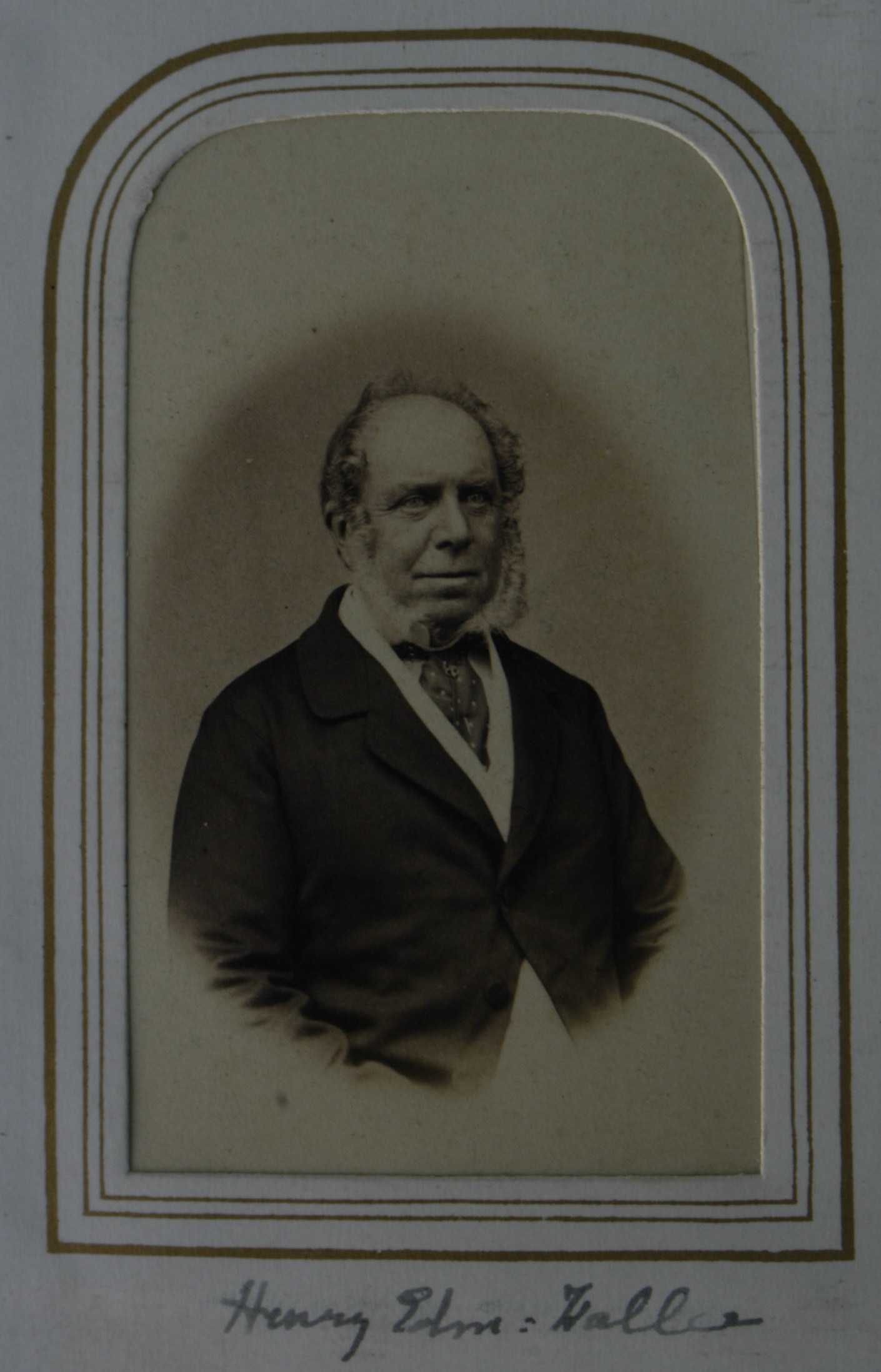
_{Harry Edmund Waller, JP, DL (1804–69), of Farmington and (from 1845 to 1869) of Kirkby Fleetham.}

=== 2001 Census ===
According to the 2001 UK Census, the parish was 46.5% male and 53.5% female of the total population of 486. The religious make-up was 79.2% Christian with the rest stating no religion. The ethnic distribution was 99.4% White with a small Chinese/Other Ethnic minority. There were 238 dwellings.

=== 2011 Census ===
According to the 2011 UK Census, the parish had a total population of 560 with 48.75% male and 51.25% female. The religious make-up was 71.1% Christian with the rest stating no religion. The ethnic distribution was 98.4% White with a small Mixed Ethnic minority. There were 252 dwellings.

== Religion ==
St Mary's Church, Kirkby Fleetham was built between the 12th and 15th centuries and was fully restored in 1871. It is a grade II* listed building and contains a monument by the sculptor John Flaxman to William Lawrence of Kirkby Fleetham Hall in the form of the bust of a young man with his mourning wife Anne Sophie. It has three bells and registers that go back to 1570.

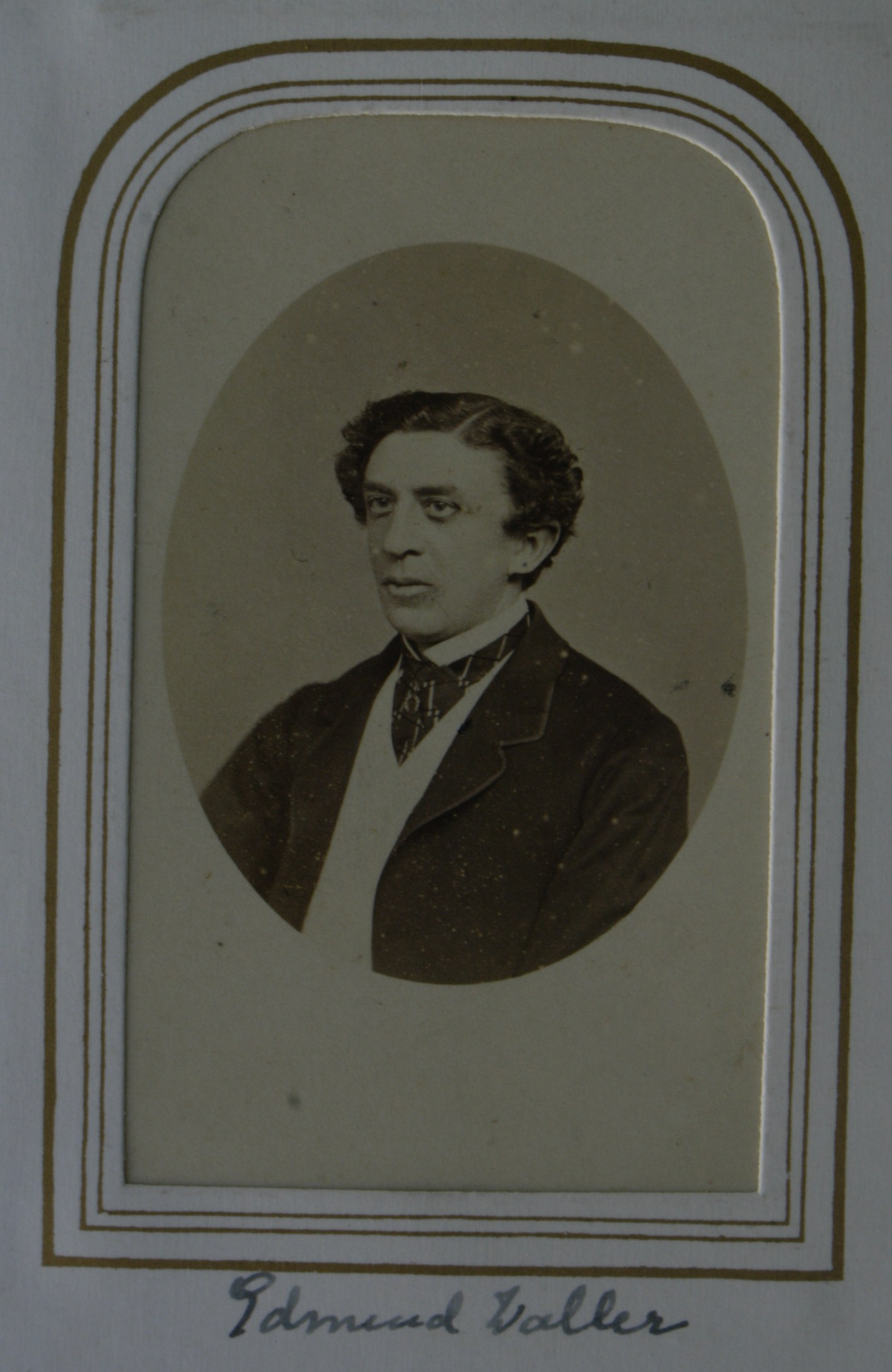
_{Edmund Waller VI or VII, (1828–98), JP, DL. Owned Kirby Fleetham estate, 1869–1889.}

== Notable buildings ==
=== Kirkby Fleetham Hall ===
Kirkby Fleetham Hall

Kirkby Fleetham Hall is a grade II* listed 18th-century country house which stands a mile to the north of the village.

=== Pictures of Kirkby Fleetham Hall ===
Kirkby Fleetham Hall's saloon pre 1889. A portrait of Mrs. Edmund Waller (Lucy Georgiana Elwes, d.1878, an aunt of Henry John Elwes) is visible in the left corner.

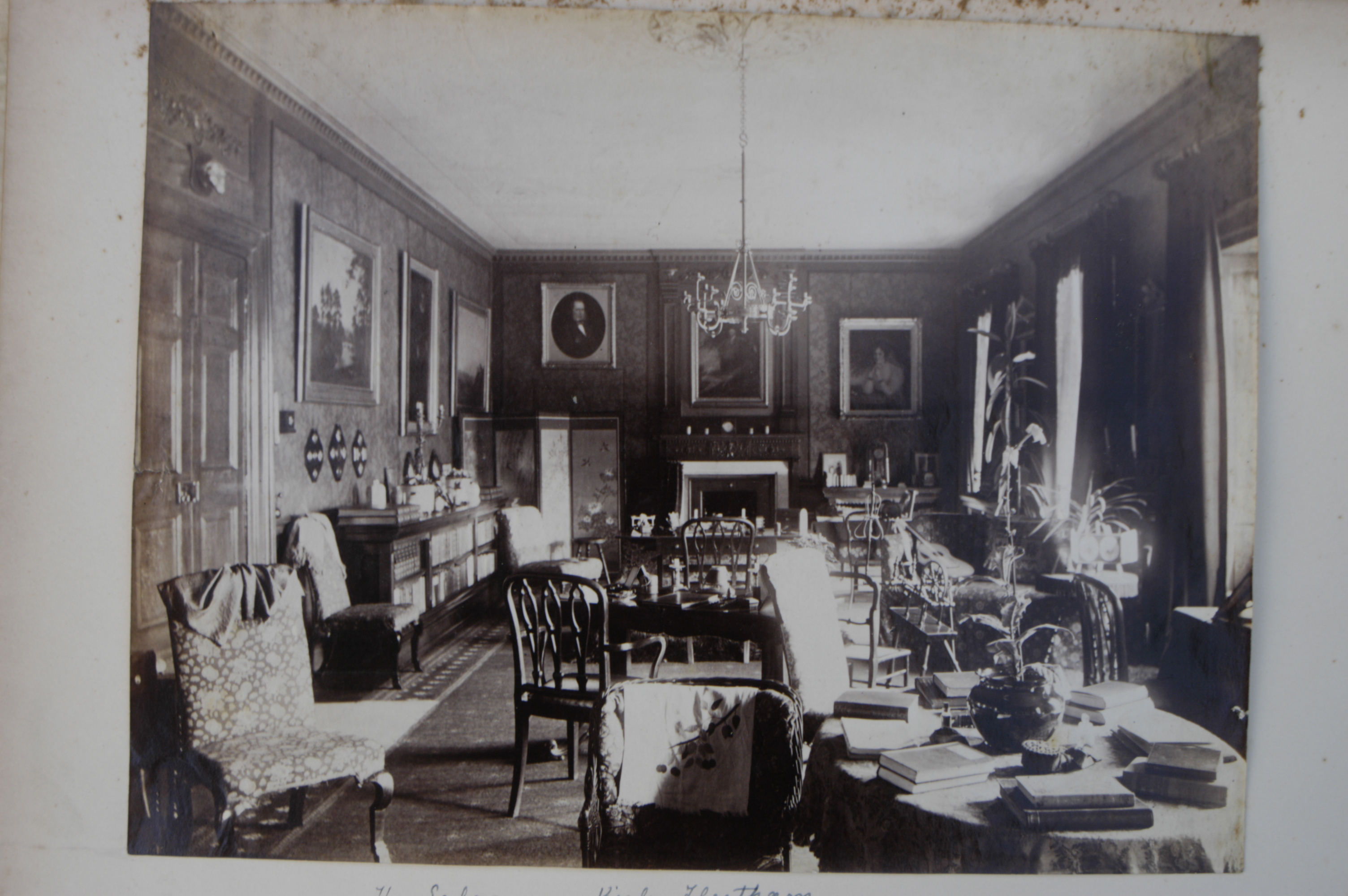
Kirkby Fleetham Hall's saloon pre 1889. A portrait of Harry Edmund Waller III, JP, DL (1804–1869) is visible in the left corner.

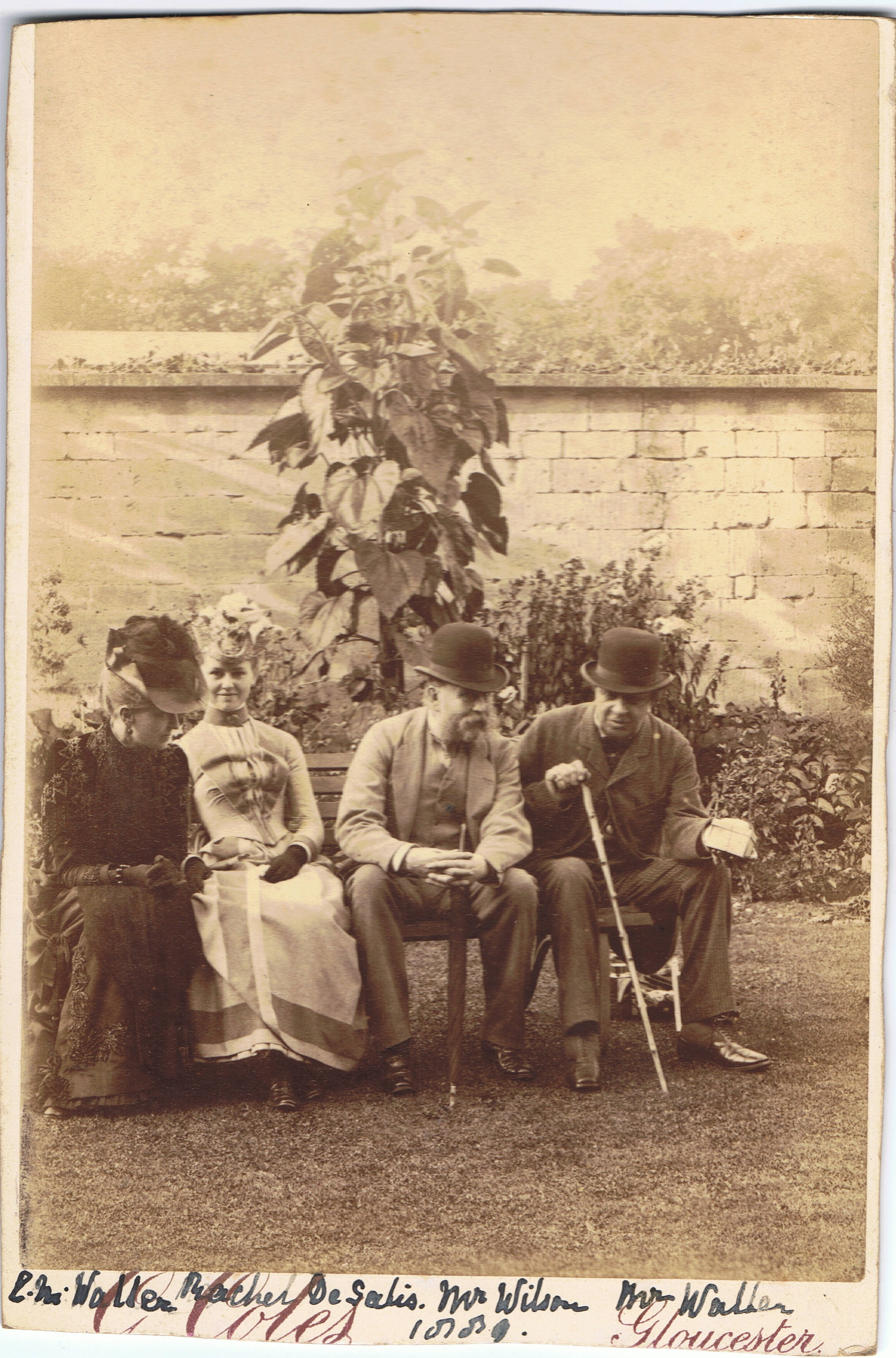
Edmund Waller (1828–1898) of Farmington & Kirkby Fleetham, with second wife, daughter (only child, Rachel (1868–1954)) and a friend, 1889, the year he sold Kirkby Fleetham and moved to Farmington, and the year his daughter married Cecil Fane De Salis.

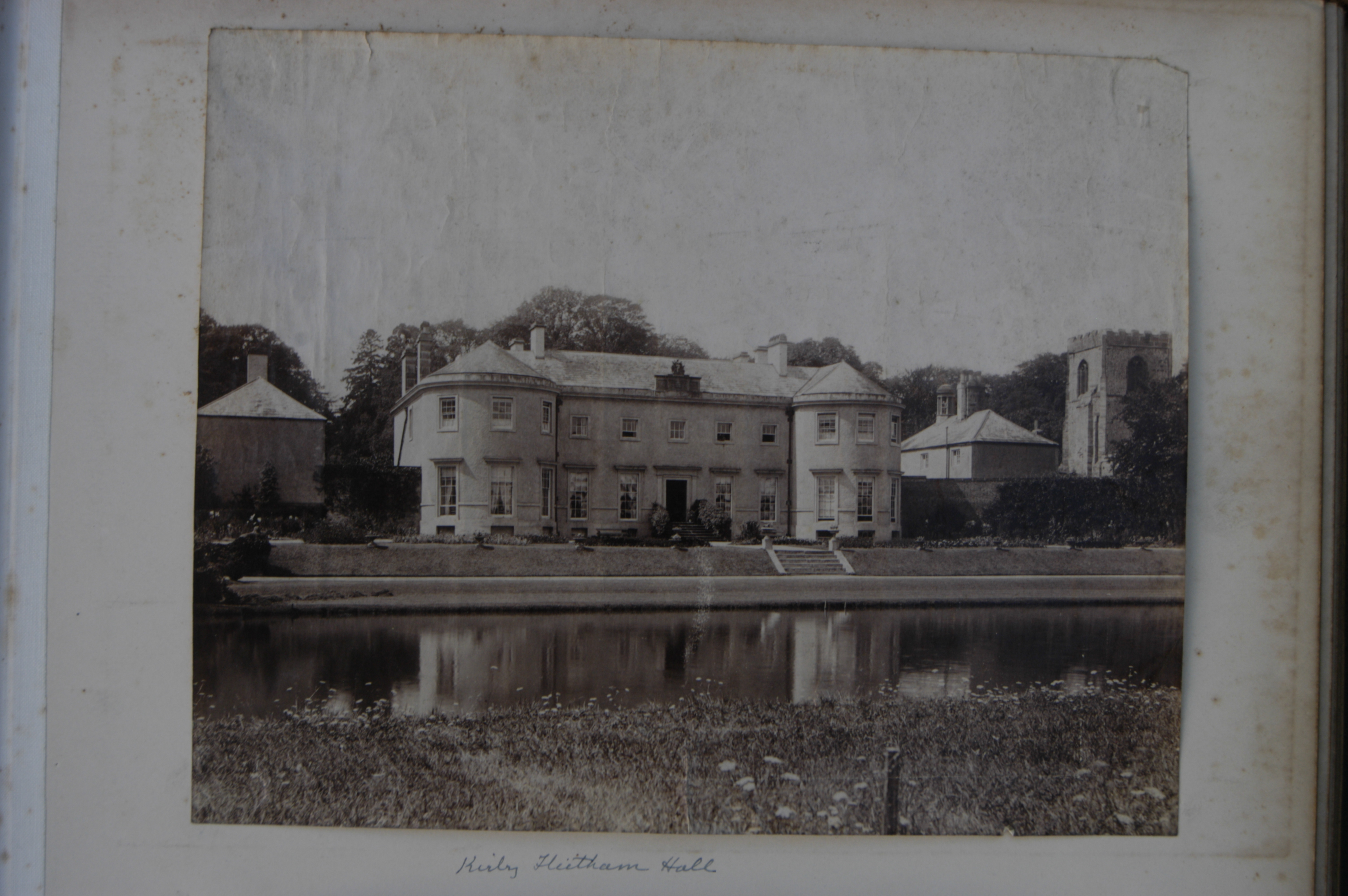
Kirkby Fleetham Hall, circa 1889, from an album made up by Rachel Waller (1868–1954).

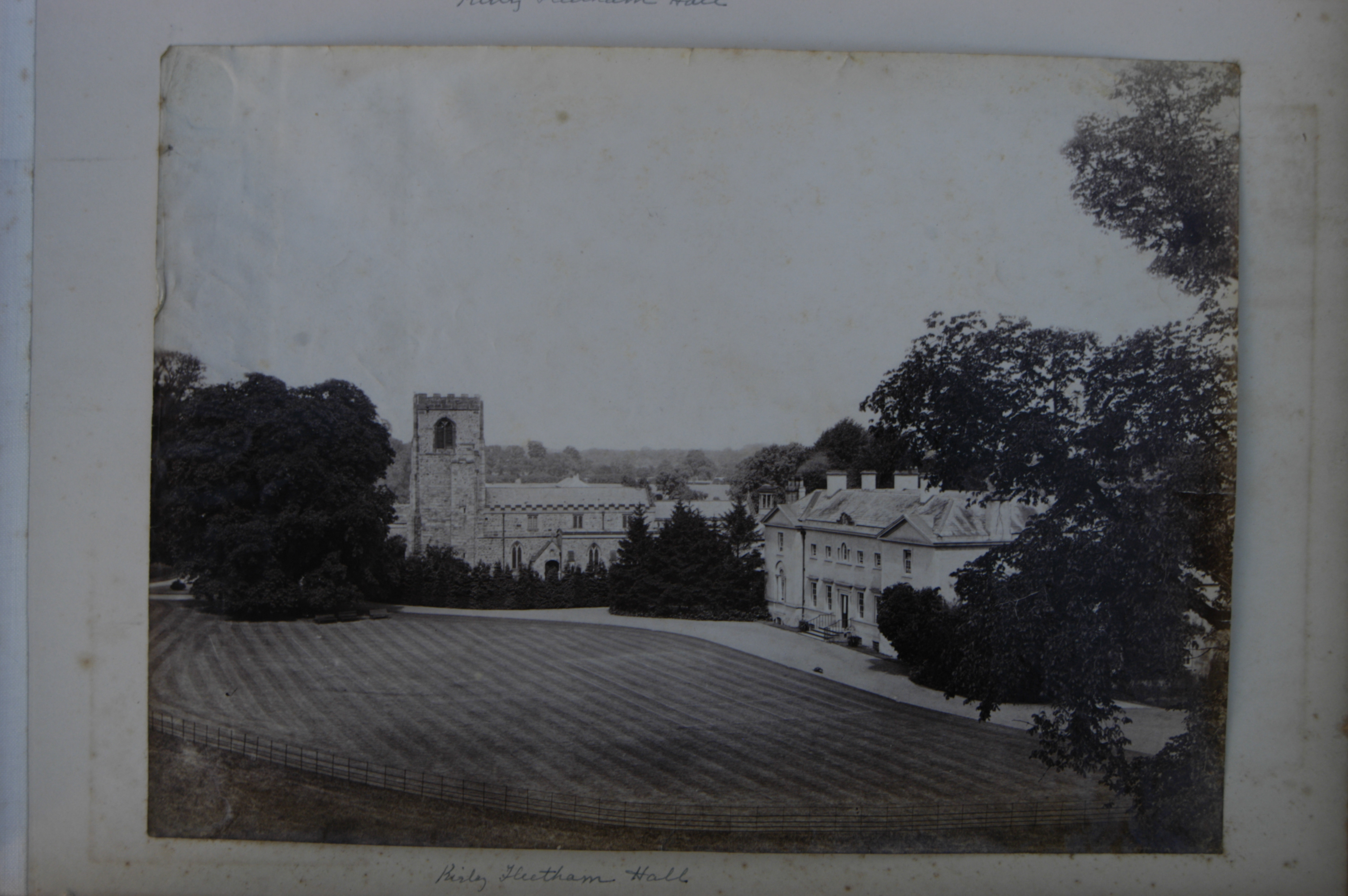
Kirkby Fleetham, circa 1889, featuring its lawn, from an album made up by Rachel Waller (1868–1954), who grew up there.

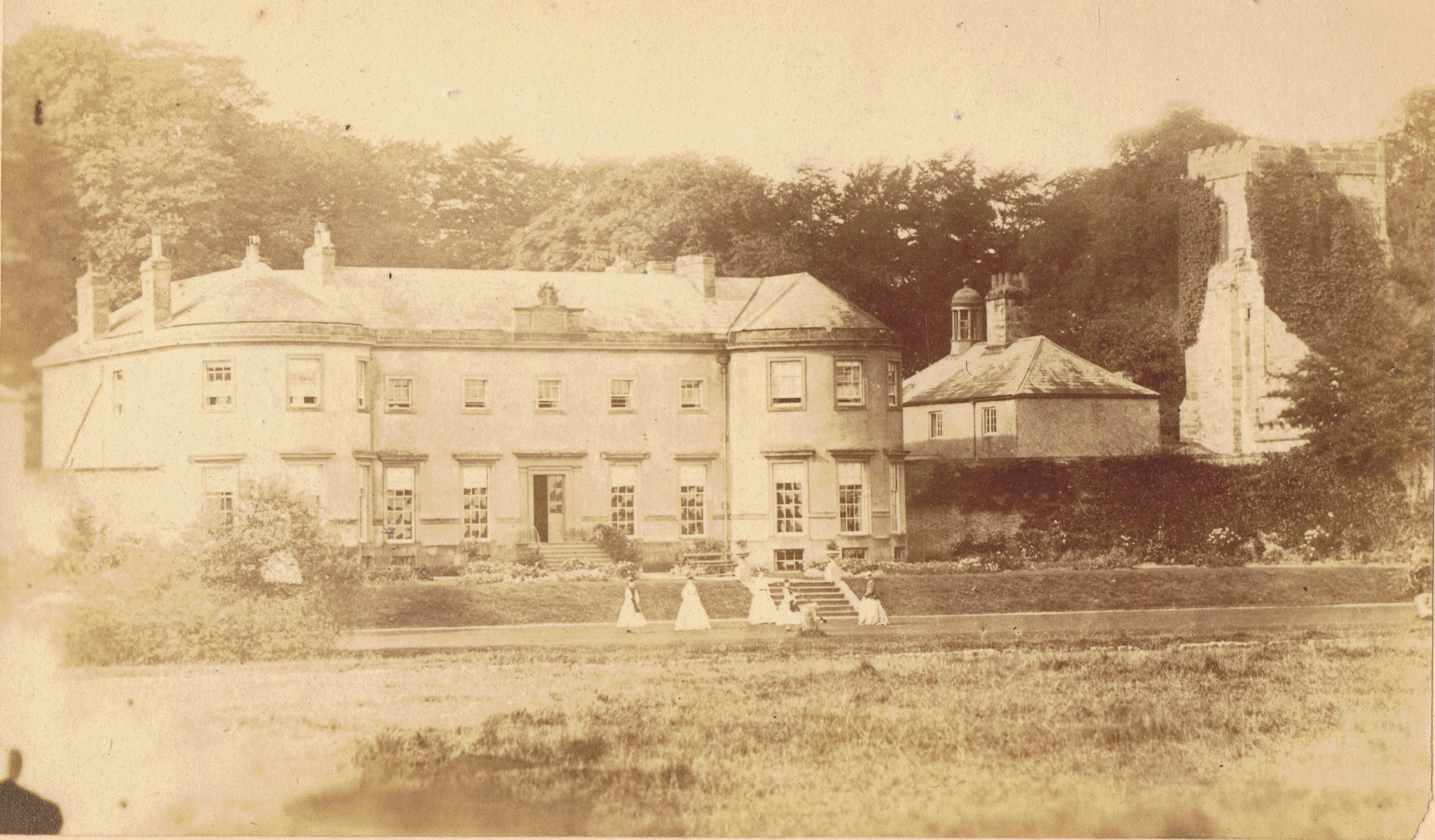
1860s or 70s.

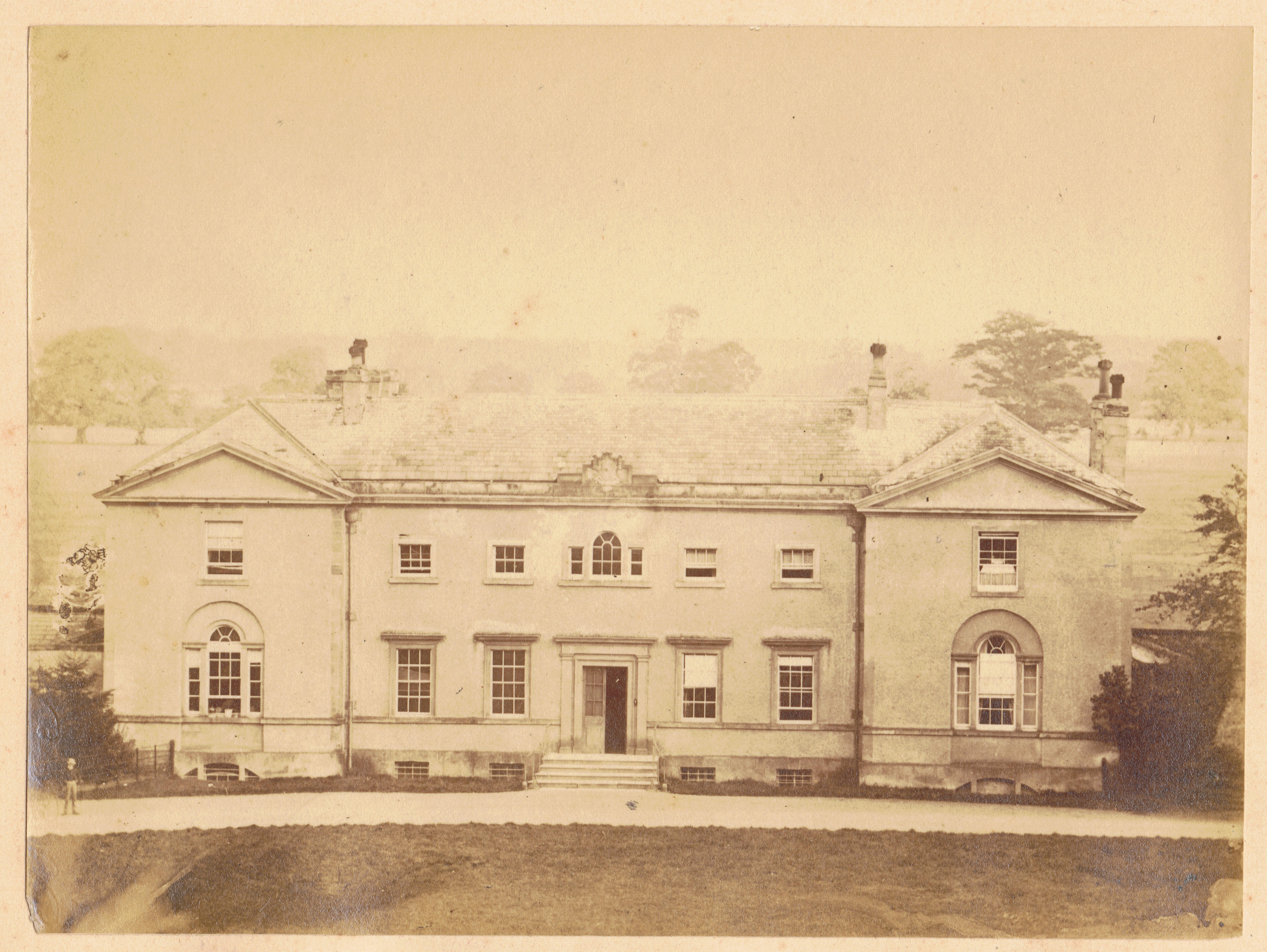
1860s or 70s.
