= Listed buildings in Appleton East and West =

Appleton East and West is a civil parish in the county of North Yorkshire, England. It contains four listed buildings that are recorded in the National Heritage List for England. All the listed buildings are designated at Grade II, the lowest of the three grades, which is applied to "buildings of national importance and special interest". The parish is mainly rural, and contains the settlements of East Appleton and West Appleton. The listed buildings consist of three houses and a former estate gashouse.

== Buildings ==
Name and location	Photograph	Date	Notes
The Manor House; 54.35700°N 1.63961°W	—	Early 17th century	Also known as East Appleton Hall, it is a former manor house in stone, with a tile roof, stone coped gables and shaped kneelers. There are two storeys and an H-shaped plan, with a central range of four bays, single-bay cross wings, and a lower two-storey wing to the west. The south front has a plinth and quoins, and it contains a doorway in a quoined chamfered surround with a triangular soffit to the lintels, and a hood mould. Most of the windows have chamfered mullions.
Rudd Hall; 54.34855°N 1.62824°W		Late 18th to 19th century	A country house that has been altered and extended. It is rendered, with sandstone dressings, and a hipped stone slate roof. There are two storeys and fronts of five bays. In the middle of the south front is a doorway with an architrave, a fluted frieze and a cornice on consoles. The windows are sashes in architraves, with wedge lintels scored as flat arches. In the centre of the west front is a two-storey canted bay window, and to the right is a doorway in an architrave.
Woodfield House; 54.34427°N 1.65796°W	—	Early to mid 19th century	The house is in stone, with quoins, a floor band and a tile roof. There are two storeys, three bays, and single-storey flanking bays with stepped parapets. In the centre is a doorway, above which is a blind window. The other windows are sashes with wedge lintels and keystones.
Gashouse; 54.34453°N 1.65416°W	—	Mid to late 19th century	A disused estate gashouse in red brick, with a Welsh slate roof that has a raised and loured apex. There is a single storey with an attic, and two bays, and a single-storey range at right angles. In the centre is a blocked doorway, and in the upper floor are windows, all with segmental-arched lintels, and in the gable is a blocked oculus.
