= Fencote =

Village in North Yorkshire, England

Coordinates: 54.33735°N 1.56484°W

Great Fencote
- Location within North Yorkshire
- OS grid reference: SE283936
- Unitary authority: North Yorkshire
- Ceremonial county: North Yorkshire
- Region: Yorkshire and the Humber
- Country: England
- Sovereign state: United Kingdom
- Post town: NORTHALLERTON
- Postcode district: DL7
- Police: North Yorkshire
- Fire: North Yorkshire
- Ambulance: Yorkshire

Fencote or Great Fencote is a village in the county of North Yorkshire, England. It is about 1 mi (1.6 km) east of the A1(M) motorway. It has a smaller village nearby called Little Fencote. Kirkby Fleetham lies to the north.

From 1974 to 2023 it was part of the Hambleton District, it is now administered by the unitary North Yorkshire Council.
