= St Mary's Church, Kirkby Fleetham =

Church in North Yorkshire, England

St Mary's Church'
- Church of St Mary, Kirkby Fleetham
- The church, in 2010
- St Mary's Church'
- 54°21′23″N 1°34′08″W
- OS grid reference: SE 28121 95722
- Location: Kirkby Fleetham, North Yorkshire
- Country: England
- Denomination: Anglican
- Website: A church near you

History
- Status: Parish church
- Dedication: St Mary

Architecture
- Functional status: Active
- Architectural type: Norman; Early English; Decorated

Administration
- Diocese: Diocese of Leeds
- Archdeaconry: Richmond and Craven
- Deanery: Wensley
- Benefice: Lower Swale
- Parish: Kirkby Fleetham with Langton on Swale and Scruton

Clergy
- Vicar: Jenni Lane

Listed Building – Grade II*
- Designated: 22 August 1966
- Reference no.: 1150928

St Mary's Church is the parish church of Kirkby Fleetham, a village in North Yorkshire, in England. Some parts of the church date back to Norman times, and the building displays three distinct types or architecture. The church was surrounded by a village, but this was depopulated, with no clear reason why. The churchyard was closed to burials in the 19th century.

== History ==
The first church on the site was built in the Viking period, but at the time of Domesday, Fleetham was listed as having a vicar and church, and no church was listed in Kirkby. Originally, the church was in its own settlement of Kirkby, and Fleetham was a separate settlement, both mentioned in the Domesday Book. The church was rebuilt in stone in the 12th century, from which period the Norman south doorway survives. The village around the church was abandoned at some point, but it is not known why. The nave and south chapel date from the 13th century, while the north aisle and west tower were added in the 15th century. The church was largely rebuilt in 1871, to a design by Henry Woodyer, which provided a new north aisle and stained glass. The building was grade II* listed in 1966.

The church is built of stone and has roofs of lead and Welsh slate. It consists of a nave with a clerestory, a north aisle, a south porch, a south chapel, a chancel with a north vestry, and a west tower; the chancel measures 34 feet 2 inches (10.41 m) by 19 feet 10 inches (6.05 m), the nave is 55 feet 4 inches (16.87 m) by 18 feet 10 inches (5.74 m) and the north aisle is 56 feet 7 inches (17.25 m) by 12 feet 2 inches (3.71 m). The tower has three stages, diagonal buttresses, a south stair turret, bands, two-light bell openings, and an embattled parapet. The tower is very large and was fortified at some point, possibly to allow safe refuge for parishioners against marauding Scots, (nearby St Gregory's at Bedale has a tower that was similarly fortified.) There is also an embattled parapet along the nave. Due to some stones from pre-12th century being used, the church structure displays three different types of architecture; Norman, Early English and Decorated.

The south doorway is Norman and round-arched, with one order and zigzag decoration. Inside is a Norman font, which has been reworked, an effigy of Nicholas Stapleton, who died in 1290, and a monument to William Lawrence, carved in 1785 by John Flaxman. The effigy of Stapelton was previously under an arch in the north wall of the nave, but the restoration of 1871 saw it moved into the chancel. The memorial to William Smelt MP, who died in 1755 and is buried in the church, was restored in 2020. There are stained glass windows by Hardman & Co. in the chancel, south chapel, and the aisles.

The churchyard was closed to burials in the 19th century.

== Parish, benefice and clergy ==
The church is part of the Kirkby Fleetham with Langton on Swale and Scruton parish, the benefice of Lower Swale, in the Deanery of Wensley, the Archdeaconry of Richmond & Craven, and the Diocese of Leeds. Historically, the church was in the Deanery of Catterick, which was within the Diocese of Chester. The incumbent of Kirkby Fleetham is the vicar for the whole benefice of Lower Swale, and is Jenni Lane. Since around 1380, the church has been served by 36 vicars.

The right of advowson for the church lay with the Knights Templar in 1312, the it passed to Henry le Scrope, Nicholas Stapleton and then by Roger de Sheffield on lease from the king in 1334. It late became the possession of the Knights Templar again, then the Knights Hospitaller, thereafter passing to the monks of Mount St John. After the dissolution of the monasteries, the advowson passed to the crown, then to the Bishop of Ripon, though at least one vicar was appointed by Elisabeth Lawrence of Studley Royal who had connections at Kirkby Fleetham.

== Notable people ==
- Leonard Smelt was baptized in the church

== See also ==
- Grade II* listed churches in North Yorkshire (district)
- Listed buildings in Kirkby Fleetham with Fencote
