= Appleton East and West =

Civil parish in North Yorkshire, England

Coordinates: 54.351°N 1.640°W

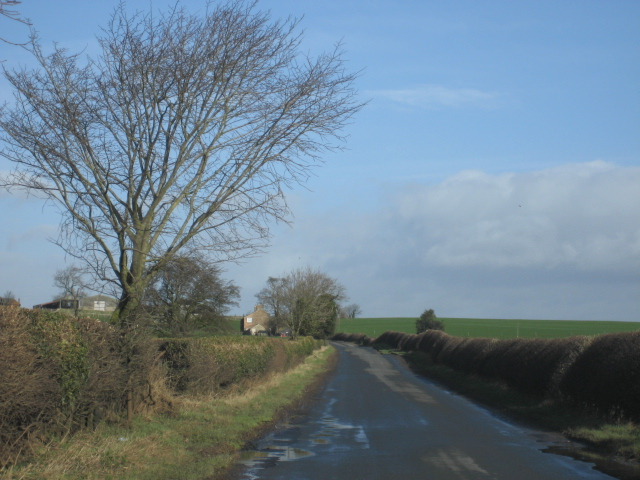
Approaching East Appleton

Appleton East and West is a civil parish in the county of North Yorkshire, England. It contains the villages East Appleton and West Appleton, and had a population of 76 according to the 2001 census, remaining at less than 100 in the 2011 Census. From this date population details are maintained within the parish of Hornby. The settlement consists of two farms, with several water bodies in the area.

From 1974 to 2023 it was part of the district of Richmondshire, it is now administered by the unitary North Yorkshire Council.

In the 1870s, Appleton East and West was described as

"A township in Catterick parish, N. R. Yorkshire; 5½ miles SE of Richmond. Acres, 1,583. Real property, £2,812. Pop., 115. Houses, 16"

== See also ==
- Listed buildings in Appleton East and West
