= Kirkby Fleetham Hall =

Country house in North Yorkshire, England

Coordinates: 54°21′21″N 1°34′07″W

The hall, in 2020

Kirkby Fleetham Hall is a historic building in Kirkby Fleetham, a village in North Yorkshire, in England.

The manor of Kirkby Fleetham descended through the Stapleton family, then the Melthams, who sold it in 1600 to the Smelt family, with owners including Leonard Smelt. The property was bought in the 1720s by John Aislabie, MP for Ripon and Chancellor of the Exchequer, for his son William Aislabie, also MP for Ripon. The present house was built in the mid-1700s by William for his daughter, Ann Sophie, who had married William Lawrence. Subsequently, it was left by William's granddaughter, Sophia Elizabeth Lawrence, to her second-cousin once-removed, Harry Edmund Waller, thence to his son Edmund Waller VI, who sold it in 1889 to Edward Courage of the Courage brewing family. Since then much of the estate has been sold off. The hall has gone through several guises including hotel and "country retreat". It has been a family home since 2003 and in 2024 it was made available for a handful of exclusive weddings and events per year. It was grade II* listed in 1966.

The country house is built of rendered stone with stone dressings and hipped roofs of stone slate and lead. The main range has two storeys, a basement and attics, and seven bays, to the left is a link wall and a one-storey pavilion, and to the right is a single-storey three-bay wing. The main range has a sill band, the middle five bays have a cornice and a blocking course, and the outer bays project under pediments with moulded cornices. Steps lead up to a central doorway with an architrave, a Doric surround, a frieze and a cornice. In the ground floor of the outer bays are Venetian windows, and the other windows on the front are sashes, the window above the doorway tripartite. In the attic are five dormers with sashes. On the pavilion is a domed cupola with a bell. The north front has eleven bays, the outer three bays on each side projecting and bowed. Inside, the servants' staircase dates from about 1785, while the main staircase is 19th century. There are some early doorcases and cornices, and the dining room has a Neoclassical fireplace.

== See also ==
- Grade II* listed buildings in North Yorkshire (district)
- Listed buildings in Kirkby Fleetham with Fencote
