= Listed buildings in Catterick, North Yorkshire =

Catterick is a civil parish in the county of North Yorkshire, England. It contains 36 listed buildings that are recorded in the National Heritage List for England. Of these, one is listed at Grade I, the highest of the three grades, and the others are at Grade II, the lowest grade. The parish contains the village of Catterick and the surrounding area. To the south of the village is Marne Barracks, formerly RAF Catterick, which contains five listed buildings. Most of the other listed buildings are houses and associated structures, shops and cottages, and the others include a church, a tombstone in the churchyard and its northern gateway, public houses, and a war memorial.

== Key ==
Grade	Criteria
I	Buildings of exceptional interest, sometimes considered to be internationally important
II	Buildings of national importance and special interest

== Buildings ==
Name and location	Photograph	Date	Notes	Grade
Church of St Anne; 54.37675°N 1.63190°W		1412	Chapels were added to the church in 1491 and in 1505, and further alterations were made in 1872. The church is built in sandstone with a Welsh slate roof, and is in Perpendicular style. It consists of a nave with a clerestory, north and south aisles, a south porch, a chancel with side chapels and a north vestry, and a west tower. The tower has three stages, a stair turret in the southeast corner, a three-light west window, a clock face, two-light bell openings, and an embattled parapet with corner finials. The porch has a doorway with a pointed arch and a moulded surround, coats of arms, and a sundial in the gable, and inside are stone benches and a stoup. The east window has five lights, above which is a hood mould and an oculus with three lights.	I
21 and 23 High Street; 54.37691°N 1.63073°W	—	Late 17th century or earlier	A shop and a house, they are rendered, with tile roofs, and each part has one bay. The shop on the left has two storeys and an attic, with the gable end facing the road. In the ground floor is a doorway on the left and a three-light shop window. The upper floor contains a two-light casement window, and in the attic is a blocked three-light mullioned window. The gable is coped, and the kneeler has a Jacobean finial. The house has two storeys, in the ground floor is a doorway and a sash window, and the upper floor contains a horizontally-sliding sash window. At the rear are chamfered mullioned windows.	II
25 High Street; 54.37696°N 1.63079°W	—	Late 17th century or earlier	A rendered shop with a tile roof, two storeys and an attic, a single bay, and a rear wing. On the front is a doorway, and a casement window with a chamfered surround in each floor. At the rear are quoins, a single-light window in the ground floor, and above is a blocked chamfered mullioned window with a hood mould.	II
27 High Street; 54.37700°N 1.63082°W	—	Late 17th century or earlier	A rendered shop with a pantile roof, two storeys, a single bay, and a rear wing. In the ground floor is a square shop bay window, and the upper floor contains a sash window in an architrave.	II
Tombstone of Thomas Roodes; 54.37663°N 1.63206°W	—	1706	The tombstone is in the churchyard of the Church of St Anne, to the left of the porch. It consists of a sandstone slab about 1 metre (3 ft 3 in) high, and has a curved top with scrolls about a central skull and cross-bones, from which hang drapes.	II
41A High Street; 54.37728°N 1.63145°W		1709	The house is rendered, with stone dressings, chamfered rusticated quoins on the left, and a pantile roof with stone coping and a shaped kneeler on the left. There are three storeys and one bay. To the right is a doorway with a chamfered quoined surround and a tripartite lintel. In each of the lower two floors is a sash window with a stone surround and a keystone, and in the top floor is a horizontally-sliding sash window.	II
43 High Street; 54.37730°N 1.63156°W		1709	A rendered house with stone dressings, chamfered rusticated quoins on the right, and a pantile roof with stone coping and a shaped kneeler on the right. There are three storeys and three bays. The doorway has an architrave with scrolled splayed bases, imposts, a keystone carved with the date, a moulded frieze, and a swan-neck pediment with paterae on scrolls. To its left are two sash windows with cement surrounds, to the right and in the middle floor are sashes in architraves with keystones, and the top floor contains two casement windows and a horizontally-sliding sash.	II
Gates and gate piers, Church of St Anne; 54.37707°N 1.63266°W	—	Early 18th century	The gate piers flanking the northern entrance to the churchyard are in sandstone. They have a square plan, and each pier has chamfered rustication on a plain base, with a simple cornice and a convex cap. The gates are in wrought iron.	II
Oak Tree Inn; 54.37503°N 1.63358°W		1733	The public house is rendered, and has a pantile roof with stone coping and shaped kneelers, one carved with the date. In the front is a doorway, and the windows are a mix of casements and horizontally-sliding sashes.	II
12 High Street; 54.37689°N 1.63019°W		Mid 18th century	The house is built in river cobbles with some brick, stone dressings, a stone slate eaves course, and a pantile roof, with coping and a shaped kneeler to the south. There are two storeys, a double depth plan, a front range of three bays, and a rear wing. The central doorway has a quoined surround, a rectangular fanlight, and a lintel with a keystone. This is flanked by canted bay windows with colonnettes at the corners. In the upper floor are sash windows with wedge lintels, and at the rear is a bow window.	II
14 High Street; 54.37697°N 1.63027°W		Mid 18th century	A stone house with a pantile roof, two storeys and three bays. The central doorway has a quoined surround, and is flanked by canted bay windows. In the upper floor are sash windows with wedge lintels.	II
13 The Bank; 54.37666°N 1.63344°W	—	Mid 18th century	The house is in stone, with quoins on the right, and a tile roof with stone coping and a shaped kneeler on the right. There are two storeys and two bays. In the centre is a doorway, and the windows are sashes in architraves, with wedge lintels and deep keystones.	II
15 The Bank; 54.37676°N 1.63349°W	—	Mid 18th century	A stone house with quoins on the left, a stone slate course at the eaves, and a roof in pantile and stone slate with stone coping and a shaped kneeler on the left. There are two storeys and three bays. The doorway on the right has a three-pane fanlight, and a lintel grooved to resemble voussoirs. The windows are sashes in architraves, and all the openings have wedge lintels and deep keystones.	II
Academy Buildings; 54.37657°N 1.63088°W	—	Mid 18th century	A pair of stone houses, with quoins, and a pantile roof with stone coping and shaped kneelers. There are two storeys and four bays, and the entry is at the rear. On the front are sash windows with stone surrounds, those in the ground floor continuing to the ground, and tripartite keystones.	II
Angel Inn; 54.37670°N 1.63069°W		Mid 18th century	Originally a coaching inn, later a public house, it is on a corner site, partly roughcast and partly rendered, and has a tile roof, hipped on the corner and with concrete coping and shaped kneelers elsewhere. There are two storeys and an L-shaped plan, with five bays on Low Green and six on High Street. In the left bay in Low Green is a basket arched carriage entrance with a tripartite keystone. The third bay contains a doorway, and elsewhere on Low Green and in the left bay in High Street are sash windows, all with tripartite keystones. In the other bays in High Street, the ground floor projects, the bays divided by paired Tuscan pilasters, and in the upper floor are sash windows.	II
Barn, stables and Oran Cottages; 54.36252°N 1.61480°W	—	18th century	A threshing barn with stables, and a cartshed converted into three cottages. They are in brick and stone, with roofs of pantile, stone slate and Welsh slate. The barn has nine bays, and each cottage has two storeys and two bays.	II
Former County Hotel; 54.37706°N 1.63040°W		1755	A pair of houses, at one time a hotel, they are roughcast, on a plinth, and have a tile roof with stone coping and shaped kneelers. There are two storeys, a T-shaped plan, a front range of five bays, and a rear wing. On the front are two doorways, the right one with Tuscan half-columns, a fanlight, a frieze with paterae and anthemion, and a cornice. The left doorway is plainer, and has a fanlight. Flanking the doorways are three segmental bow windows with fluted pilasters, anthemion on the capitals, and a Greek key decoration on the frieze. The upper floor contains sash windows, and in the rear wing is a segmental bow window.	II
24 Low Green; 54.37621°N 1.63192°W	—	Mid to late 18th century	A house and shop in stone, rendered on the front, with quoins on the right, and a Welsh slate roof with stone coping and a shaped kneeler on the right. There are three storeys, an L-shaped plan, a front range of four bays, and a rear wing. In the third bay is a doorway with a fanlight, flanked by square bay windows in plate glass. In the left bay and the upper floors are sash windows, one in the top floor blind.	II
36 Low Green; 54.37608°N 1.63253°W	—	Mid to late 18th century	The house is in stone with a pantile roof, two storeys and two bays. In the centre is a doorway, and the windows are sash windows, those in the ground floor tripartite and horizontally-sliding.	II
Stepping Stones House and 34 Low Green; 54.37612°N 1.63229°W		Mid to late 18th century	A pair of stone houses, each with two storeys and three bays. Stepping Stone House on the right has a plinth, chamfered rusticated quoins, a sill band, and a Westmorland slate roof with stone coping and ball finials on the kneelers. In the centre is a doorway with an architrave, a frieze with fluting and paterae, and a cornice. This is flanked by canted bay windows, and in the upper floor are sash windows in architraves. At the rear is a round-arched staircase window. No. 34 has a pantile roof, in the ground floor is a single and a double doorway, and between them and in the upper floor are sash windows.	II
44A Low Green; 54.37587°N 1.63368°W	—	Late 18th to early 19th century	A stone house with a pantile roof, two storeys and one bay. The doorway is on the left, there is one sash window in each floor, and all the openings have flat brick arches.	II
50 Low Green; 54.37582°N 1.63399°W	—	Late 18th to early 19th century	The house is in stone, with quoins, and a pantile roof with stone coping and a shaped kneeler on the left. There are two storeys and three bays. The central doorway has a quoined surround and a tripartite keystone, above which is a blind window, and the other windows are sashes.	II
52 Low Green; 54.37580°N 1.63413°W	—	Late 18th to early 19th century	A stone house with a pantile roof, two storeys and two bays. The central doorway has a quoined surround and a tripartite keystone. The windows are sashes, those in the ground floor with tripartite keystones.	II
9 and 11 The Bank; 54.37654°N 1.63338°W	—	Late 18th to early 19th century	A pair of stone houses with quoins and a pantile roof with stone coping on the right. There are two storeys and five bays. The middle bay contains a carriage opening with a four-centred arch, quoined jambs, and voussoirs, above which is a blind window. The left house has a doorway on the left with a sandstone lintel and a keystone. To the right are two canted bay windows, and in the upper floor are casement windows. The right house has a central round-arched doorway with a blocked fanlight containing radial glazing bars. The windows are sashes in architraves, with wedge lintels, those in the ground floor also with keystones.	II
17 The Bank; 54.37686°N 1.63355°W	—	Late 18th to early 19th century	The house is rendered, with stone slate at the eaves, and a roof of pantile and stone slate, hipped on the left. There are two storeys and four bays. The porch in the second bay has a pent roof, and in the outer bays are segmental bow windows with sashes, fluted pilasters, small bosses under the cornice, and lead roofs. The other windows are sashes in architraves.	II
Former laundry northwest of Oran House; 54.36281°N 1.61460°W	—	Early 19th century	The former laundry is in stone, and has a pantile roof with stone copings. There is a single storey and three bays. On the front are two doorways with stone surrounds and interrupted jambs, and the windows are sashes with brick segmental arches.	II
Outbuildings north of Oran House; 54.36287°N 1.61419°W	—	Early 19th century	The two attached outbuildings are in stone, with some brick, and have oversailing eaves, and hipped Welsh slate roofs with lead-covered, timber, louvred ventilators. They have a single storey, each has three bays. The left building has seven irregular sides, the right building has an irregular hexagonal plan, and joining them is a single-bay link. Both buildings have a doorway with interrupted jambs, and casement windows, the left building has a chute, and the right building has quoins.	II
Oran House; 54.36267°N 1.61418°W	—	c. 1830	A house, later divided, in red brick on a partial plinth, with chamfered rusticated quoins, oversailing eaves, and a Westmorland slate roof, the gables with bargeboards, and some with pendants. There are two storeys and six bays, the left three bays gabled, and the right three bays recessed. On the front is a Tudor arched portal and a doorway with a pointed arch and a hood mould. The windows are a mix, and include sashes, some with hood moulds, a mullioned and transomed window with a balustraded balcony, a mullioned and transomed oriel window, canted bay windows, a small lancet window, and a dormer.	II
Chandlers House; 54.37610°N 1.63311°W	—	Early to mid 19th century	The house is in cobbles and stone, with quoins, and a Welsh slate roof, hipped on the left, and with stone coping and a shaped kneeler on the right. There are two storeys and three bays. The doorway has a fanlight, and the windows are sashes in architraves.	II
The Corner House; 54.37593°N 1.63345°W		Early to mid 19th century	Two houses on a corner site, later combined, in stone, with quoins, and a roof of pantile and Welsh slate, hipped in the corner and with stone coping and kneelers elsewhere. There are two storeys, fronts of three bays, with two-bay extensions on both ends. On the front facing The Bank is a central round-arched doorway with a fanlight, flanked by segmental bow windows with sashes, a frieze with raised fluting and paterae, a cornice with mutules, and a lead roof. The upper floor contains sash windows in architraves, with sandstone sills and wedge lintels. The front facing Low Green has two similar bow windows, the left with a doorway, and sash windows above, the middle window blank.	II
Catterick Camp war memorial 54.37973°N 1.63659°W		c. 1920	The memorial commemorates those from Catterick Camp and airfield who were lost in the First World War. It stands on an embankment on the southwest side of Leeming Lane (A6316 road). The memorial is approached by a flight of stone steps flanked by a low wall, and consists of a calvary cross in oak, on which is a painted sculpture of the Crucifixion under an oak canopy. This stands on a four-sided chamfered plinth on a single step, and on the plinth is an inscription and three Cross pattée motifs. It is enclosed by walls at the sides, and at the rear are metal railings with fleur-de-lys finials.	II
Building 68, Marne Barracks; 54.36901°N 1.62708°W	—	1927	A watch office, an early type of control tower, it is in brick with a gabled slate roof, and a single storey. On the south front is a bay window with casements, and on the east front is a doorway under an arch.	II
Building 31, Marne Barracks; 54.37286°N 1.62617°W	—	1935	The officers' mess with accommodation is in red brick with hipped pantile roofs on steel trusses. There is an H-shaped plan consisting of a single-storey range with a parapet, and low links to two-storey bedroom wings with twelve bays. The windows are sashes with brick voussoirs and stone sills.	II
Building 46, Marne Barracks; 54.37106°N 1.62519°W	—	1935	The station offices are in brick with reinforced concrete floors and a slate roof. There is a T-shaped plan with a front range of two storeys and nine bays and a hipped roof, and a single storey rear wing with a double hipped roof, connected by a short link with a flat roof. In the middle of the main range is a double doorway with pilasters and a dated entablature on brackets. The windows are sashes with slightly cambered brick voussoirs and concrete sills. On the roof is a square louvred turret with a lead cupola and a pinnacle.	II
Building 54, Marne Barracks; 54.36947°N 1.62362°W	—	1935	An airfield watch tower and office with brick facing on a reinforced concrete frame and a roof in asphalt. It consists of a square building with a flat roof and a parapet, and a central tower rising through two further storeys with a parapet and railings, and containing an observation room. There is a small plinth and frieze bands, and the windows are steel casements.	II
Building 124, Marne Barracks; 54.37063°N 1.62533°W	—	1938	A sector operations block in reinforced concrete clad in red brick. It has a thick-section concrete roof on steel joists, and a thin-section upper roof with asphalt, and a space between them of 4 feet 6 inches (1.37 m) filled with sand and shingle. There are two angled entrances with concrete lining, and blocked casement windows. Inside, there are an operations room, a meteorological office, a battery room, a ventilating plant room, a searchlight room, a teleprinter room, a traffic office and a receiving room.	II
