= Kirkby Fleetham with Fencote =

Civil parish in North Yorkshire, England

Coordinates: 54.309320°N 1.335437°W

- Civil parish
- Population: 560 (2011 census)
- OS grid reference: SE288934
- Civil parish: Kirkby Fleetham with Fencote
- Unitary authority: North Yorkshire
- Ceremonial county: North Yorkshire
- Region: Yorkshire and the Humber
- Country: England
- Sovereign state: United Kingdom
- Post town: NORTHALLERTON
- Postcode district: DL7
- Police: North Yorkshire
- Fire: North Yorkshire
- Ambulance: Yorkshire

Kirkby Fleetham with Fencote is a civil parish in the county of North Yorkshire, England. At the 2011 census, the population was 560 which included the hamlets of Ainderby Mires and Holtby.

From 1974 to 2023 it was part of the Hambleton District, it is now administered by the unitary North Yorkshire Council.

== See also ==
- Listed buildings in Kirkby Fleetham with Fencote
