= Little Fencote =

Village in North Yorkshire, England

Coordinates: 54.332692°N 1.567842°W

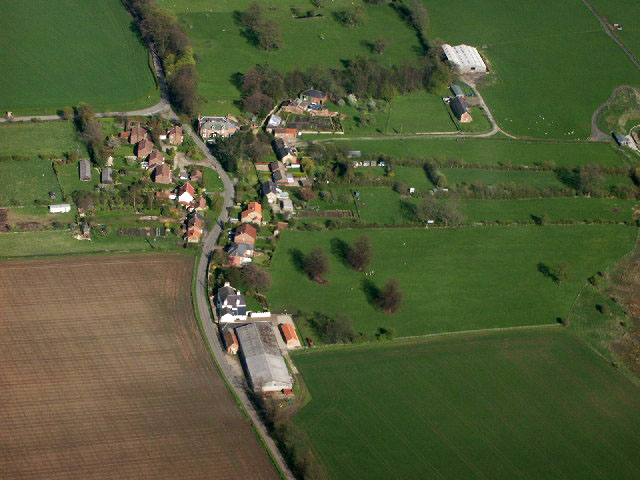

- Location within North Yorkshire
- OS grid reference: SE282931
- Unitary authority: North Yorkshire
- Ceremonial county: North Yorkshire
- Region: Yorkshire and the Humber
- Country: England
- Sovereign state: United Kingdom
- Post town: NORTHALLERTON
- Postcode district: DL7
- Police: North Yorkshire
- Fire: North Yorkshire
- Ambulance: Yorkshire

Little Fencote is a small village in the county of North Yorkshire, England. It is situated near Great Fencote and Kirkby Fleetham, about 1 mile (1.6 km) east of the A1(M) motorway.

From 1974 to 2023 it was part of the Hambleton District, it is now administered by the unitary North Yorkshire Council.
