= Whitwell, North Yorkshire =

Village and civil parish in North Yorkshire, England

Coordinates: 54.38778°N 1.56616°W

Whitwell
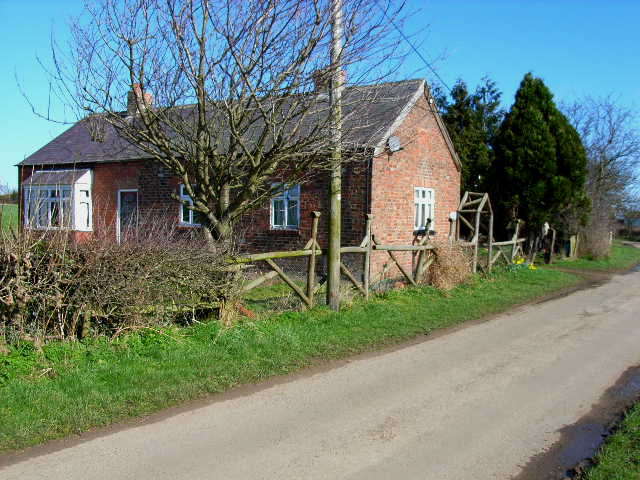
- Cottage at Whitwell

- Location within North Yorkshire
- Population: 50 (2015)
- OS grid reference: SE282992
- Unitary authority: North Yorkshire
- Ceremonial county: North Yorkshire
- Region: Yorkshire and the Humber
- Country: England
- Sovereign state: United Kingdom
- Post town: Richmond
- Postcode district: DL10
- Police: North Yorkshire
- Fire: North Yorkshire
- Ambulance: Yorkshire
- UK Parliament: Richmond and Northallerton

Whitwell is a village and civil parish in North Yorkshire, England. It is 6.5 miles (10.5 km) north west of the county town of Northallerton At the 2011 Census the population was less than 100. Details are included in the civil parish of Great Langton.

== History ==
The etymology of the name is derived from a combination of the Old English word hwit, meaning white or infertile and the Anglian suffix of wella, meaning spring or stream. Put together they mean White spring or stream. It has also been known as Nether Whitwell in the Whins.

The manor was a part of the estates of William the Conqueror and later his maternal half-sibling, Robert, Count of Mortain, but the lands were transferred by escheat to Walter Espec of Helmsley who founded Kirkham priory in 1122. The manor was part of the fee of the Constables whose manor was at Constable Burton and followed that descent. Around 1240 a mesne lordship was granted to Jollan de Nevill. Other landowners included the Staveley family who claimed land in 1272, though the major landowner were the Whitwell family. At the end of the 17th century, the manor was in the hands of John Belasyse of Worlaby, whose heirs owned a quarter share of the manor thereafter.

== Governance ==
The village lies within the Richmond and Northallerton UK Parliament constituency. From 1974 to 2023 it was part of the Hambleton District, it is now administered by the unitary North Yorkshire Council.

== Geography ==
Whitwell consists of little more than a few houses and a farm. The nearest notable settlements are Scorton and North Cowton.

=== Demography ===
Population
| Year | 1881 | 1891 | 1901 | 1911 | 1921 | 1931 | 1951 | 1961 | 2011 | 2015 |
|---|---|---|---|---|---|---|---|---|---|---|
| Total | 51 | 43 | 61 | 56 | 54 | 46 | 44 | 45 | 40 (Note: Estimated) | 50 (Note: Estimated) |
