= RAF Catterick =

Royal Air Force base in Yorkshire, England

RAF Catterick
- Catterick, North Yorkshire in England
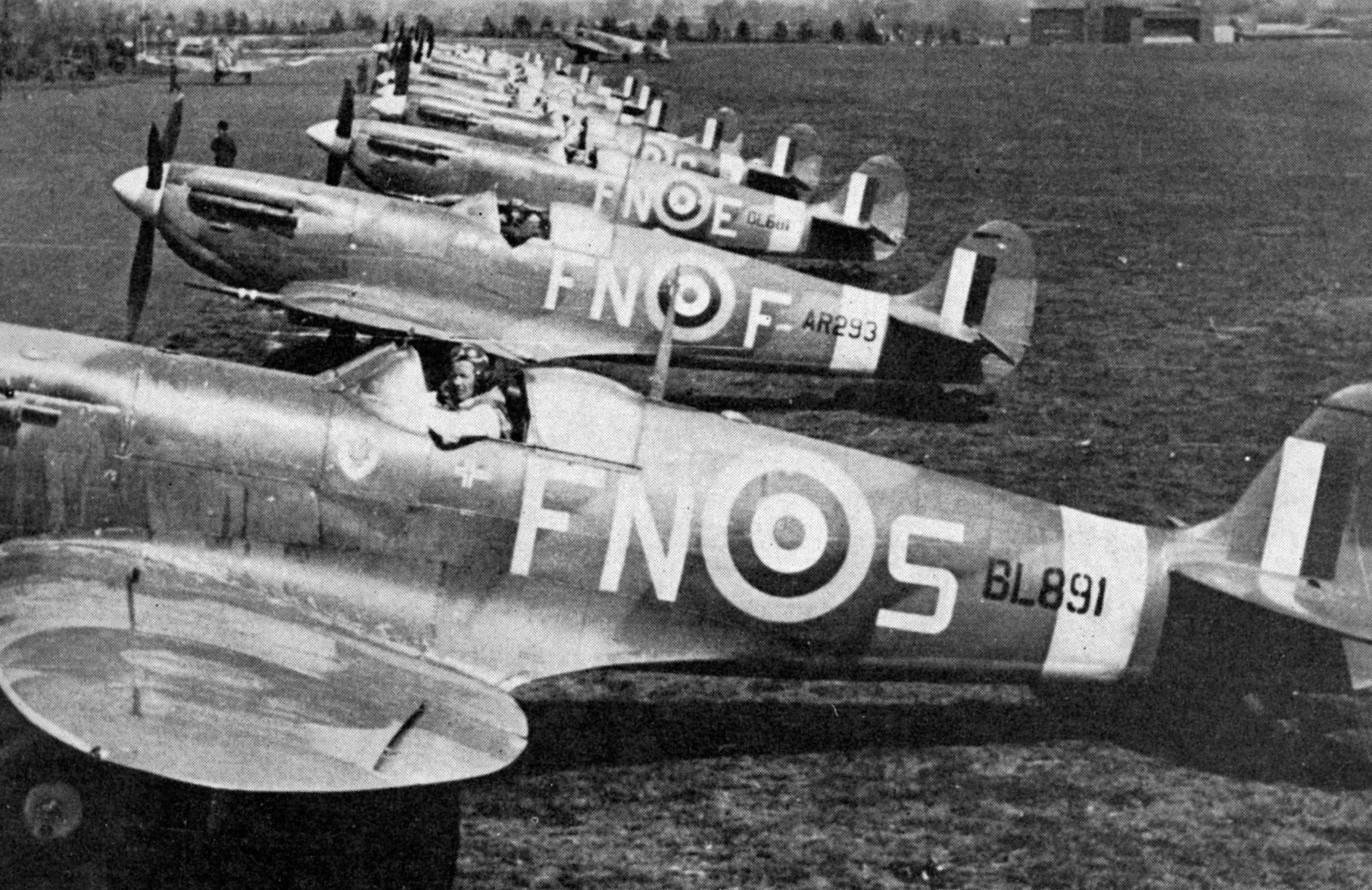
- Spitfires of 331 Squadron at RAF Catterick in spring 1942

- Vigilance and Knowledge

Site information
- Type: Royal Air Force sector station
- Code: AK
- Owner: Ministry of Defence
- Operator: Royal Flying Corps (1914–1918); British Army (1927–1939); Royal Air Force (1918–1927 and 1939–1994)
- Controlled by: RAF Fighter Command * No. 13 Group RAF * RAF Regiment
- Condition: Transferred to the British Army and became Marne Barracks.

Location
- Location in North Yorkshire RAF Catterick (the United Kingdom)
- Coordinates: 54°21′55″N 001°37′11″W

Site history
- Built: 1914
- Built by: John Laing & Son Ltd
- In use: 1914–1994
- Fate: Closed
- Battles/wars: European theatre of World War II; Cold War

Airfield information
- Elevation: 53 metres (174 ft) AMSL
Runways
Direction	Length and surface
10/28	1,020 metres (3,346 ft) Concrete

Royal Air Force Catterick or RAF Catterick is a former Royal Air Force sector station located near Catterick, North Yorkshire in England. It is located alongside the A6055 road on the outskirts of Catterick Village.

Although initially a flying station, RAF Catterick was primarily the depot of the RAF Regiment for nearly 50 years. The station closed in 1994 and was transferred to the British Army to become Marne Barracks. Operationally it falls under the command of Catterick Garrison. It currently houses 5th Regiment Royal Artillery and 32 Engineer Regiment.

== History ==
Catterick airfield or Catterick Airdrome/Aerodrome first opened in 1914 as a Royal Flying Corps aerodrome with the role of training pilots and to assist in the defence of the North East of England. It came under RAF administration in 1918 and housed No. 49 Training Depot Station.

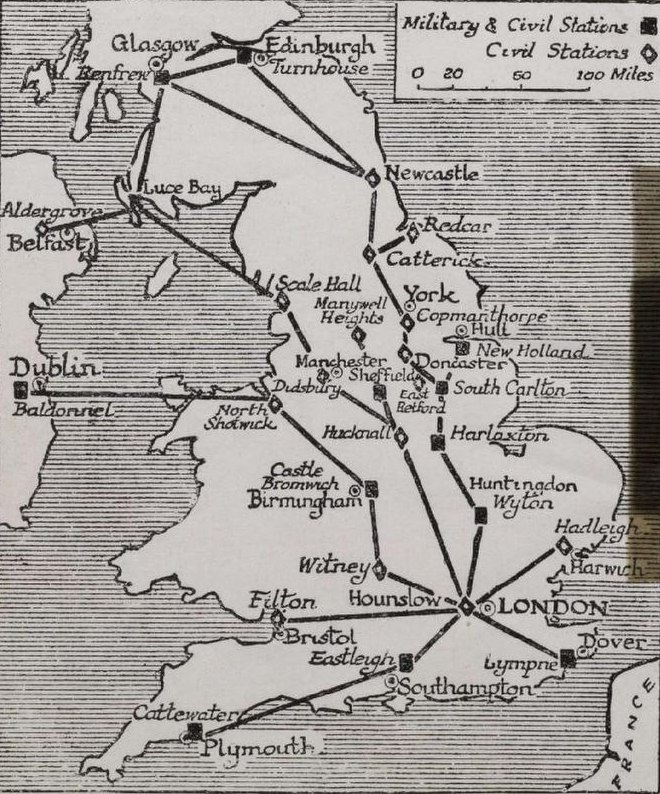
"Map of Air Routes and Landing Places in Great Britain, as temporarily arranged by the Air Ministry for civilian flying", published in 1919, showing Catterick as a "civil station"

In 1927, it temporarily came under the administration of the British Army, under RAF Army Cooperation Command which would supply the army with air support as required. This continued until 1939 when the station was handed back to the RAF.

During the Second World War, the airfield operated a small satellite station, RAF Scorton, near the village of Scorton.

Catterick's runway could not be extended from its existing 3,350 ft (1,020 m) for the Jet Age due to the perimeter being bounded by the A1 (or Great North Road) and the River Swale. Therefore, Catterick's role changed after the Second World War, becoming the depot of the RAF Regiment from 1946 until 1994.

=== Royal Air Force flying units (1914–1946) ===
The following squadrons have at some points been stationed at RAF Catterick:

1-99 Squadrons

- No. 17 Squadron RAF with the Hawker Hurricane IIB, No. 26 (South African) Squadron RAF, No. 41 Squadron RAF, No. 44 (Rhodesia) Squadron RAF, No. 53 Squadron RAF, No. 54 Squadron RAF, No. 63 Squadron RAF, No. 64 Squadron RAF, No. 68 Squadron RAF, No. 79 (Madras Presidency) Squadron RAF and No. 89 Squadron RAF.

100-199 Squadrons

- No. 107 Squadron RAF, No. 115 Squadron RAF, No. 118 Squadron RAF, No. 122 (Bombay) Squadron RAF, No. 127 Squadron RAF, No. 130 (Punjab) Squadron RAF, No. 131 (County of Kent) Squadron RAF, No. 134 Squadron RAF and No. 145 Squadron RAF.

200-299 Squadrons

- No. 219 (Mysore) Squadron RAF, No. 222 (Natal) Squadron RAF, No. 256 Squadron RAF and No. 289 Squadron RAF.

300-399 Squadrons

- No. 306 Polish Fighter Squadron, No. 313 (Czechoslovak) Squadron RAF, No. 331 (Norwegian) Squadron RAF and No. 332 (Norwegian) Squadron RAF.

400-499 Squadrons

- No. 401 Squadron RCAF and No. 403 Squadron RCAF.

500-599 Squadrons

- No. 504 (County of Nottingham) Squadron AAF.

600-699 Squadrons

- No. 600 (City of London) Squadron AAF and No. 609 (West Riding) Squadron AAF.

Other units

- No. 6 Reserve Aeroplane Squadron, No. 6 Reserve Squadron, No. 6 Training Squadron, No. 14 Reserve Aeroplane Squadron, No. 14 Reserve Squadron, No. 14 Training Squadron, No. 37 Reserve Squadron, No. 46 Training Squadron, No. 49 Training Depot Station, No. 52 Training Squadron, No. 68 Reserve Squadron, No. 69 Training Squadron, No. 83 (Canadian) Reserve Squadron, No. 88 (Canadian) Reserve Squadron,
- No. 3 Aircraft Delivery Flight RAF (October - November 1943)
- Detachment of No. 7 Anti-Aircraft Co-operation Unit RAF (May 1941)
- 8th Wing RFC
- No. 35 Maintenance Unit RAF (May 1947 - August 1949)
- 166th Aero Squadron
- No. 401 (Fleet Fighter) Flight
- No. 449 (Fleet Spotter Reconnaissance) Flight
- No. 450 (Fleet Spotter Reconnaissance) Flight
- No. 645 Gliding School RAF (March 1960 - 1984) became No. 645 Volunteer Gliding School RAF (1984 -
- No. 1472 (Anti-Aircraft Co-operation) Flight RAF (January - November 1943)
- Detachment of No. 1489 (Fighter) Gunnery Flight RAF (July 1943 - ?)
- Detachment of No. 1490 (Fighter) Gunnery Flight RAF (May - July 1943)
- Air Crew Allocation Centre
- RAF Film Unit (October 1944- ?)

=== Royal Air Force Regiment ===
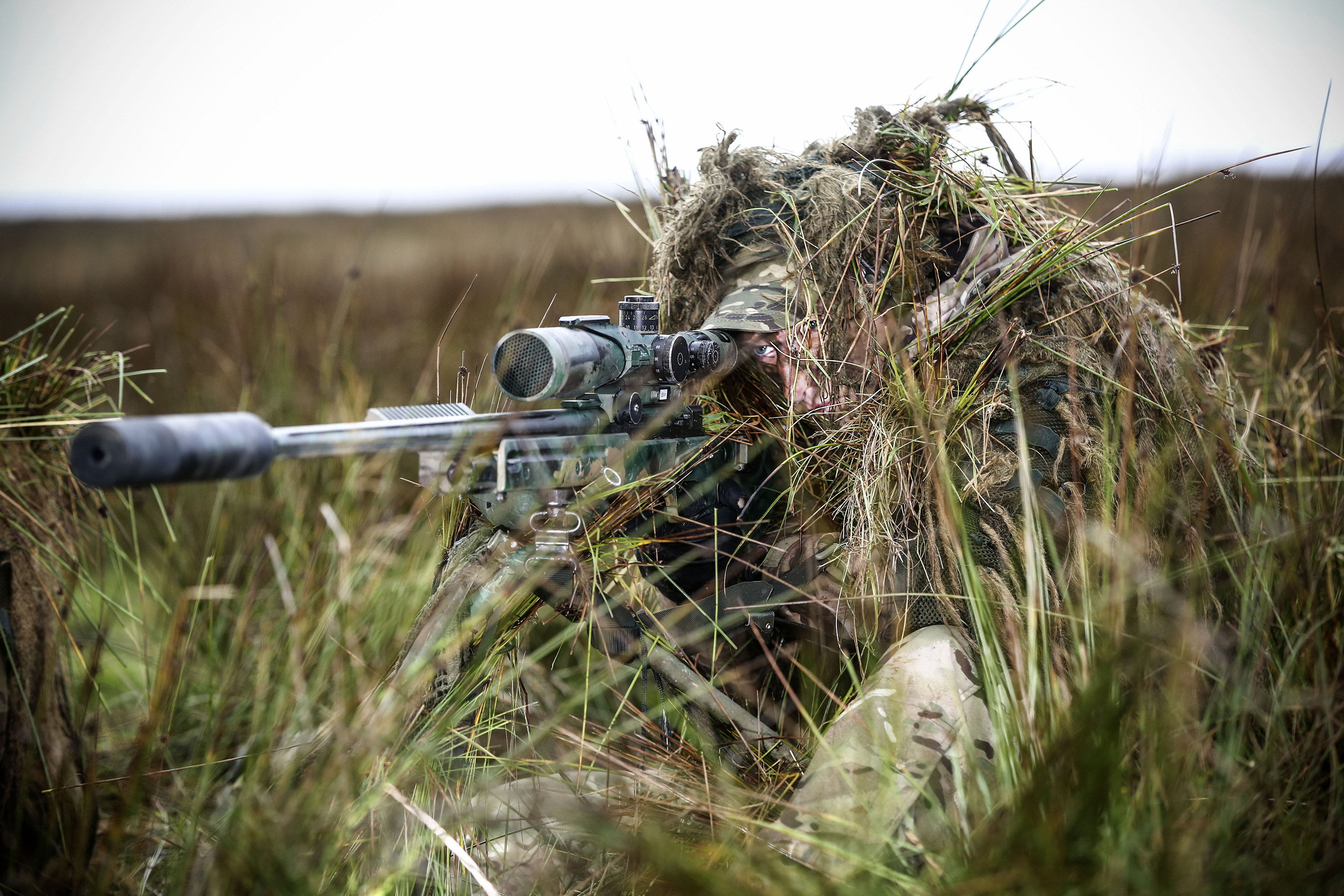
RAF Catterick was home to the RAF Regiment depot between 1946 and 1994

Catterick served as a regimental depot of the RAF Regiment occupied by operational Squadrons and was the training base for the RAF Regiment from 1946 to 1994 when the Regiment's training facilities moved to RAF Honington. Catterick was also the training centre for the RAF Fire Service as the RAF School of Fire Fighting until the 1990s. As a fire school it had a "rescue set" the mock up of a house to simulate search and rescue scenarios. It also had a burning area where ex service aircraft were covered in fuel and set alight including in 1983 two complete Avro Vulcan bombers. The Vulcans were only able to land after the closure of the A1 and the clearing of the fields on the opposite side of the road. The aircraft had to fly as low to the ground as possible well before crossing the perimeter of the airfield and touched down at the furthest possible extremity, in order to be able to stop safely before running out of runway. There were also a number of retired airframes used for practice rescues and deployments. The Fire Fighting & Rescue squadron moved to RAF Manston in 1989.

During the 1980s, Catterick was home to the largest UK-based fleet of armoured vehicles in the British forces. The fleet consisted of FV101 Scorpion Combat Reconnaissance Vehicles (CVRT) and FV103 Spartan Armoured Personnel Carriers (APC). As well as these infantry assets, the RAF Regiment at Catterick held the Rapier air defence training wing and, after the Falklands War, a number of 35mm twin-barrelled Oerlikon GDF anti-aircraft cannons captured from Argentinian forces. These particular guns were used to great effect in late 1982 to accompany a memorable rendition of the 1812 Overture at the station's official victory parade, on the return of troops from the South Atlantic.

The RAF Regiment was a welcome occupier of the site and was granted the Freedom of Richmond, North Yorkshire in 1971, as a gesture of gratitude and goodwill by the local people. Whilst no longer resident at Catterick, the Regiment holds this honour very dear and mark it each year with the Freedom of Richmond Parade in the town. 2022 saw 34 Squadron mark the 51st anniversary.

The following RAF Regiment units were here at some point:

- No. 2 Squadron RAF Regiment
- No. 16 Squadron RAF Regiment
- No. 37 Squadron RAF Regiment
- No. 48 Squadron RAF Regiment
- No. 51 Squadron RAF Regiment
- No. 58 Squadron RAF Regiment
- No. 2701 Squadron RAF Regiment
- No. 2703 Squadron RAF Regiment
- No. 2729 Squadron RAF Regiment
- No. 2736 Squadron RAF Regiment
- No. 2742 Squadron RAF Regiment
- No. 2757 Squadron RAF Regiment
- No. 2773 Squadron RAF Regiment
- No. 2777 Squadron RAF Regiment
- No. 2798 Squadron RAF Regiment
- No. 2800 Squadron RAF Regiment
- No. 2806 Squadron RAF Regiment
- No. 2809 Squadron RAF Regiment

== Marne Barracks ==
The RAF station closed on 30 June 1994 with the RAF Regiment depot moving to RAF Honington. The site was then transferred to the British Army to become Marne Barracks which is part of the Catterick Garrison complex. A number of establishments exist on the barracks, including a HUB bar, a Londis shop, a PRI shop, a hairdresser, and a gymnasium. The barracks have had upgraded accommodation installed as part of Project SLAM (Single Living Accommodation Modernisation). This has been undertaken by Corus. BAM Construction have also undertaken the conversion of some of the old RAF hangars to maintenance depots for the Land Rovers utilised by the two regiments.

== In popular culture ==
RAF Catterick was used as the fictional 'RAF Halfpenny Field' for the 1945 film The Way to the Stars, and some of the airfield locations remain little changed.

== Motorsport ==
Between 1958 and 1963, the airfield was partly used as a race track, under the name of Catterick Circuit.

== See also ==
- List of former Royal Air Force stations
- Listed buildings in Catterick, North Yorkshire
