= East Appleton =

Hamlet in North Yorkshire, England

Coordinates: 54.35759°N 1.6393°W

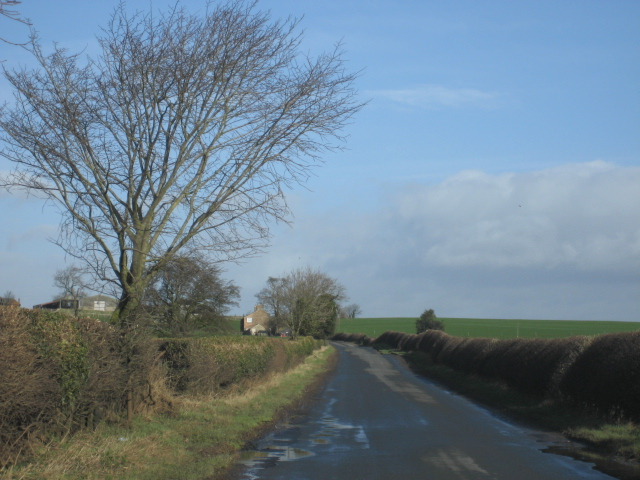
- Approaching East Appleton

- Location within North Yorkshire
- OS grid reference: SE235958
- Unitary authority: North Yorkshire
- Ceremonial county: North Yorkshire
- Region: Yorkshire and the Humber
- Country: England
- Sovereign state: United Kingdom
- Police: North Yorkshire
- Fire: North Yorkshire
- Ambulance: Yorkshire

East Appleton is a hamlet in North Yorkshire, England. The poet Richard Braithwaite lived there on his estate, and was buried in the parish church. Roger Strickland later inherited the estate from Braithwaite's widow.

== See also ==
- Listed buildings in Appleton East and West
